= Cartmel Peninsula =

Peninsula in Cumbria, England

Coordinates: 54°13′27″N 2°57′49″W

Cartmel Peninsula is a peninsula in Cumbria in England. It juts in a southerly direction into Morecambe Bay, bordered by the estuaries of the River Leven to the west and the River Winster to the east. It is, along with the Furness Peninsula, (from which it is separated by the River Leven) one of the two areas that formed Lancashire North of the Sands, and the better known 'Furness' is often used to describe both peninsulae together. To its north, the peninsula's borders are usually given as the banks of Windermere and the border with the historic county of Westmorland between the Lake and the head of the Winster.

Historically, the area was controlled by the monks of Cartmel Priory. Following its dissolution, much of the local land fell into the ownership of the Preston family at Holker Hall. Through marriage Holker became part of the estate of the Cavendish Family, and today is the home of Lord Cavendish. As well as the estate around Holker, the Cavendish family still owns much of the land of the Peninsula.

The Cartmel Peninsula is largely rural dominated by limestone outcrops and the overlooking Cumbrian mountains. There is some agriculture, with saltmarsh lamb raised on the sands of Morecambe Bay that surround the peninsula, but this is limited by the challenging landscape. The modern peninsula is a popular tourist destination, and together with Furness, Cartmel has been marketed as part of the Lake District Peninsulas, though the Lake District National Park only covers the northern portion of the peninsula. Cartmel's only town is Grange-over-Sands, a Victorian seaside resort. Grange's growth was a result of the Furness Railway, which runs along the peninsula's southern edge, with stations at Grange, Cark and Cartmel and Kents Bank.

Cartmel's name is known internationally as a 'foodie' destination. It is home to L'Enclume, a Michelin two-star restaurant named the best in the UK by the Good Food Guide between 2013 and 2017, and to Cartmel sticky toffee pudding, produced in the village shop and sold globally.

The following settlements and sites can be found on the peninsula:

- Allithwaite, Ayside
- Cartmel, Cartmel Priory, Cartmel Racecourse, Cark
- Flookburgh
- Grange-over-Sands
- High Newton, Holker Hall
- Lindale, Low Newton, Cumbria
- Newby Bridge
- Ravenstown
