= Kents Bank =

Village in Cumbria, England

Coordinates: 54.17282°N 2.92525°W

- Village
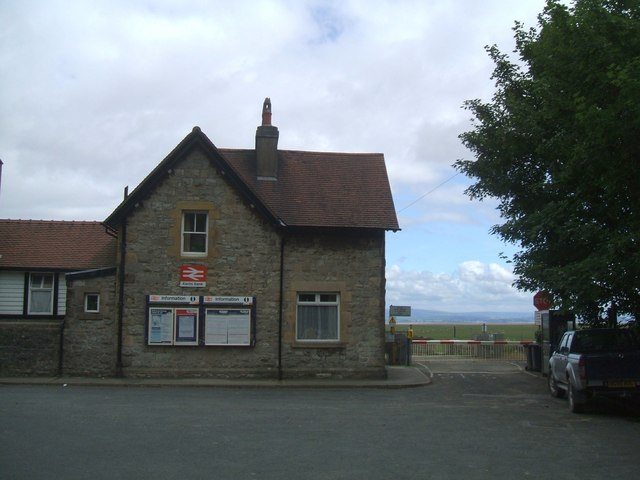
- Kents Bank railway station

- Location in the former South Lakeland district Location on Morecambe Bay Location within Cumbria
- Population: 1,623
- OS grid reference: SD3975
- Civil parish: Grange-over-Sands
- Unitary authority: Westmorland and Furness
- Ceremonial county: Cumbria
- Region: North West
- Country: England
- Sovereign state: United Kingdom
- Post town: GRANGE-OVER-SANDS
- Postcode district: LA11
- Dialling code: 015395
- Police: Cumbria
- Fire: Cumbria
- Ambulance: North West
- UK Parliament: Westmorland and Lonsdale

Kents Bank is a small village in Cumbria, England, so named for its proximity to the River Kent estuary. Part of the historic County Palatine of Lancashire, it is located 2 miles (3.2 km) south-west of Grange-over-Sands.

== History ==
Kents Bank takes its name from the River Kent which once ran close to the village. Kents Bank railway station opened in 1857. Abbot Hall and an inn existed close to the shore where the cross-sand route over Morecambe Bay from Lancaster met the land. Abbot Hall was the poor house for the area until 1822 and a building is reputed to have existed here since the 12th century. Expansion of the settlement started around 1870 and at least three private schools were established in the hamlet. Further expansion continued over the years.

The Kings's Guide to the Sands is based nearby at Guide's Farm.

== Governance ==
Kents Bank does not have its own parish council, it is part of Grange-over-Sands Town Council. For local government purposes, it is in the Grange Ward of Westmorland and Furness Council.

Kents Bank was originally part of the county of Lancashire but in 1974, as part of the Local Government Act 1972 it became part of the newly formed county of Cumbria.

Kents Bank is part of the Westmorland and Lonsdale parliamentary constituency, of which Tim Farron is the current MP representing the Liberal Democrats.

== Demographics ==
According to the 2001 census the population for the South Lakeland 013D (Lower Layer Super Output Area) was 1,263, the area is over 99% White British with only 16 people from an ethnic minority. The average age of people is over 60 with Kents Bank appealing to the elderly and retired.

== Crime ==
In 2009 there were 1.6 crimes per head for the Grange area in 2010 it was 1.2 with the most common crime being antisocial behaviour. In January and February 2011 there was one reported crime in each month both were antisocial behaviour. in December 2010 there were no reported crimes.

The local police force serving Kents Bank is Cumbria Constabulary.

== Geography ==
Kents Bank lies on Morecambe Bay. The River Kent used to run to the sea wall by the railway but since 1993 the Kent has moved out towards Arnside and the sands have become overgrown. From the shore at Kents Bank the village is built on a hill that forms part of Hampsfield Fell. Before Kents Bank was built there were forests covering the area, most of which has been cut down.

=== Boundaries ===
The boundaries are, to the east the Furness Line railway and Morecambe Bay, to the north is Carter Road, to the south is Kentsford Road and to the west is the B5277 (Allithwaite Road). Kents Bank and Grange-over-Sands were two separate settlements, however the two have begun to merge into one. Kents Bank is 76 hectares (187.8 acres) in area.

=== Climate ===
Climate data for Cumbria (1971–2000 averages)
Month	Jan	Feb	Mar	Apr	May	Jun	Jul	Aug	Sep	Oct	Nov	Dec	Year
Mean daily maximum °C (°F)	5.7 (42.3)	6.2 (43.2)	8.3 (46.9)	11.1 (52.0)	14.9 (58.8)	17.2 (63.0)	19.4 (66.9)	18.9 (66.0)	15.8 (60.4)	12.3 (54.1)	8.4 (47.1)	6.5 (43.7)	12.1 (53.8)
Mean daily minimum °C (°F)	0.4 (32.7)	0.7 (33.3)	2.0 (35.6)	3.0 (37.4)	5.4 (41.7)	8.4 (47.1)	10.5 (50.9)	10.1 (50.2)	8.2 (46.8)	5.7 (42.3)	2.7 (36.9)	1.1 (34.0)	4.9 (40.8)
Average rainfall mm (inches)	103.1 (4.06)	72.6 (2.86)	76.9 (3.03)	50.4 (1.98)	54.9 (2.16)	56.0 (2.20)	62.1 (2.44)	69.6 (2.74)	77.0 (3.03)	97.1 (3.82)	101.0 (3.98)	108.5 (4.27)	929.2 (36.58)
Source: Met Office Newton Rigg

== Economy ==
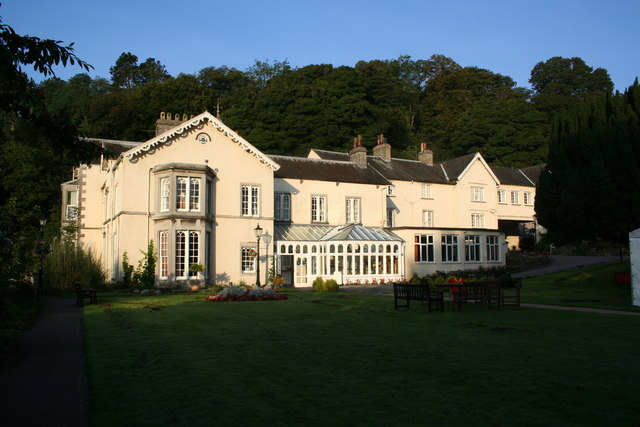
Abbot Hall in Kents Bank

Most people living in Kents Bank are retired, the main sector for employment is wholesale and retail followed by estate agency, renting and business activities. There is a large hotel in Kents Bank called Abbot Hall which opened in 1916 and is owned by the Christian Guild. The one shop which included a Post Office closed early 2016.

== Public services ==
The postcode is an LA one for the Lancaster area. The postal town is Grange-over-Sands. Water and sewage services are provided by United Utilities, the distribution network operator for the area is Electricity North West. The nearest library is in Grange-over-Sands.

Kents Bank is part of the Cumbria Constabulary area and the nearest police stations are Ulverston and Milnthorpe which are both around 13 miles (20.9 km) away. Kents Bank lies in the Cumbria Fire and Rescue Service and North West Ambulance Service area both of which have stations in Grange-over-Sands.

== Health ==
Kents Bank is part of the Cumbrian National Health Service area. The nearest surgery is in Grange-over-Sands and Westmorland General Hospital in Kendal is the area's local hospital. The nearest Accident and Emergency Department and out of hours GP services are also based at Westmorland General.

== Education ==
The nearest primary schools are Allithwaite Church and Grange-over-Sands. The nearest secondary school is Cartmel Priory School. The area's local college is Kendal College.

== Religion ==
Kents Bank lies in the Church of England parish of St Mary, Allithwaite. According to the 2001 census 82% of people described themselves as Christian and 18% did not state their religion or were non-religious and there were three persons belonging to other religions.

== Transport ==
Kents Bank has three bus stops and is served by routes 530, 531 and 532.

Kents Bank railway station is on the Furness Line from Barrow-in-Furness to Lancaster and is served by Northern services.

== Media ==
The local newspaper is the Westmorland Gazette. The BBC local radio station is BBC Radio Cumbria and independent radio includes Smooth Lake District and Heart North West

Kents Bank is part of the BBC North West and Granada ITV Regions, both broadcast from the Winter Hill transmitting station.

== Places of interest ==
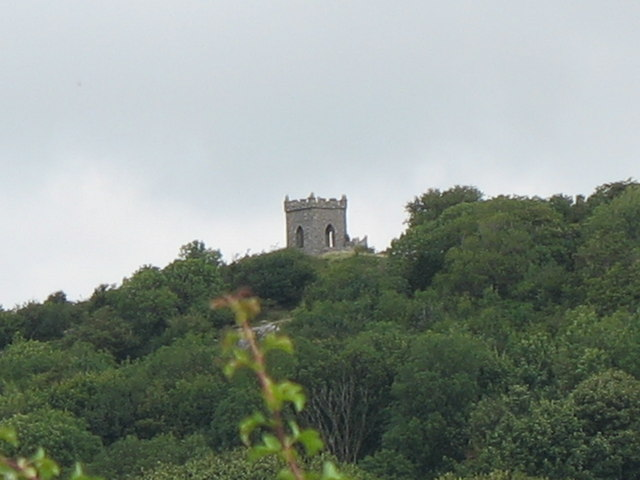
Kirkhead Tower seen from Kents Bamk

=== Kirkhead Tower ===
To the south of Kents Bank is Kirkhead Tower. Little is known about the tower other than it was built as a summer house in the Gothic style. It appears on a map published in 1826. It is said that the tower is on the site of an ancient church that dates from before the construction of Cartmel Priory. However this is a legend but it is said that it is how Kirkhead got its name. The tower is sometimes used for open air Sunday worship.

=== Humphrey Head ===
To the south of Kents Bank lies Humphrey Head which is a limestone outcrop that stretches out to Morecambe Bay.

== See also ==
- Listed buildings in Grange-over-Sands
