= Aynsome Manor =

Country house hotel in Cumbria, England

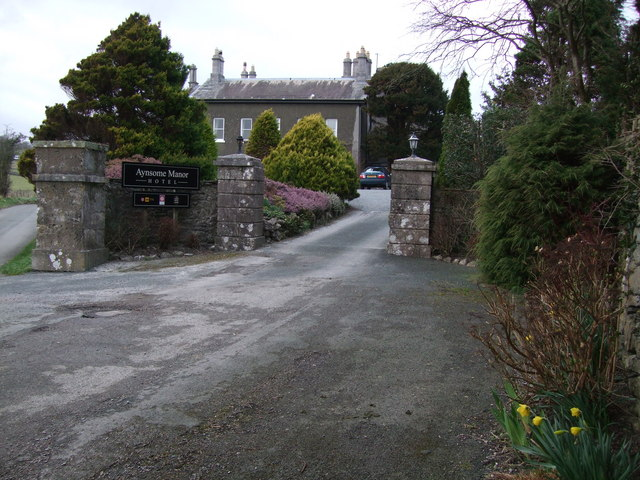
- Aynsome Manor

- Location within Cumbria

General information
- Location: Cartmel, Cumbria, England, UK
- Coordinates: 54°12′36″N 2°56′42″W
- Opening: 1735

Other information
- Number of rooms: 12
- Number of restaurants: 1

Aynsome Manor is a country house hotel in Cartmel, Cumbria, northwestern England, in the Lake District. It is set in the Vale of Cartmel, with views of a Norman priory, meadows and woods to the south.

== History and architecture ==
The author Samuel Taylor claimed that there is not ancient record to prove that Aynsome had ever been a formal manor, but notes that the surrounding area and River Ea was involved with grinding corn in medieval times. The hotel is in the Georgian style, in a building which was built in 1735, but was originally 17th century. For many years the house was in the possession of the descendants of William Marshall, the Earl of Pembroke. It later came under the ownership of the Varley family. In 1842, John Remington, vicar of Cartmel, built a fine dining room to entertain the Duke of Devonshire. Distinguishing features of the dining room include the panelling, bay windows and ornate moulded ceiling.

It has 12 bedrooms, two of which are situated in a cottage, which was converted from a 16th-century stone stable. The hotel was awarded the Cesar Award by The Good Hotel Guide in 1998.

== Restaurant ==
The restaurant has been awarded a rosette by AA who notes its "starters of guinea fowl and leek terrine wrapped in Cumbrian ham served with apricot and sultana chutney, and mussels steamed with garlic, parsley, cream and white wine" and main courses [which] might include "rich, gamey venison loin in damson and gin jus plated with a sage and onion-flavoured polenta cake". As of 2016 the chief chef is Gordon Topp.
