= Listed buildings in Allithwaite and Cartmel =

Allithwaite and Cartmel is a civil parish in Westmorland and Furness, Cumbria, England. It contains 98 listed buildings that are recorded in the National Heritage List for England. Of these, one is listed at Grade I, the highest of the three grades, three are at Grade II*, the middle grade, and the others are at Grade II, the lowest grade. The parish includes the villages of Cartmel, which contains most of the listed buildings in the parish, and Allithwaite, and the surrounding countryside. Most of the listed buildings are houses and associated structures, shops, public houses and hotels, farmhouses, and farm buildings. The other listed buildings include churches and items in the churchyard, crosses, a tower house, the gatehouse to a former priory, limekilns, bridges, guide stones, a lamppost, a school, a Quaker meeting house, a war memorial, and a village lock-up.

== Key ==
Grade	Criteria
I	Buildings of exceptional interest, sometimes considered to be internationally important
II*	Particularly important buildings of more than special interest
II	Buildings of national importance and special interest

== Buildings ==
Name and location	Photograph	Date	Notes	Grade
Cartmel Priory; 54.20118°N 2.95226°W		1190	Originally the church of a priory, and after the priory was suppressed it became a parish church. There have been alterations and additions during the centuries. The church is in stone with buttresses, embattled parapets, and slate roofs. It has a cruciform plan, consisting of a nave with a clerestory, north and south aisles, a south porch, north and south transepts with a large crossing, a chancel with a clerestory, a north aisle and a vestry, and a south chapel. Above the crossing is a tower, set diagonally. The church is largely Transitional in style, with heavy 15th century rebuilding in the Perpendicular Gothic style. The west window has five lights, and the east window has nine.	I
Cross at Headless Cross; 54.19746°N 2.95195°W		Medieval	The base is medieval and the rest of the cross dates from the 19th century. It is in stone, and consists of a square base, a plinth of three steps, and a cross with short arms.	II
Priory Gatehouse; 54.20104°N 2.95460°W		Early 14th century	The gatehouse has since been used for other purposes, including as a school and as an exhibition hall. It is built in stone with a slate roof, with a rectangular plan, four storeys, and a stair tower to the east. In the ground floor to the right is a vaulted arched passageway, with a bow window to the left. Above the window is a casement window with a mullioned window above that. Over the arch is a niche with a moulded surround. Inside the passageway are three doorways, one with an ogee head.	II*
Remains of cross 54.20061°N 2.95234°W	—	Early 15th century (probable)	The cross remains are in the churchyard of Cartmel Priory. The remains are in stone, and have an octagonal base of two steps, the lower chamfered, the upper moulded. On the steps are part of an ornamental octagonal cross shaft with sockets on the top.	II
Wraysholme Tower; 54.17084°N 2.94618°W		Late 15th century (probable)	Originally a pele tower, it was later reduced in height, a floor was removed, and it was converted into a bank barn. It is in stone, now with one storey, and has a gabled slate roof. On the north side is a corbelled parapet and corner turrets with corbelled embattled parapets, and on the south side is a projecting garderobe. There are various windows and inserted entrances. The tower is also a scheduled monument.	II*
Priory Close House; 54.20115°N 2.95294°W	—	Early 17th century	The house contains medieval material, and alterations were made in about 1710. It is in roughcast stone with slate roofs, two storeys, five bays, and a three-bay gabled wing at the rear. The windows vary, and include mullioned windows and a large stair window. above the entrance is a canopy on brackets.	II*
Well Knowe House and Farmhouse; 54.20501°N 2.96326°W	—	1650	Two houses in roughcast stone with a slate roof and two storeys. There is a front of four bays, the left bay being part of the farmhouse, the rest of it forming a three-bay gabled wing at the rear. On the front is a doorway with a canopy on brackets, and above the door is a lintel with two blind arches and the date. The windows on the front are sashes, and at the rear is a French window, casement windows, and a gabled porch.	II
Abbots Beck House; 54.20130°N 2.95313°W	—	17th century (probable)	The house probably has medieval foundations. It is in roughcast stone with a slate roof, and has two storeys with an attic. The south front has one bay, a mullioned window in the ground floor, a casement window above, and a doorway. On the north front is a lean-to extension. The west front has two bays and sash windows.	II
Church Town House; 54.20097°N 2.95441°W	—	17th century (probable)	The house was extended in the early 19th century with the addition of another storey. It is in roughcast stone with a slate roof, and has three storeys and three bays. The windows in the ground and top floors are sashes, and in the middle floor they are casements. Above the doorway is a flat canopy on brackets.	II
High Bank Side Farmhouse and outbuilding 54.19354°N 2.97112°W	—	Mid 17th century	The farmhouse is in roughcast stone with a slate roof. It has two storeys, three bays, and a rear gabled wing. The windows on the front are mullioned, some with hood moulds, and at the rear are casement windows. On the front is a central doorway, and in the rear wing steps lead up to a first floor doorway. There is a small outbuilding to the north.	II
Kirstead; 54.20023°N 2.94964°W	—	17th century (probable)	The house is roughcast with a slate roof that was raised in the 18th century. There are two storeys, two bays, and a rear gabled wing. In the ground floor are casement windows that have lights with segmental heads, and in the upper floor are sash windows.	II
Priory Close Cottage and outbuildings 54.20130°N 2.95282°W	—	17th century	The house and outbuildings are in stone, possibly on medieval foundations, with a slate roof and two storeys. The house is roughcast and has three bays. The windows are a mix of sashes and casements, and on the front is a flat-roofed porch. To the left is a two-bay cow house, and beyond that is a barn with an outshut.	II
Priory Guesthouse, shop and cobbled paving 54.20080°N 2.95471°W		17th century (probable)	The building is in stone with a slate roof, two storeys, and a rear wing, giving an L-shaped plan. The first bay is gabled, and the upper floor is jettied on a Doric column and half-column. In the ground floor is a bay window with a frieze and a cornice. Most of the windows are sashes, there is one casement window, and in the rear wing is a mullioned window. In front of the building is patterned cobbled paving.	II
The Larch Tree and Hales; 54.20098°N 2.95307°W	—	17th century (probable)	A pair of shops with living accommodation above in roughcast stone with a slate roof. There are three storeys, The Larch Tree has three bays, Hales has two, and at the left is a projecting gabled wing with limestone quoins. In the ground floor are shop fronts and doorways, in the upper floors are sash windows, and at the rear of The Larch Tree are mullioned windows.	II
Parkside House and barn 54.20126°N 2.95529°W		1658	The house and barn are in stone with a slate roof. The house is roughcast and has two storeys, three bays, and two gabled wings at the rear. Above the doorway is a datestone with initials. In the ground floor is a seven-light mullioned window, and the other windows are sashes. The barn has windows and double doors on the front, ventilation slits in the right return, and an outshut and a gabled wing at the rear.	II
Surgery; 54.20143°N 2.95443°W	—	1667	A roughcast stone house with a slate roof, two storeys, four bays, and outshuts at the rear. Most of the windows are casements.	II
21 Cavendish Street; 54.20168°N 2.95425°W	—	Late 17th century	A house in roughcast stone with a slate roof. it has two storeys, four bays, the right two bays recessed, and a rear wing. Most of the windows are sashes, with a plate glass window in the second bay. In the first bay is a doorway with a fanlight, and the third bay has a timber porch with chamfered posts, an entablature and a parapet; the doorway has a chamfered stone surround and a decorated lintel.	II
Bluebell House; 54.20083°N 2.95330°W	—	Late 17th century (probable)	A roughcast house with a slate roof, two storeys and three bays. At the rear is a gabled wing and a two bay extension. The windows on the front are sashes, and at the rear are casement windows and ventilation slits.	II
Market Cross Cottage and Gatehouse (West bay); 54.20106°N 2.95476°W	—	Late 17th century (probable)	A house to which the top floor was added in the 19th century. It is in roughcast stone with a top frieze, bracketed eaves, a moulded gutter, and a slate roof. There are three storeys, and four bays. In the fourth bay is a doorway with a flat canopy on brackets with a bow window to the left, in the middle floor is a casement window, and the top floor contains a sash window. The other three bays have a central doorway with an architrave and a modillioned cornice, and the windows are sashes. All the windows in the top floor cut into the frieze.	II
Barn Hey Cottage; 54.17798°N 2.94647°W	—	1700	A roughcast house with a slate roof, two storeys, two bays, and casement windows on the front. Above the door is a decorative lintel, including the date. There are doors and sash windows in the right return and at the rear. Inside the house are timber framed partitions.	II
Beckside Cottage and barn 54.21654°N 2.96329°W	—	Late 17th or 18th century (probable)	A house and barn in roughcast stone with slate roofs, two storeys and seven bays. The first four bays are higher and form the barn, the right two bays having been incorporated into the house. There is a lean-to outbuilding to the left, and a rear gabled wing. The ground floor windows are sashes, and in the upper floor they are casements. The first bay contains garage doors, in the second bay is a segmental-headed barn entrance, there is a door in the fourth bay, and another door in the sixth bay with a gabled porch, and in the rear wing is a dormer.	II
Devonshire House; 54.20081°N 2.95316°W	—	Late 17th or 18th century (probable)	A roughcast house with a top frieze, a narrow cornice, and a slate roof. There are three storeys, two bays, and a large gabled wing at the rear. The windows on the front are sashes, and in the rear wing is a mullioned window with a slate lintel.	II
Harrisons Farmhouse and barn 54.21461°N 2.95357°W	—	Late 17th or 18th century	The farmhouse and barn are in roughcast stone with slate roofs. The house has two storeys and three bays. On the front is a gabled porch, and most of the windows are casements. In the upper floor of the right bay is a French window with a gabled head. The barn to the left has doorways, one with a canopy.	II
Old Barn Cottage and cobbled paving 54.20087°N 2.95485°W		Late 17th or early 18th century (probable)	A stone house with roughcast lintel bands and a slate roof. There are two storeys, four bays, a canted corner, and a rear wing. The windows on the front are sashes, and in the rear wing are a casement window and a horizontally-sliding sash window. In front of the house is a narrow band of patterned cobble paving.	II
Park Beck Cottage; 54.20105°N 2.95521°W	—	17th or early 18th century (probable)	A roughcast stone house with a moulded gutter, a slate roof, two storeys, and one bay. In the ground floor is a recessed entrance, a fixed window, and a doorway with a flat canopy on brackets. In the upper floor is a sash window.	II
Park House; 54.20115°N 2.95513°W	—	17th or early 18th century (probable)	A roughcast stone house with a slate roof and two storeys. There are four bays, the fourth bay projecting forward, and at the rear is a gabled wing and a single-storey extension. Above the doorway is a flat canopy on brackets. The windows are sashes with segmental heads, and in the fourth bay are garage doors.	II
Priest Bridge; 54.18667°N 2.96985°W		17th or 18th century (probable)	The bridge carries a road over the River Eea. It is in stone and consists of a single segmental arch with voussoirs. The coped parapets date from the 20th century; the southwest parapet is corbelled out to the left and recessed to the right in order to straighten the road.	II
Thimble Hill; 54.20166°N 2.95500°W	—	Late 17th or early 18th century (probable)	A roughcast house with a slate roof, two storeys, three bays, and a rear outshut. In the centre is a doorway with Tuscan columns, a frieze and a pediment. Most of the windows are sashes.	II
Barn Hey Farmhouse; 54.17812°N 2.94642°W	—	1704	A roughcast farmhouse with a slate roof, it has two storeys, three bays, and a large rear gabled wing. The windows on the front are sashes. On the front is a gabled porch with a shaped lintel and a ball finial. At the rear is another gabled porch and casement windows.	II
Bank Court, Town Close and cobbled paving 54.20075°N 2.95454°W	—	Early 18th century	A pair of buildings in roughcast stone with slate roofs and two storeys. Bank Court has one bay. In the ground floor is a recessed bow window with an entry to the left containing the entrance. In the upper floor is a four-light casement window. At the rear are sash windows with segmental heads, and steps leading up to a doorway with a canopy on brackets. Town Close to the left has three bays, a doorway with a bracketed canopy, and sash windows, those in the ground floor with segmental heads. In front is decorative cobbled paving.	II
Gatehouse Cottage; 54.20112°N 2.95447°W	—	Early 18th century (probable)	A stone house with a slate roof, two storeys and two bays. There is a central doorway, and the windows are sashes.	II
Old Barn Garth and Barn Garth Cottage; 54.20034°N 2.95026°W	—	Early 18th century (probable)	A pair of roughcast houses with a slate roof, two storeys with attics, and four bays. The windows are casements, and the door in the fourth bay has a lean-to canopy. In the left return are small attic windows, and built into the wall by an upper floor window is a medieval shaft capital.	II
Village Institute; 54.20077°N 2.95304°W		Early 18th century	A public building incorporating shop units, it is in roughcast stone with ashlar dressings, quoins, bands, a cornice, and a slate roof with hipped dormers. There are two storeys with attics, and a symmetrical front of five bays. The windows are round-headed with imposts and keystones, and contain sashes. The central doorway has an architrave, panelled pilasters, a fanlight, and a segmental pediment on consoles.	II
Wharton House; 54.20107°N 2.95496°W	—	Early 18th century (probable)	A roughcast house with a top frieze, a modillioned cornice and a slate roof. There are two storeys with an attic, and three bays. The ground floor windows are sashes, in the upper floor they are top-hung casements, and in the gable end are two small attic windows.	II
Hill Farmhouse; 54.20499°N 2.97168°W	—	Early to mid 18th century	A roughcast house with a slate roof containing a flat-topped dormer. There are two storeys, four bays, and a rear gabled wing with a single-storey extension. Above the doorway is a flat canopy on brackets, and the windows are casements, with a stair window at the rear.	II
Royal Oak Public House; 54.20073°N 2.95425°W	—	Early to mid 18th century	The public house is in roughcast stone with slate roofs. There are two storeys, five bays, and a later rear wing and extensions. The windows are sashes, and the central doorway has pilasters, a frieze and a flat canopy.	II
Beckside House Farmhouse; 54.21652°N 2.96121°W	—	18th century	A roughcast stone house with two storeys, three bays, and a rear outshut. The central doorway has a timber porch, the windows at the front are sashes, and in the rear outshut there are casement windows.	II
Bluebell Cottage, Bridge Stores and Bridge House; 54.20085°N 2.95348°W	—	18th century (probable)	A row of two houses and a shop, in roughcast stone with a slate roof. There are two storeys and three bays. The first bay forms Bluebell Cottage, which has casement windows, a lean-to porch, and a gabled rear wing with limestone dressings and an inscribed millstone. In the rest of the building is a shop front with panelled pilasters and a fascia, a doorway, and sash windows.	II
Cavendish Arms Public House and outbuilding 54.20138°N 2.95419°W		18th century (probable)	The public house is in roughcast stone with slate roofs. There are two storeys and five bays, the right two bays being higher and projecting forward. The left three bays have a frieze and bracketed eaves, sash windows, and a segmental-headed doorway with panelled pilasters, a cornice on brackets, and a fanlight. In the right two bays is a large entrance with a loading door above, and mixed windows. To the left of the public house are two outbuildings, and in front of it is a double-sided mounting block with a date.	II
Cross, fish stone and pump 54.20097°N 2.95474°W		18th century	In The Square is the cross which consists of a stone obelisk on the site of a medieval cross. It has a plinth, and stands on three square steps. To the east, the fish stone consists of two slabs carried on two uprights, and to the east of this is a water pump with a wooden casing and a stone trough.	II
Ford House; 54.20072°N 2.95407°W	—	18th century (probable)	A roughcast stone house with a slate roof, three storeys and three bays. The windows in the lower two floors are sashes, and in the top floor they are casements.	II
Gazebo; 54.20179°N 2.95329°W	—	18th century	The gazebo is a square stone structure on the river bank, and has a pyramidal slate roof with a ball finial. There is one storey and a basement. The windows are casements, and steps on the east side lead up to a doorway.	II
Greenbank and outbuilding 54.21475°N 2.95239°W	—	18th century (probable)	A roughcast house that has a slate roof with coped gables. It has two storeys, a basement to the south, two bays, and a single-storey outbuilding to the left. Some windows are sashes, others are fixed. On the front is a gabled porch containing slate shelves. At the rear are external steps leading up to a doorway with a slate canopy.	II
Greencroft; 54.20150°N 2.95039°W	—	18th century (probable)	A roughcast stone house with moulded gutters and a slate roof. It has two storeys, a symmetrical front of three bays, a rear wing with an outshut, and a lower two-storey three-bay range to the left. The windows are sashes, and the entrance to the main block has Tuscan columns, a frieze and a pediment. In the left range, one of the windows has moulded medieval stones in the lintel.	II
Hard Cragg House; 54.20914°N 2.96340°W	—	Mid 18th century (probable)	A roughcast stone house with quoins and a slate roof, it has two storeys and seven bays, the right two bays being recessed and lower. The doorway in the sixth bay has a flat canopy. Most of the windows are sashes, there is a bay window, and the fourth and fifth bays have a hipped roof. At the rear is a gabled wing.	II
Howbarrow Farmhouse; 54.20297°N 2.98078°W	—	18th century	A roughcast farmhouse with a slate roof. It has two storeys, three bays, a single storey range to the left, and a rear gabled wing. Above the doorway is a flat canopy. Most of the windows are sashes, there is a three-light mullioned window in the first bay, and blocked segmental-headed windows in the third bay.	II
King's Arms Public House; 54.20085°N 2.95388°W		18th century	The public house is in roughcast stone with a slate roof. There are two storeys, three bays, two gabled wings at the rear, and a lean-to extension, partly extending over the River Eea, and supported on posts. On the front is a doorway with a flat canopy, and most of the windows are sashes. In front of the public house is a double-sided mounting block.	II
Kingsleys of Cartmel; 54.20075°N 2.95438°W	—	18th century (probable)	A shop with living accommodation in roughcast stone, with a top frieze, a cornice, and a slate roof. There are two storeys and three bays. In the ground floor is a shop front and a passageway to the left, and in the upper floor are top-hung casement windows.	II
Lane Head Farmhouse; 54.21784°N 2.96678°W	—	Mid 18th century (probable)	The farmhouse is in roughcast stone with a slate roof. It has two storeys, four bays, a lean-to outshut at the right, and a rear gabled wing. The doorway has a flat canopy on brackets, and the windows are sashes, with a French window in the first bay.	II
Middle Birkby Farmhouse and outbuilding 54.18870°N 2.95965°W	—	18th century (probable)	The farmhouse and outbuilding are in stone with slate roofs. The house is rendered, and the left return is tile-hung. There are two storeys, four bays, the right bay being lower, and a rear outshut. Some windows are sashes, others are casements, and one is mullioned. Above the doorway is a gabled canopy. The outbuilding is attached to the right bay, with a long single-storey wing at right angles extending to the road.	II
Post Office; 54.20099°N 2.95500°W		18th century	A house and shop in roughcast stone with a slate roof, two storeys and three irregular bays. In the ground floor are a doorway, a fixed window, a bow window and a sash window, and in the upper floor are casement windows. The left return, facing The Square, contains a bow window and a sash window above, and at the rear are five irregular bays with varied windows.	II
Priory House; 54.20151°N 2.95243°W	—	18th century	A roughcast house with an eaves band, a high coped parapet, and a slate roof. There are two storeys, a symmetrical front of five bays, and a lean-to outshut at the rear. In the centre is a doorway with Doric half-columns, entablature blocks and a pediment. The windows are sashes, and in the angle at the rear is an oriel window.	II
Tower View and Corner Cottage; 54.20172°N 2.95411°W	—	18th century (probable)	A pair of roughcast stone houses with a slate roof, two storeys and three bays. The windows are sashes, and above the doors are flat canopies on brackets.	II
Fletcher Memorial; 54.20096°N 2.95209°W	—	1752	The memorial to members of the Fletcher family is in the churchyard of Cartmel Priory. It is in stone, and consists of a chest tomb with incised rectangles on the sides and ovals on the ends.	II
5 Park View; 54.20166°N 2.95503°W	—	Mid to late 18th century	A roughcast stone house with a slate roof, two storeys and three bays. The windows are sashes, and the central doorway has flat pilasters, a frieze, a wide cornice, and a fanlight.	II
Hazeldene; 54.20134°N 2.95042°W	—	Mid to late 18th century (probable)	A roughcast house with quoins, a slate roof, two storeys and a symmetrical front of two bays. The central entrance has a flat canopy on brackets, and the windows are sashes. In the left return is a garage entrance.	II
Former Natwest bank 54.20076°N 2.95453°W	—	Mid to late 18th century	The former bank and bank house are in roughcast stone with a top frieze, a modillioned cornice, and a slate roof. There are two storeys and four bays, with a wide entry in the fourth bay. The windows are sashes, and the doorway has pilasters, an entablature and a pediment. In front is cobbled paving.	II
Yew Tree Cottage; 54.20124°N 2.95040°W	—	Mid to late 18th century	A roughcast stone house with a slate roof, two storeys and three bays. The central entrance has a chamfered surround and a flat canopy on brackets, and the windows are sashes.	II
Anvil Cottage, outbuilding, and The Old Smithy; 54.20180°N 2.95382°W		Late 18th century (probable)	The buildings are at right angles on a corner; they are in stone with slate roofs, two storeys, and sash windows. Anvil Cottage, facing north, has two bays, a projecting outbuilding to the left, and a doorway with an architrave. The Old Smithy faces west, it has three bays, the right bay is recessed with a single-storey gabled projection.	II
Beckside Farmhouse; 54.21613°N 2.96156°W	—	Late 18th century	Parts of the farmhouse may be from an earlier date. It is in roughcast stone with a slate roof. There are two storeys, three bays, and a lean-to outshut on the left. The doorway has a flat canopy on brackets, and the windows are sashes.	II
Cavendish Cottage; 54.20118°N 2.95443°W	—	Late 18th century (probable)	A roughcast house with a slate roof, three storeys and one bay. The windows in the lower two floors and at the rear are sashes, and in the top floor they are fixed with opening lights.	II
Fryers, Thompson and Turner Monuments; 54.20093°N 2.95201°W	—	Late 18th century	The memorials to members of the Fryers, Thompson and Turner families are in the churchyard of Cartmel Priory. They consist of a group of three chest tombs. The Fryer tomb has balusters in the corners, incised lozenges, a chamfered edge, and a round design in relief. The Thompson tomb has a simple base, fluted pilasters and incised ovals. The Turner tomb has a simple base, fluted pilaster strips, rectangular panels, and a chamfered edge.	II
Goad and Hall Memorials; 54.20095°N 2.95211°W	—	Late 18th century	The memorials are in the churchyard of Cartmel Priory and are in stone. The Goad tomb is a chest tomb with balusters in the corners and centres. The other tomb is a gravestone consisting of a vertical slab with a shaped top to the memory of Richard Hall, who died in 1789, and David Bayliff, who died in 1836.	II
Grayson Memorials; 54.20094°N 2.95212°W	—	Late 18th century	The monuments to members of the Grayson family are in the churchyard of Cartmel Priory. They are in ashlar stone and consist of two chest tombs. Both tombs have balusters, tops with rounded edges, and are carved with skull and cross bones and with hourglasses.	II
Jackson Monument; 54.20091°N 2.95232°W	—	Late 18th century	The monument to members of the Jackson family is in the churchyard of Cartmel Priory. It is in ashlar stone and consists of a plain chest.	II
Muchall Memorial; 54.20108°N 2.95236°W	—	Late 18th century	The memorial to John Muchall, who died in 1781, and others is in the churchyard of Cartmel Priory. The gravestone consists of a vertical slab with a raised centre on the top.	II
Newby Memorial; 54.20108°N 2.95248°W	—	Late 18th century	The monument to members of the Newby family is in the churchyard of Cartmel Priory. It is in ashlar stone, and consists of a chest tomb with lozenges on the sides and a top with rounded edges.	II
Priory Hotel; 54.20097°N 2.95417°W		Late 18th century (probable)	Two bays and an attic were added to the hotel in the 19th century. It is in roughcast stone with a top frieze, bracketed eaves, and a slate roof with gabled dormers. There are two storeys and five bays, the right two bays being later. Apart from one casement window in the attic, all the windows are sashes. In the second bay is a doorway with half-columns, a frieze and a cornice, and the fourth bay contains a shop front with a doorway to the right.	II
Tower Cottage; 54.20119°N 2.95460°W	—	Late 18th century (probable)	A house in roughcast stone with a slate roof, two storeys and four bays. Most of the windows are sashes. In the ground floor, the first bay has a bow window with a modillioned entablature and a cornice extending as a canopy over a doorway with a fanlight. In the second bay is a garage entrance, the third bay has a doorway, and in the fourth bay is a doorway with an entablature on consoles, and a segmental pediment with a moulded shell in the tympanum.	II
Taylor Monument; 54.20095°N 2.95232°W	—	1786	The monument to Rev. William Taylor is in the churchyard of Cartmel Priory. The gravestone consists of a vertical ashlar slab with a curved top, and contains an inscription including a verse.	II
Dixon Monument; 54.20098°N 2.95202°W	—	1788	The monument to Rowland Dixon is in the churchyard of Cartmel Priory. The gravestone consists of a vertical ashlar slab concave on the upper angles.	II
Maychell Monument; 54.20097°N 2.95219°W	—	1791	The memorial to James Maychell is in the churchyard of Cartmel Priory. It is a table tomb in ashlar stone, and consists of a slab with chamfered edges and four balusters.	II
The Grammar Hotel; 54.20541°N 2.95536°W	—	1790s	Originally a school, later used as a hotel, it was extended in 1862, and later. The building is in stone, the 1862 extension is in slate with limestone dressings, and it has hipped slate roofs. There are two storeys, the original part has four bays, with a two-bay extension to the left, the second bay projecting and gabled. The original part has rusticated quoins, and a string course. The windows are sashes, in the ground floor they are round headed, in the upper floor they have segmental heads, and the doorway is round-headed. In the second bay is a bay window and a datestone in the gable. In the left return is a timber porch, on the right return is a single-storey extension, and at the rear is a two-storey three-bay range.	II
Fairfield; 54.20270°N 2.95385°W	—	c. 1800	A house incorporating earlier material that was altered later. It is in roughcast stone, and has a slate roof with overhanging eaves. There are two storeys with attics, a symmetrical three-bay front, and a lower rear wing, giving an L-shaped plan. The windows are sashes, and the central doorway has Tuscan columns and a flat lintel with a cornice above.	II
Bee boles, Orchard Rise; 54.20371°N 2.97168°W	—	Late 18th or early 19th century (probable)	The bee boles are in stone, and consists of four recesses in the garden wall to the east of the house.	II
Field Beck; 54.20107°N 2.95062°W	—	Late 18th or early 19th century	A roughcast stone house with a slate roof, two storeys with an attic, and three bays. The central doorway has a flat canopy on brackets. The windows are sashes, those in the ground floor with segmental heads. In the attic is a flat-topped dormer with a horizontally-sliding sash window.	II
Garth House; 54.20046°N 2.95054°W	—	Late 18th or early 19th century	A roughcast house with a slate roof, two storeys and three bays. The windows are sashes, and the doorway has Tuscan columns, a frieze and a pediment. Flanking the house are walls containing round-arched entrances, and at the rear are an inserted casement window and a dormer.	II
Limekiln near Kirkhead Summer House; 54.17427°N 2.93349°W	—	18th or early 19th century	The limekiln is in stone and consists of a square structure built into a hillside. It has a round-arched fire hole with a keystone, and to the west is a brick inner hearth. The charge hole is blocked.	II
Limekiln near Middle Birkby Farmhouse; 54.18791°N 2.95692°W	—	18th or early 19th century	The limekiln is in stone. On the west side is a segmental-headed entrance to the fire hole, and there are the remains of projecting walls and splayed side walls.	II
Orchard Rise; 54.20361°N 2.97187°W	—	Late 18th or early 19th century	A roughcast stone house with a modillioned cornice and a slate roof. There are two storeys, three bays, a single-storey gabled rear wing, and a rear range. The round-headed doorway has half-columns, a fanlight, and an entablature with a pulvinated frieze, and angle blocks with rosettes. The windows are sashes.	II
Allithwaite Lodge; 54.17778°N 2.94573°W	—	Early 19th century	A roughcast house with ashlar dressings, quoins, a sill band, a top frieze, a bracketed cornice, and a hipped slate roof with tiled ridges. There are two storeys and three bays. On the front is a porch with steps, Doric columns, a frieze with a re-set datestone, a cornice, and a coped parapet. The windows are sashes. On the right return is a flat-roofed projection and a stair window, and at the rear is a canted bay window with a hipped roof.	II
Limekiln near Wike Farm; 54.16669°N 2.93776°W	—	Early 19th century (probable)	The limekiln is in stone. On the west side is a fire hole with a segmental arch, and there is a narrow projecting course above.	II
Church Bridge; 54.20092°N 2.95368°W		1829	The bridge carries a road over River Eea. It is in stone, and consists of a single segmental arch with voussoirs, a keystone, and a band. The date is on the south side of the south parapet, and there is an inscription on the south side of the north parapet.	II
Guide stone near Headless Cross; 54.19726°N 2.95193°W	—	1836	The guide stone consists of a rectangular stone slab set into a stone wall. It is inscribed with the date and with the distances in miles to Lancaster and to Allithwaite.	II
Guide stone near St Mary's Lodge; 54.19993°N 2.95230°W		c.1836	The guide stone consists of an approximately square stone slab set into a stone wall. It is inscribed with the distances in miles to Lancaster and to Ulverston. Below this are inscriptions reading "GRANGE" and "CARK" and pointing hands.	II
Guide stone near junction with Templands Road; 54.19731°N 2.95203°W	—	c.1836	The guide stone consists of a rectangular stone slab set into a stone wall. It is inscribed with the distance in miles to Ulverston, and below with "CARK", "HOLKER", and "FLOOKBURGH".	II
Kirkhead Summer House; 54.17288°N 2.93180°W		19th century	The summer house consists of a square stone two-stage tower with a projecting embattled parapet. There are pointed windows on the east and west faces, an entrance in the east face, and on the south face are steps leading to a pointed entrance in the upper floor.	II
Boundary wall with bee boles, Beckside Cottage; 54.21649°N 2.96316°W	—	19th century	The boundary wall incorporates bee boles, consisting of five rectangular chambers, and to the northwest are two larger bee boles. All are set into a stone wall with lintels and coping stones.	II
Lamppost; 54.20146°N 2.95251°W	—	19th century (probable)	The lamppost is in the churchyard of Cartmel Priory. It is in cast iron, and has a fluted column, cross arms, and a lantern that has a cylindrical top flue with a cap.	II
Limekiln near Low Frith Farm; 54.20632°N 3.01398°W		19th century (probable)	The limekiln is in limestone. On the west side is a segmental-arched recess above which is a narrow projecting course. The chamber is lined with bricks.	II
Lock-up Shop; 54.20097°N 2.95450°W	—	19th century (probable)	The shop is in roughcast stone with limestone dressings, two storeys and one bay. The windows, which are casements, have stone jambs and lintels.	II
Quaker Meeting House, stable and wall 54.19900°N 2.94819°W	—	1859	The Quaker meeting house was designed by Alfred Waterhouse, and is in roughcast stone with dressings in rusticated limestone, and a green slate roof. There is a single storey and a T-shaped plan with a north front of four bays containing a gabled porch. The windows have segmental heads. To the east is a separate gig house with an open front, and a stable. These are in stone, with quoins and a green slate roof, and the stable has a doorway with a fanlight. The area is enclosed by limestone walls, and the entrance is flanked by rusticated stone piers with caps.	II
St Mary's Church; 54.18310°N 2.94278°W		1864–65	The church, designed by E. G. Paley, is in limestone with sandstone dressings, buttresses, and slate roofs with coped gables. It consists of a nave, a south aisle, a south porch, and a chancel with a north vestry and organ loft. At the west end is an octagonal bell turret surmounted by a spirelet.	II
Allithwaite Primary School and Old School House; 54.18349°N 2.94198°W	—	1860s (probable)	The school and house were designed by E. G. Paley, and are in stone with slate roofs, the house partly roughcast. The school has one storey and three bays, the house has two storeys and one bay. Most of the windows have pointed heads, the school has a bellcote in the middle bay, and the house has a canted bay window with a hipped roof.	II
Pump opposite The Causeway; 54.19959°N 2.94973°W	—	1866	The pump stands in a stone walled recess. It has a spout, a handle, wooden casing, a stone trough, and a step. In the back wall is a datestone, and on the walls are weathered limestone blocks.	II
Stable range, Boarbank Farm; 54.18250°N 2.95127°W	—	1878	The stable range is in limestone with sandstone dressings, quoins and a slate roof. There are two storeys and seven bays; the outer two bays project forward on both sides and are gabled, and the central bay projects as a clock tower. The windows have rusticated jambs; those in the ground floor have grills above, and in the upper floor they have round heads. Also in the upper floor are two pitching holes. The tower has a segmental headed throughway, above which is a loading door, and in the top floor is a datestone. On each side is a clock face. On the top is a pavilion roof with an open timber cupola, a lead-covered domical vault and a weathervane.	II
Cartmel War Memorial; 54.20102°N 2.95253°W		1920	The war memorial is in the churchyard of Cartmel Priory. It is in sandstone, and consists of a Celtic cross on a four-sided plinth and a two-stepped square base. On the front of the cross-head and the upper shaft is strapwork carving, and on the plinth are inscriptions and the names of those lost in the two World Wars.	II
Village Lock-up; 54.20126°N 2.95499°W	—	Undated	The former village lock-up is in stone, partly roughcast, with quoins and a slate roof. It has a rectangular plan and two storeys. In the gable end facing the street is a blocked entrance with a lintel, and above is a mullioned window with iron bars. The entrance is on the right side.	II
