= Allithwaite and Cartmel =

Civil parish in Cumbria, England

Coordinates: 54.181°N 2.942°W

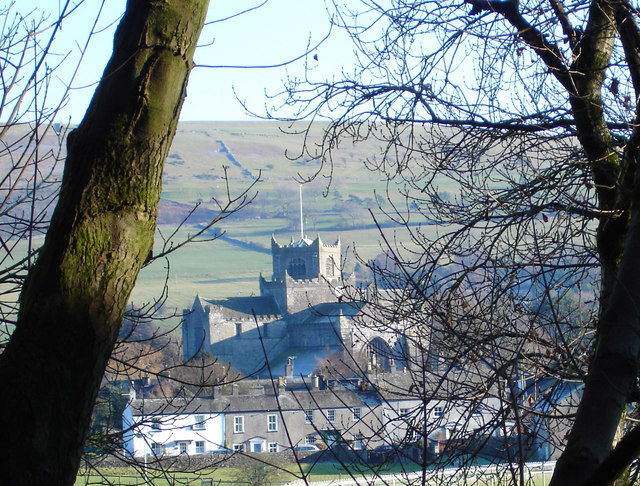
- Cartmel Priory

- Location within Cumbria
- Population: 1,831 (2011)
- OS grid reference: SD3876
- Civil parish: Allithwaite and Cartmel
- Unitary authority: Westmorland and Furness
- Ceremonial county: Cumbria
- Region: North West
- Country: England
- Sovereign state: United Kingdom
- Post town: GRANGE OVER SANDS
- Postcode district: LA11
- Dialling code: 01539
- Police: Cumbria
- Fire: Cumbria
- Ambulance: North West
- UK Parliament: Westmorland and Lonsdale

Allithwaite and Cartmel is a civil parish in the Westmorland and Furness district of the English county of Cumbria. It includes the villages of Allithwaite and Cartmel, the historic Cartmel Priory, Humphrey Head and Cartmel Racecourse. In the 2001 census the parish had a population of 1,758, increasing at the 2011 census to 1,831.

The name of the civil parish was changed from Lower Allithwaite to Allithwaite and Cartmel with effect from 29 July 2020.

== See also ==
- Listed buildings in Allithwaite and Cartmel
