= Cartmel Priory Gatehouse =

Medieval building in Cartmel, Cumbria, England

Coordinates: 54.2010°N 2.9547°W

Cartmel Priory Gatehouse is a medieval building located at Cartmel, Grange-over-Sands, Cumbria, England. It is listed Grade II* and is part of a scheduled monument. It belongs to the National Trust.

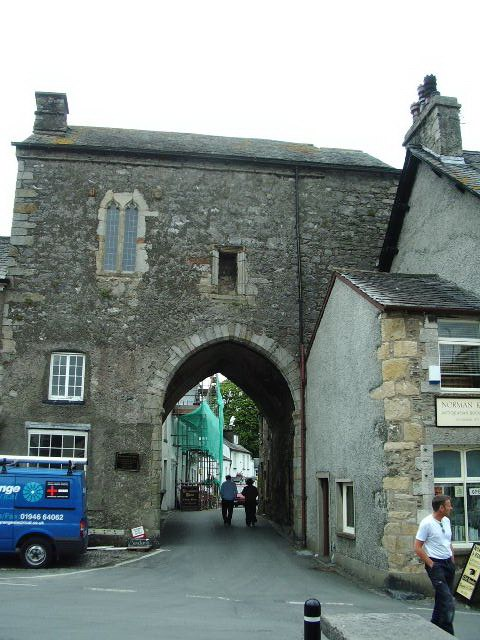
The gatehouse seen from the village square

Along with the church, the gatehouse is all that remains of the Augustinian Cartmel Priory. The priory was founded in 1190 whereas the gatehouse was built about 1330. In 1536 the Priory was dissolved as part of the general reformation of Church. Most of the monastic property was demolished, but the gatehouse was by that time serving as courthouse for the manor of Cartmel, so survived. It is described by Historic England as an excellent example of a medieval monastic gatehouse.

The building served as a grammar school from 1624 to 1790. In 1923 the gatehouse became a museum, and was used for exhibitions and meetings, before being presented to the National Trust in 1946. By 2011 it was mainly in private residential use, although the Great Room is opened to the public on several days a year.

== See also ==
- Grade II* listed buildings in Westmorland and Furness
- Listed buildings in Lower Allithwaite
- Cartmel Racecourse
- Cark and Cartmel railway station
