= Cartmel Priory School =

Cartmel Priory CofE School

Location
- Headless Cross; Cartmel, Cumbria, LA7 7SA; England; 54°11′54″N 2°57′01″W

Information
- Type: Academy
- Motto: Faith and Courage
- Religious affiliation: Church of England
- Established: 1958
- Local authority: Westmorland and Furness
- Department for Education URN: 137338 Tables
- Ofsted: Reports
- Headteacher: S Beestone
- Gender: Coeducational
- Age: 11 to 16
- Enrolment: 330
- Website: https://www.cartmelprioryschool.co.uk/

Cartmel Priory CofE School is a mixed 11-16 Church of England comprehensive secondary school and academy in Cartmel, Cumbria, England.

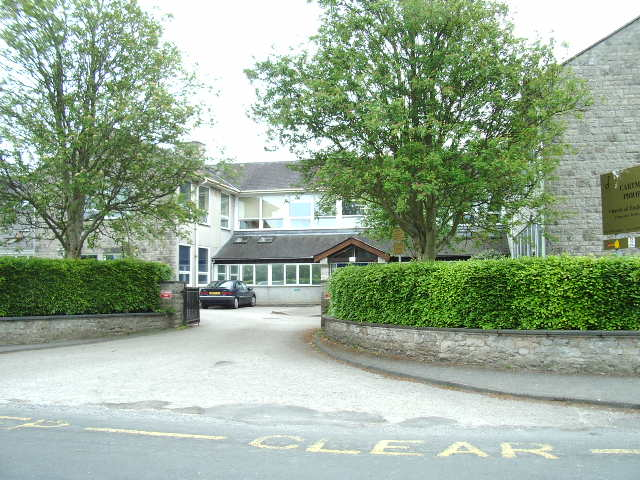
The school entrance

== History ==
Cartmel Priory School replaced Cartmel Grammar School. The earliest reference to this school is in 1598, so it was likely founded after the Dissolution of the Monasteries to replace whatever education the canons of the former Cartmel Priory had previously provided. The school was initially housed in the church, and after 1624 Cartmel Priory Gatehouse, before moving in 1740 to a new site outside the village. The grammar school was abolished in 1911. The gatehouse is now a historic monument owned by the National Trust, while the later building is now a hotel known as Cartmel Old Grammar.

The present school was opened in 1958 on land given by Lord Richard Cavendish, built with money from the Church and the local community. The school was officially opened on 15 October 1958 by Her Royal Highness, The Princess Margaret. The school maintains ties with Cartmel Priory Church, with pupils attending several services a year.
