= Lonsdale Hundred =

Historical division of Lancashire, England

Coordinates: 54.15°N 2.82°W

Hundred of Lonsdale
- Lancashire Hundred

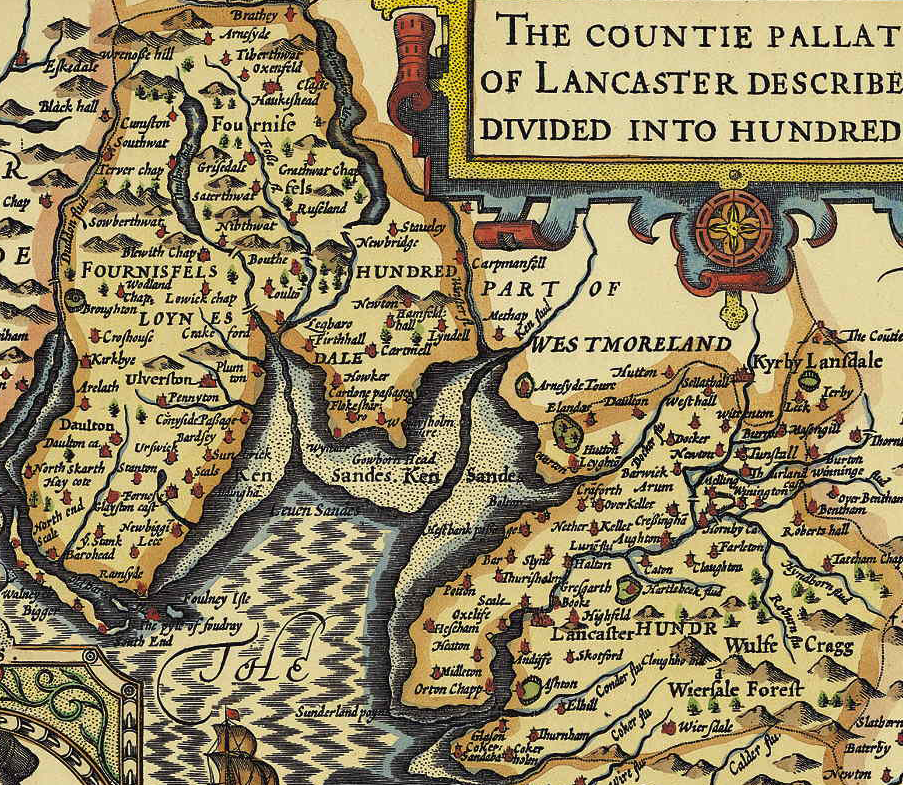
- Lonsdale Hundred depicted in John Speed's 1610 map of Lancashire
- Area
  - 1831: 1,237,970 acres (5,009.9 km^{2})
- History
  - Created: Before 1168
  - Abolished: Mid-19th Century, however never formally abolished
  - Succeeded by: North Lonsdale Rural District, Lancaster Rural District
- Status: Ancient Hundred
  - HQ: Lancaster
- Subdivisions
  - Type: Parish(es)
  - Units: South of the Sands; Lancaster (part) • Cockerham (part) • Heysham; Halton • Bolton-Le-Sands • Warton • Burton (part) • Melling • Claughton • Tatham • Tunstall • Whittington • Thornton (part); North of the Sands; Cartmel Furness • Dalton • Aldingham • Urswick • Pennington • Ulverston • Hawkshead • Colton • Kirkby Ireleth

Hundreds of Lancashire

The Lonsdale Hundred was a hundred of the historic county of Lancashire, England. Although named after the dale or valley of the River Lune, which runs through the city of Lancaster, for centuries it covered most of the north-western part of Lancashire around Morecambe Bay, including the detached parts of Furness and the Cartmel Peninsula. Ironically, only some of the detached part of North Lonsdale still remains partly within a British parliamentary constituency under the name of Lonsdale, being part of the Westmorland and Lonsdale constituency.

Lonsdale was not recorded as a hundred in the Domesday Book of 1086, but the name does appear, in the returns for Yorkshire, apparently as a manor attached to Cockerham. A number of places within the Lune's watershed are traditionally named with specification of 'in Lonsdale': Kirkby Lonsdale, Burton-in-Lonsdale, and Thornton-in-Lonsdale retain the name, while Middleton, Sedbergh, Ingleton and Newby, near Clapham have previously been recorded with it. Following the creation of the hundred sometime during the late 11th or early 12th centuries, parts of the district were included in Westmorland and others in Craven within the West Riding of Yorkshire. The hundred had been defined by 1168 and the bailiwick was granted to Adam de Kellet (of Nether Kellet) in 1199.

Other places in the Lonsdale hundred included Lancaster, Bolton-le-Sands, Barrow-in-Furness, Dalton-in-Furness, Ulverston, and Morecambe. The Furness Peninsula and the Cartmel Peninsula were known as Lonsdale North of the Sands, the major part of which later constituted (from 1894 to 1974) the North Lonsdale Rural District.

In 1831, the population of males over twenty years old was given as 10,707, meaning the total population would likely be over 20,000 during that year.
