= Allithwaite =

Village in Cumbria, England

Coordinates: 54.1802°N 2.9398°W

- Village
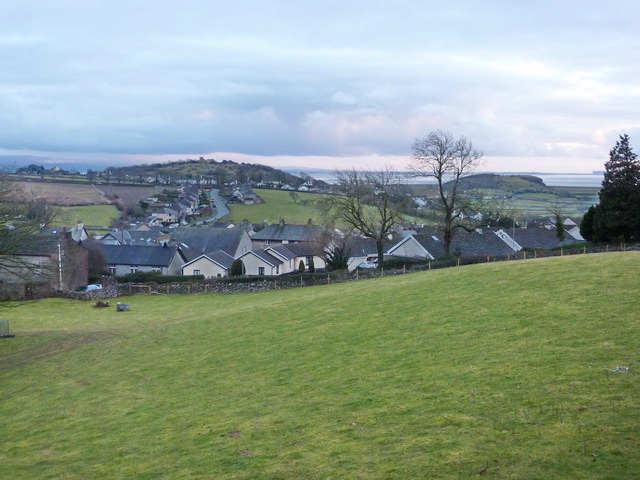
- Allithwaite

- Location within Cumbria
- OS grid reference: SD386764
- Civil parish: Allithwaite and Cartmel
- Unitary authority: Westmorland and Furness
- Ceremonial county: Cumbria
- Region: North West
- Country: England
- Sovereign state: United Kingdom
- Post town: GRANGE-OVER-SANDS
- Postcode district: LA11
- Dialling code: 015395
- Police: Cumbria
- Fire: Cumbria
- Ambulance: North West
- UK Parliament: Westmorland and Lonsdale

Allithwaite is a village in Cumbria, England, located roughly 1.2 miles (1.9 km) west of Grange-over-Sands. Within the boundaries of the historic county of Lancashire, Allithwaite, and the village of Cartmel situated to the north, are part of the civil parish of Allithwaite and Cartmel. At the 2001 census, the parish had a population of 1,758, increasing to 1,831 at the 2011 Census.

There is also a civil parish previously known as Upper Allithwaite which was renamed in 2018 as Lindale and Newton-in-Cartmel, and includes Lindale, Low Newton and High Newton. The population of this parish at the 2011 Census was 843. The two parishes were formerly one, before the emergence of Grange between them in the 19th century.

== Background and amenities ==
Most of the residents of Allithwaite commute to Ulverston, Barrow-in-Furness, Kendal or Lancaster to work.

The Anglican parish church is St. Mary's Church, built in 1864–65 and designed by the Lancaster architect Edward Graham Paley. There is a small primary school, Allithwaite Primary C of E School, located next to the church. Both church and school were built by a legacy left to the village by Mary Lambert of Boarbank Hall. The village also has a pub (formerly two), a children's playground and a playing field with a tennis court, a pump track and a bowling green.

== Wraysholme Tower ==
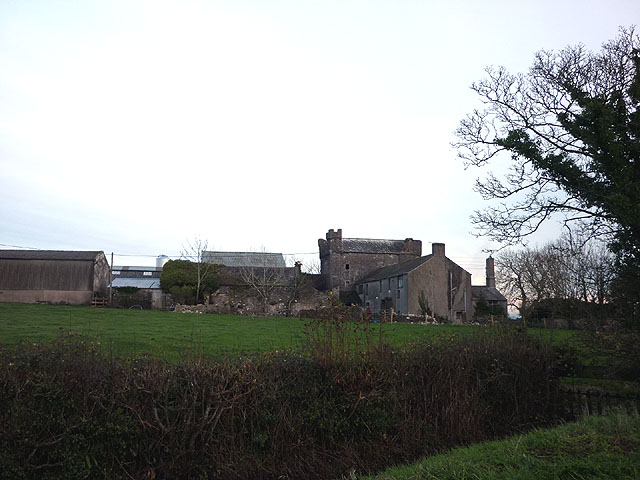
Wraysholme Tower

A mile to the south, Wraysholme Tower is a 15th-century pele tower, now in agricultural use, which abuts a farmhouse dating from the 19th century, on the site of a medieval hall. The tower was built by the Harrington family of Aldingham. A Michael Harrington acquired a grant of free warren in Aldingham in 1315. Throughout the 14th and 15th centuries, the Harringtons (or Haringtons) were major benefactors of nearby Cartmel Priory. The tower, 40 feet (12 m) by 28 feet (8.5 m) and with walls 4 feet (1.2 m) thick at their base, is constructed from limestone rubble. There was originally an entrance at the north-west corner. The roof is of slate. Unusually for a pele tower, there is a projecting turret at each corner. As of 2026, the tower, which is a scheduled ancient monument, is on Historic England's Heritage at Risk Register.

== Boarbank Hall ==
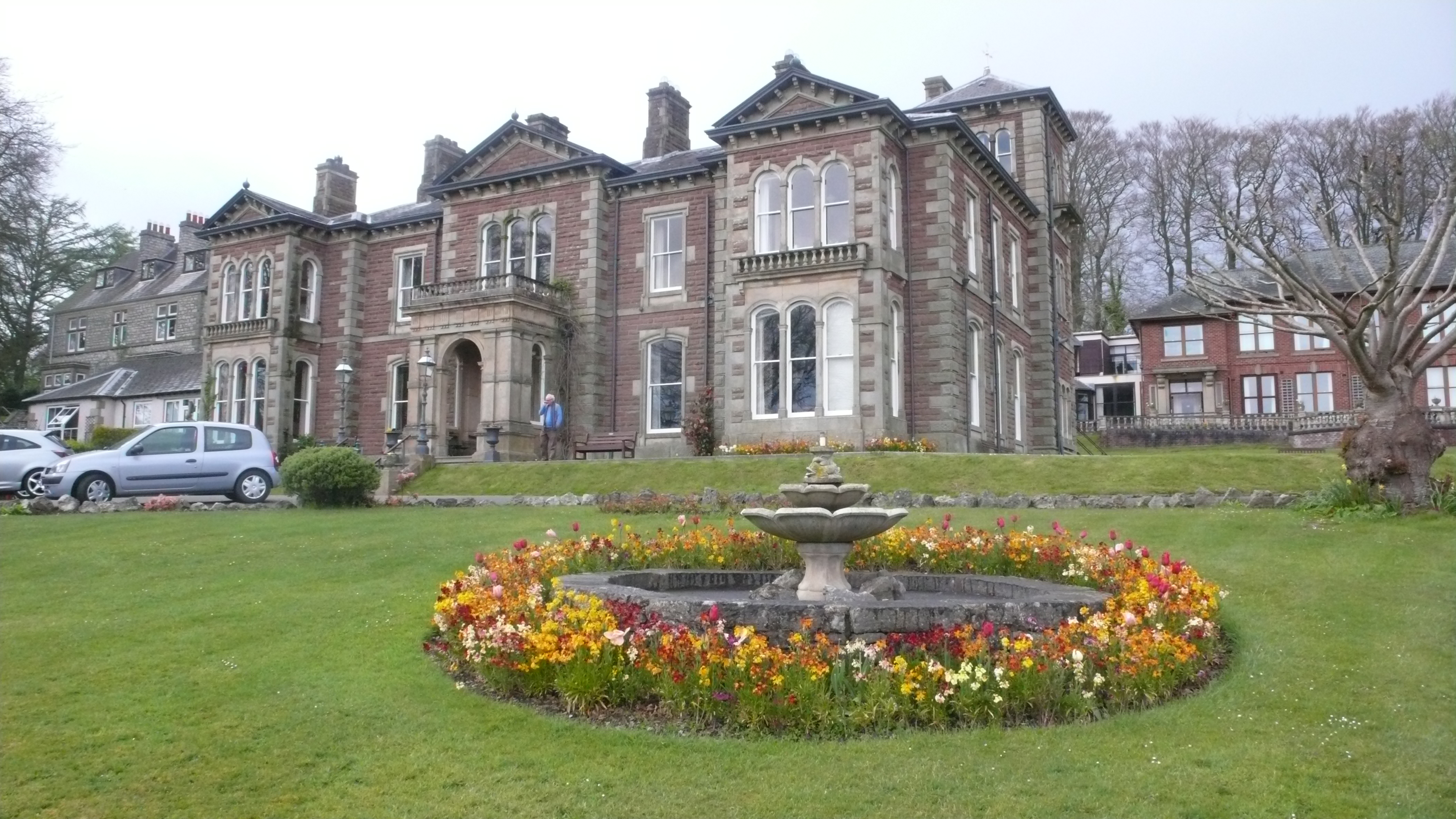
Boarbank Hall

Boarbank Hall, to the west of the village, is a convent, nursing home and guest house, with a community of twelve Augustinian sisters and two Benedictine sisters. There has been a house on the site since at least 1592, but the present house, in an Italian style, was built in 1870 after a fire had destroyed the previous frontage. The Augustinian Cannonesses acquired the house in 1921. The Oratory, built in 1986, was the subject of an episode of BBC television's Building Sights, featuring architect Richard MacCormac, in 1991.

== Governance ==
Allithwaite lies within the Westmorland and Lonsdale parliamentary constituency, and its current MP is Tim Farron, former leader of the Liberal Democrats. Since 2023 the village has been part of the Westmorland and Furness Unitary Authority, replacing the former South Lakeland District Council.

== Transport ==
The service has one bus route operated by Stagecoach, the 530 to Cartmel then Kendal. The nearest railway station is at Kents Bank.

== See also ==
- Listed buildings in Lower Allithwaite
