= Cark & Cartmel railway station =

Railway station in Cumbria, England

Cark & Cartmel
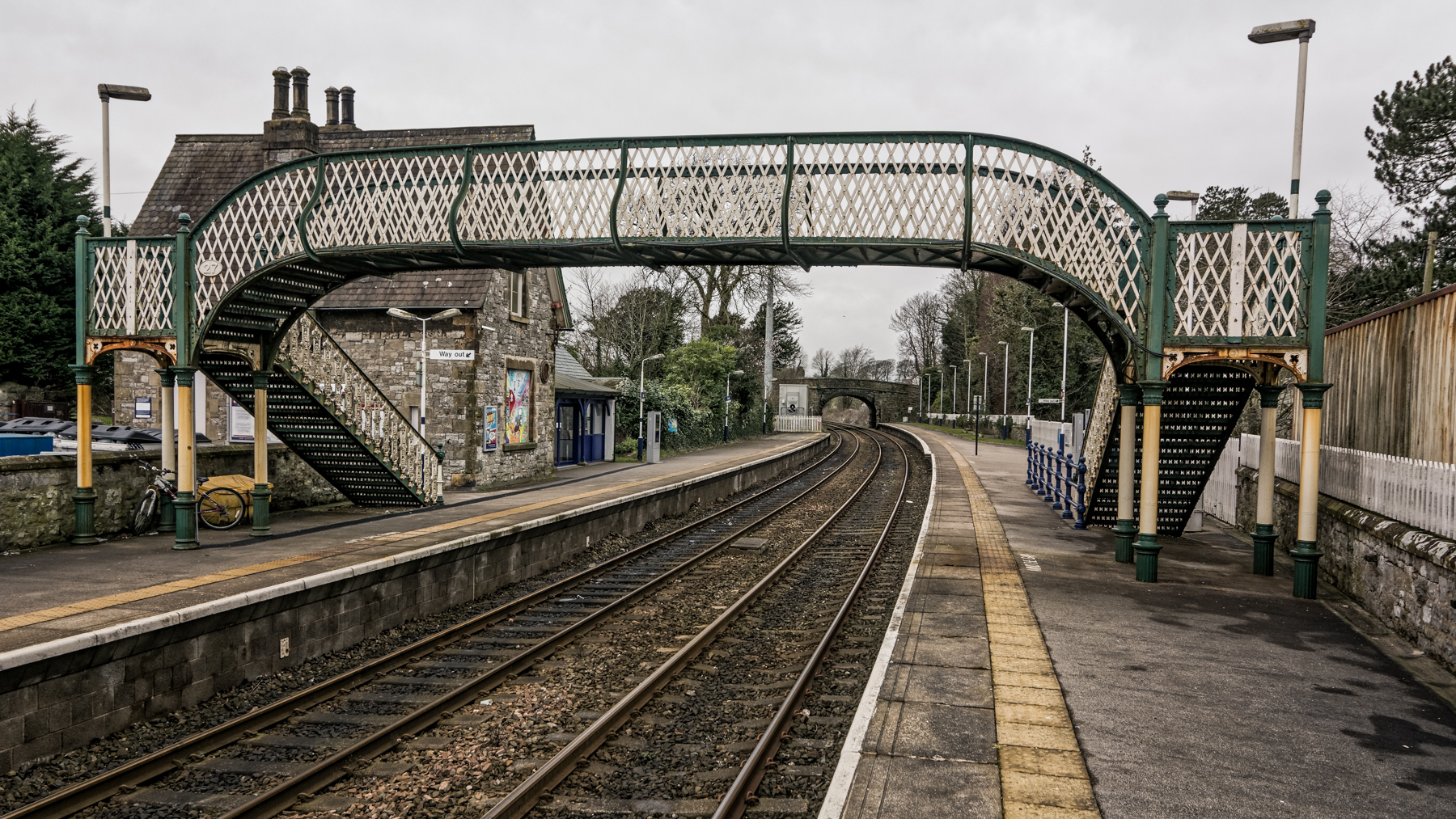

General information
- Location: Cark, Westmorland and Furness; England
- Coordinates: 54°10′41″N 2°58′26″W
- Grid reference: SD365762
- Owner: Network Rail
- Manager: Northern Trains
- Platforms: 2
- Tracks: 2

Other information
- Station code: CAK
- Classification: DfT category F2

History
- Original company: Ulverstone and Lancaster Railway
- Pre-grouping: Furness Railway
- Post-grouping: London, Midland and Scottish Railway; British Rail (London Midland Region)

Key dates
- 1 September 1857: Opened

Passengers
- 2020/21: ▼24,112
- 2021/22: ▲78,306
- 2022/23: ▲84,244
- 2023/24: ▲84,822
- 2024/25: ▲93,858
Location
- Location within the former South Lakeland district Location within Cumbria
Notes
- Passenger statistics from the Office of Rail and Road

Cark & Cartmel is a railway station on the Furness line, which runs between Barrow-in-Furness and Lancaster. The station, situated 15 1/4 miles (25 km) north-east of Barrow-in-Furness, serves the villages of Allithwaite, Cark, Cartmel and Flookburgh in Cumbria. It is owned by Network Rail and managed by Northern Trains.

== History ==
The station is architecturally interesting, with buildings constructed by the Ulverstone and Lancaster Railway. The station opened on 1 September 1857 as Cark-in-Cartmell. The station was then renamed a number of times, including Cark, Cark and Cartmel and Cark-in-Cartmel, with the current name adopted on 13 May 1984.

The Furness Railway took over the Ulverstone and Lancaster Railway on 21 January 1862. It was later absorbed into the London, Midland and Scottish Railway on 1 January 1923.

The station had a particular importance, as it serves Holker Hall, the home of Lord Cavendish of Furness formerly belonging to the Dukes of Devonshire. Special waiting rooms were provided for the dukes and their guests. The actual building retains many original features and is now a private residence. It extends to approximately one acre of gardens and woodland.

== Facilities ==
The station is unstaffed but has been provided with ticket machines to allow intending travellers to buy tickets prior to travel. There are shelters and digital information screens on each platform, along with a long-line PA system for train running information provision. The platforms are linked by a footbridge, but step-free access is also available on each side for disabled travellers.

== Service ==
The station is on the Furness line linking Lancaster and Barrow (though some services extend south to Preston or north east to Carlisle). The station receives a roughly hourly service to Barrow-in-Furness, with a limited number of services continuing to Carlisle via Whitehaven.

There is also a roughly hourly service towards Lancaster, with a limited number of services continuing to Preston. A number of services continue through to Manchester Airport. These were formerly operated by First TransPennine Express up until the end of the old Northern and TransPennine franchises on 31 March 2016. Sundays see an hourly service each way (with some longer gaps).

Preceding station	National Rail	Following station
Ulverston	Northern Trains; Furness line	Kents Bank
Ulverston	Northern Trains; Furness line	Grange-over-Sands
	Historical railways	
Grange-over-Sands	Furness Railway	Kents Bank
