= River Eea =

River in Cumbria, England

Coordinates: 54°10′20″N 2°59′36″W

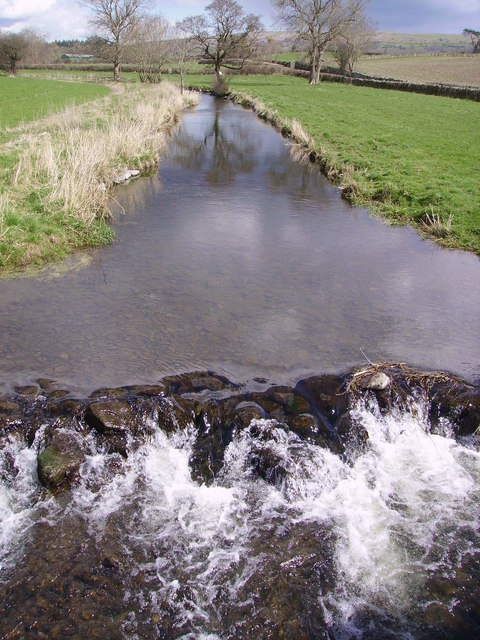
The Eea near Cark

The River Eea (/ˈiːə/) is a small river in the Lake District, Cumbria, England running through the Furness region, which until 1974 was part of Lancashire. It is a relatively short system that arises from numerous small becks and streams throughout the Cartmel Valley. Its course is approximately 10 km long and its mouth is on Sand Gate marshes near Flookburgh, between Barrow and Kendal. It principally flows in a south-westerly direction.

== Geography ==
The river's source is a spring in the hills, meaning it flows all year round. Its upper course is called Whitestone Beck. The river's main tributaries are Muddypool and Ayside Beck, which converge above Cartmel.

The river rises near High Cark in Newton Fell and the Whitestone Enclosure, and is soon fed by Black Beck (emanating from Fair Rigg south of Staveley-in-Cartmel) and Ayside Pool (rising above Ayside).

From there, the River Eea runs past Green Bank and through Cartmel and Cark before flowing via Sand Gate Marsh into the estuary of the River Leven at Lenibrick Point, close to Chapel Island. The section above Cark has been re-routed to serve as a water supply to Cark Mill, and there is a branch serving a farm near the railway station. The original use was to drive a water wheel at the cotton mill, but about 1800 a steam engine was added to pump water back up to the upper leat to redouble the supply. The Engine Inn in Cark was named from this local detail. The river is now used as a fieldwork study point for the Castle Head Field Studies Centre where students can measure variables of the river such as the stream velocity, width, depth, turbidity, pebble roundedness, sinuosity etc.

The name may be derived from plenty of eels gathering in its lower course during high tides ("eea" was a Viking word for eel), or from the Old Cumbrian "ia" (ice), or the Old English "ēa" (a river).

== Geology ==
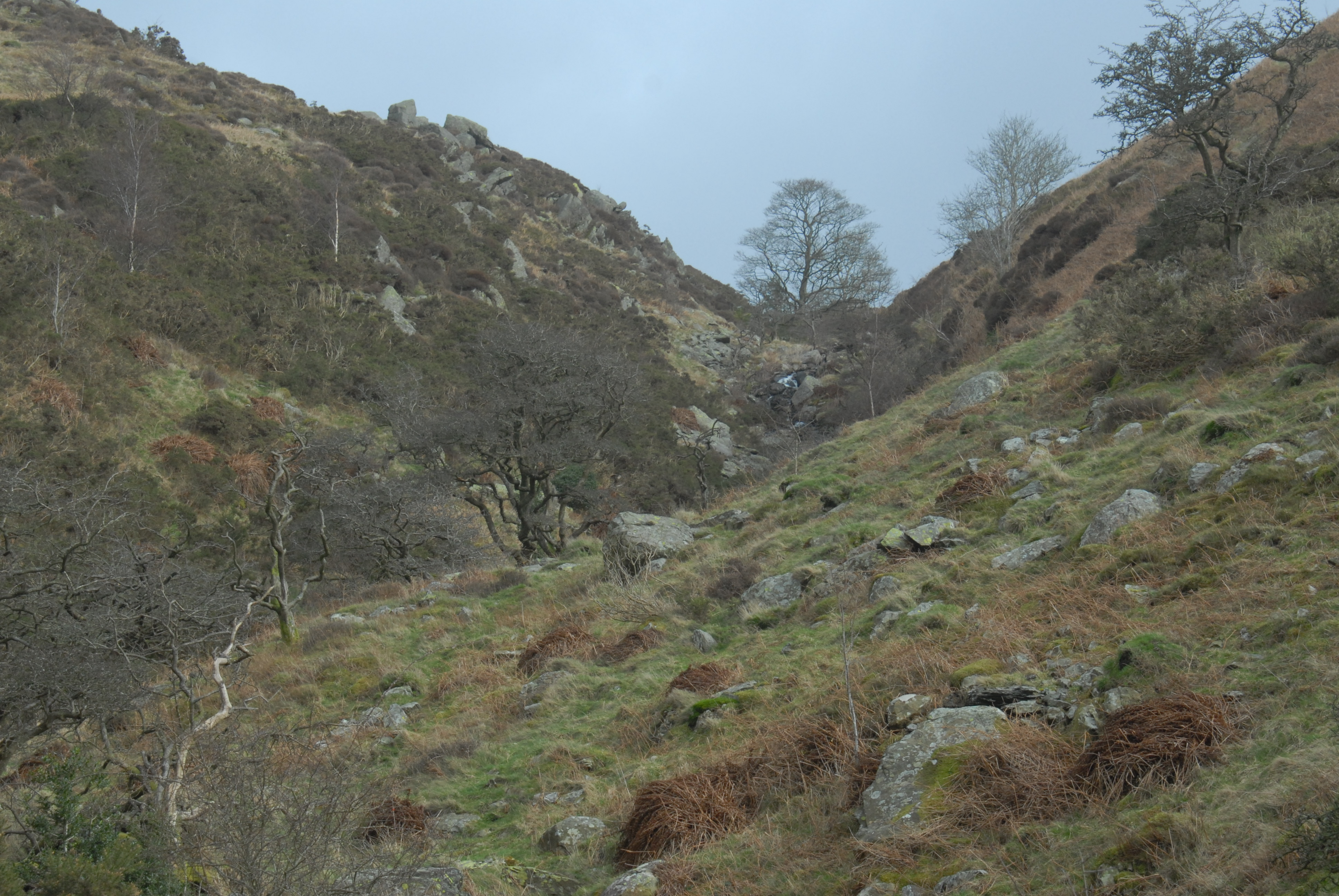
The Eea in Whitestone Enclosure

To the west of the catchment area the rock is mainly slate, but to the east there are deposits of limestone. Sinkholes in the limestone can cause the river to disappear for some time.

== Fishing ==
The river is stocked with brown trout, but wild brown and sea trout are also found and fished from the river.
