= Cartmel Racecourse =

Horse racing venue in England

Coordinates: 54°12′11″N 2°57′21″W

Cartmel

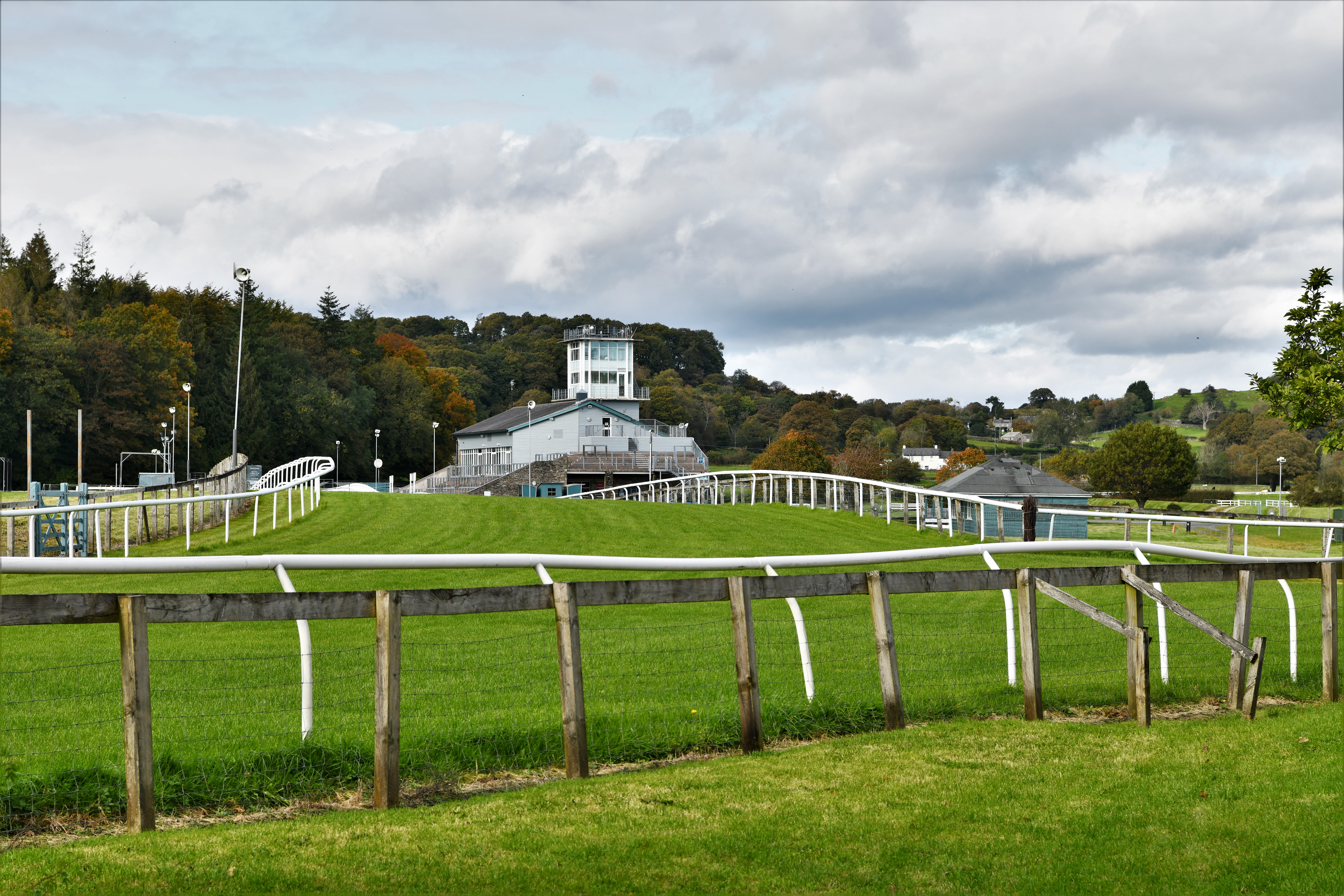
- The stand viewed from the entrance to the home straight
- Interactive map of Cartmel
- Location: Cartmel, Cumbria
- Screened on: Racing TV
- Course type: National Hunt

Cartmel Racecourse is a small national hunt racecourse in the village of Cartmel, now in the ceremonial county of Cumbria, historically in Lancashire. Until 1969, the two day Whitsun meeting was Cartmel's only fixture, when an August Bank Holiday Monday meeting was introduced. In 1974, a Saturday programme was added to the new meeting, making a total of four days' racing.

Nine racedays are now held each year, starting on the Whit Holiday weekend at the end of May and ending on the August Bank Holiday weekend in August.

The three-day May race meeting actually takes place over five days – allowing a day off for racegoers to enjoy the Lake District countryside in between each day at the races. The racegoers arrive so early in the day and leave so late that, unlike most racecourses, there is not time to clear up and turn the racecourse around for consecutive days racing.

The two-day July meeting (taking place over three days, with a day off in-between) features the most valuable race at Cartmel, the Cumbria Crystal Hurdle Race, which is worth over £40,000.

The August race meeting features the Cartmel Cup (a hurdle race) and the Cavendish Cup (a steeplechase).

Although the racecourse is considered to be small, it often has the third-highest average attendance of any jumps track in Britain after Aintree and Cheltenham – the largest crowds can be just over 20,000 on one day. The visitors gather in the centre of the racecourse which is bisected by the finishing straight. On one side of the straight is a very large fairground and on the other the Parade Ring and Winners' Enclosure. There is a small grandstand, but in general most of the facilities at Cartmel are temporary. The village shops are a short walk from the track and a visit to the village is often considered to be a significant part of a day at Cartmel races.

Cartmel Racecourse is about 1-mile (1.6 km) round, with six fences, and is noted as having a four-furlong (804 metre) run-in on the Steeplechase course, the longest in Britain. The run in on the Hurdle track is slightly less than 2 furlongs (402 metres). All winning connections receive a Cartmel Sticky Toffee Pudding to take home.

The origins of racing at Cartmel are rather obscure, with some stories suggesting that the meeting first started with mule races organised by medieval monks from Cartmel Priory to make their journeys across the sands to Lancaster more interesting. There are records of racing for the Innkeepers' Stakes of £15 and the Tradesmen's Stakes of £30 in 1856. Hound trailing and foot races were also a part of the programme at that time. At the meeting in 1869 there were not enough horses entered for the races, so there was great interest in the human runners, including a T. Dowrie, who won three races. In 1875, the foot races were abolished and the meeting held under Grand National Rules.

The course was supported by local landowners. Until World War II, it was a very small course featuring primarily amateur jockeys, but in the second half of the 20th century the racing programme was expanded and professionalised. Cartmel Racecourse and its surrounding land have long been owned by the Holker Estate, where the Cavendish family still reside. Hugh Cavendish became a Director on the Board of Cartmel Racecourse in 1974 and in 1998, bought out the management team to develop it further under the guidance of his allies at Aintree. This has seen the course go from strength-to-strength, and it continues to grow in stature and service year-on-year.

Cartmel was the site of the Gay Future 'coup' in 1974 that involved switching horses before a race and relying on the lack of communications at the course.

The most popular racehorse at Cartmel in recent seasons is Soul Magic, who has won at the track on seven occasions - prior to the 2014 racing season.
