= Kents Bank railway station =

Railway station in Cumbria, England

Kents Bank
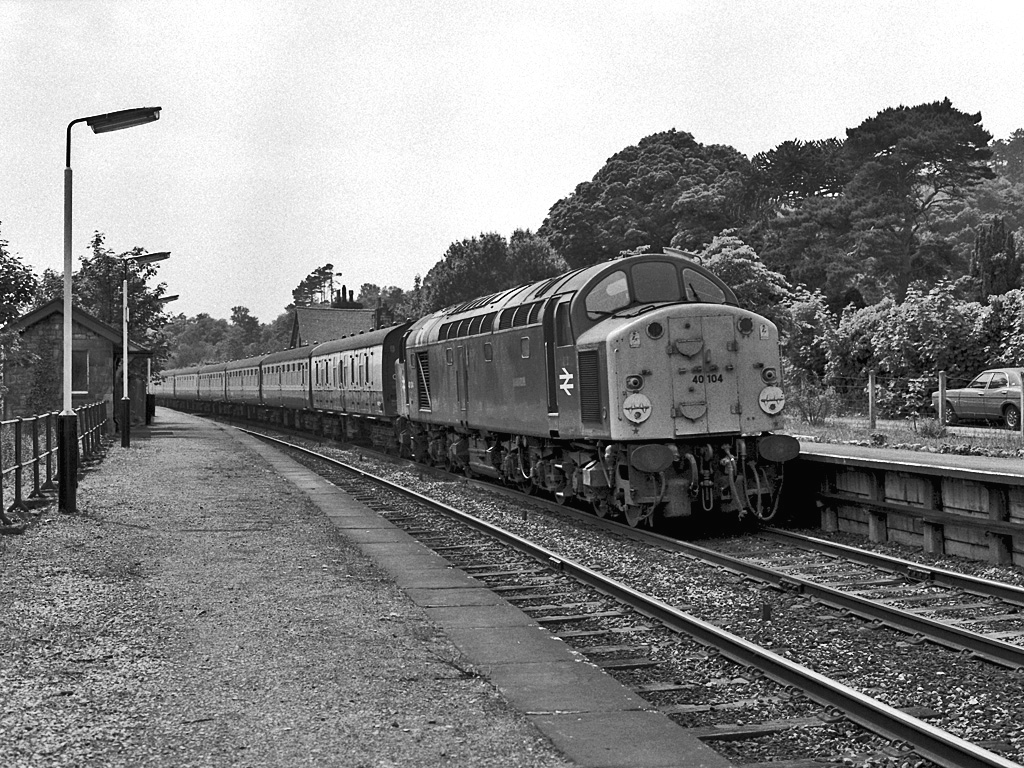

General information
- Location: Kents Bank, Westmorland and Furness; England
- Coordinates: 54°10′22″N 2°55′31″W
- Grid reference: SD396756
- Owner: Network Rail
- Manager: Northern Trains
- Platforms: 2

Other information
- Station code: KBK
- Classification: DfT category F2

History
- Original company: Ulverstone and Lancaster Railway
- Pre-grouping: Furness Railway
- Post-grouping: London, Midland and Scottish Railway; British Rail (London Midland Region)

Key dates
- 1 September 1857: Opened

Passengers
- 2020/21: ▼9,534
- 2021/22: ▲23,956
- 2022/23: ▲24,938
- 2023/24: ▲26,724
- 2024/25: ▲30,544
Location
- Location within the former South Lakeland district Location within Cumbria
Notes
- Passenger statistics from the Office of Rail and Road

Kents Bank is a railway station on the Furness Line, which runs between Barrow-in-Furness and Lancaster. The station, situated 17 1/4 miles (28 km) north-west of Lancaster, serves the village of Kents Bank in Cumbria. It is owned by Network Rail and managed by Northern Trains.

== History ==
The first station on the site opened in 1857 as part of the Ulverston and Lancaster Railway, but it closed shortly afterwards owing to a lack of passenger traffic. The present station buildings were designed in 1865 by the Lancaster-based architects, Paley and Austin, for the Furness Railway.

== Facilities ==
The station is unstaffed but now has ticket machines available, allowing passenger to buy before boarding. Shelters are located on each platform, along with digital information screens and a PA system. Access to the northbound platform is via a user-worked barrier level crossing, so whilst it has step-free access disabled travellers should exercise caution when crossing the line.

The former station building is now a private residence, but since January 2024, its basement has housed a library specialising in railway books. It has several thousand titles in stock, and these are available for reference or loan. It is run by volunteers and is free to use. An extension to the building, including a derelict toilet block, is used as an art gallery.

== Services ==
Kents Bank is served by Northern Trains, who operate a regular service between Barrow-in-Furness and Lancaster. Certain northbound trains are extended to Whitehaven and Carlisle, and several southbound trains are extended to Preston and Manchester Airport. A (mostly) hourly service runs each way on Sundays.

Preceding station	National Rail	Following station
Cark and Cartmel	Northern Trains; Furness Line	Grange-over-Sands
