= Cartmel =

Village in Cumbria, England

Coordinates: 54.199°N 2.951°W

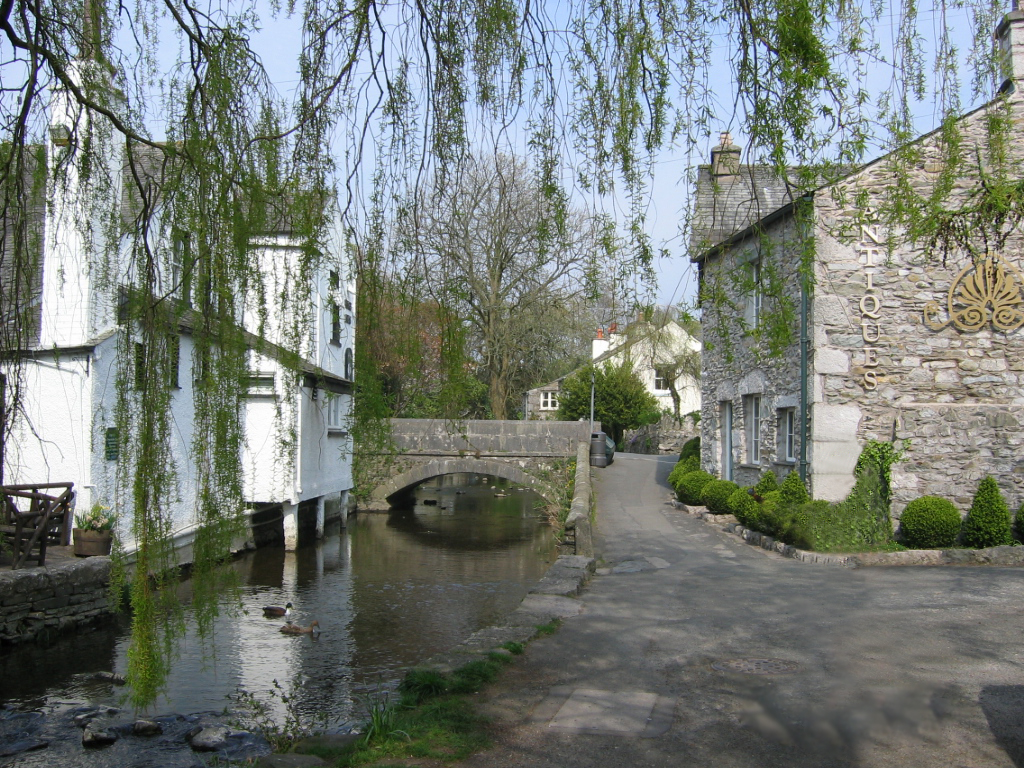
- Cartmel village by the River Eea

- Location within Cumbria
- OS grid reference: SD380786
- Civil parish: Allithwaite and Cartmel
- Unitary authority: Westmorland and Furness
- Ceremonial county: Cumbria
- Region: North West
- Country: England
- Sovereign state: United Kingdom
- Post town: GRANGE-OVER-SANDS
- Postcode district: LA11
- Dialling code: 015395
- Police: Cumbria
- Fire: Cumbria
- Ambulance: North West
- UK Parliament: Westmorland and Lonsdale

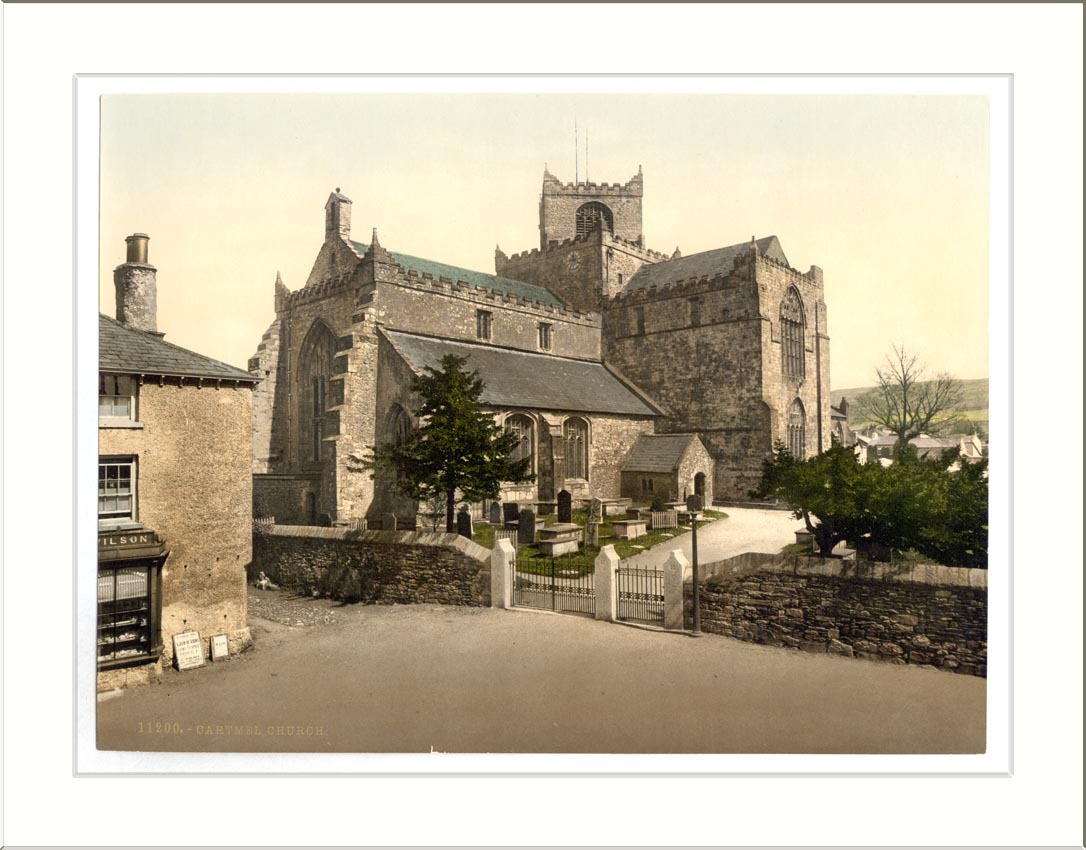
Cartmel Priory

Cartmel is a village in Westmorland and Furness (historically in "Lancashire-over-the-Sands"), in the ceremonial county of Cumbria, England, 2 1/4 miles (3.5 kilometres) northwest of Grange-over-Sands and close to the River Eea. The village takes its name from the Cartmel Peninsula, and it was historically known as Kirkby in Cartmel. The village is the location of the 12th-century Cartmel Priory, around which it initially grew. Situated in the historic county of Lancashire, since 1974 Cartmel was in the non-metropolitan county and ceremonial county of Cumbria, and for local government, in the unitary authority area of Westmorland and Furness.

Whilst its history has been in its ecclesiastical and agricultural communities, Cartmel has since the mid-20th century developed as a minor tourist destination, being just outside the Lake District National Park. Several attractions in the village, including Cartmel Racecourse and two Michelin-starred restaurants, cater to this tourist trade.

== History ==
The name Cartmel means "sandbank by rocky ground", from the Old Norse kartr ("rocky ground") and melr. The place-name is first attested in 677, when the Cartmel Peninsula was granted to St Cuthbert, whose influence may explain why by the Norman Conquest the village was known as Kirkby, a name indicating the location of a church.

Cartmel Priory was founded in the village in c.1190 by William Marshal, created 1st Earl of Pembroke, intended for a community of the Augustinian Canons regular and was dedicated to Saint Mary the Virgin and Saint Michael. To support the new house, William granted it the whole fief of the district of Cartmel. Following the dissolution of the monasteries, much of the local land fell into the ownership of the Preston family at nearby Holker Hall. Through marriage Holker became part of the estate of the Cavendish family, and today is the home of Lord Cavendish. As well as the estate around Holker, the Cavendish family still owns much of the land of the peninsula.

Agriculture was the chief industry of the area until the mid-20th century, dominated by the lands of the Cavendishes, and remains an important part of the village. Nearby Grange-over-Sands eclipsed Cartmel as the biggest settlement on the peninsula in the 19th century, growing as a Victorian seaside resort when the Furness Railway was built across the peninsula. Cartmel village is served by a station in nearby Cark, opened in 1857 and called Cark and Cartmel.

== Hospitality and tourism ==
Tourism has grown in the village since the middle of the 20th century. In 1923 Cartmel Priory Gatehouse became a museum for the Priory, and was used for exhibitions and meetings, before being presented to the National Trust in 1946. By 2011 it was mainly in private residential use, although the Great Room is opened to the public on several days a year. The Priory itself is still the local parish church, but is open to visitors outside of service times.

Cartmel Racecourse dates back to at least the 19th century, but grew in popularity when it became a National Hunt course after the Second World War. It started to attract major professionals in the 1960s, and now hosts nine meetings a year between May and August, the biggest traditionally in Whit Week.

Writers who encouraged the growth of tourism to Cartmel include Lancashire dialect writer and BBC broadcaster Thomas Thompson, who wrote sixteen books on Lancashire people and their communities and was fond of Cartmel. The frontispiece in his 1937 book Lancashire Brew is 'Cartmel from an etching by Joseph Knight', the founder of the Manchester School of Painters. Later Alfred Wainwright dedicated a chapter to Cartmel Fell, about 7 miles (11 km) north of Cartmel, in his 1974 book The Outlying Fells of Lakeland.

More recently Cartmel has emerged as a foodie destination. Cartmel sticky toffee pudding was first sold at the village shop in 1984 and grew in popularity: it is now sold in supermarkets around the UK. The Cartmel Sticky Toffee Company, who make it, moved to a larger factory in nearby Flookburgh in the 2000s but still operate and sell from the village shop in Cartmel. In 2002, chef Simon Rogan opened L'Enclume restaurant in the village. The restaurant quickly became one of the UK's most popular, and held top spot as the UK's best restaurant in The Good Food Guide from 2014–2017, returning to the top in 2020. In 2022 it became the first restaurant in the UK outside London and the South-East to gain 3 Michelin stars. Rogan makes use of the agricultural hinterland of Cartmel and most of the produce supplied to the restaurant is grown on the peninsula, including Rogan's nearby 12-acre (4.9 ha) farm. Rogan's second restaurant in Cartmel, Rogan & Co, is also Michelin-starred, and the village also hosts Unsworth's Yard, a collection of artisan-food retailers who use local produce.

== Transport ==
Cartmel is 2 1/4 miles (3.5 km) from the nearest town, Grange-over-Sands, and about 2 3/4 miles (4.5 km) from the A590 road, which connects it to the M6 Motorway. Cark and Cartmel railway station has a roughly hourly service between Barrow-in-Furness and Lancaster, with some services continuing north to Carlisle and others south to Manchester.

Stagecoach run service 530 from the village to Kendal via Grange-over-sands and Levens.

== Education ==
Cartmel Church of England Primary School is the village primary school. Cartmel Priory School takes pupils aged between 11 and 16 from around the Cartmel Peninsula.

== Governance ==
Cartmel is part of the Westmorland and Lonsdale parliamentary constituency, of which Tim Farron is the current Member of parliament representing the Liberal Democrats.

For local government purposes it is in the Grange and Cartmel Ward of Westmorland and Furness Council.

The village also has its own parish council, Lower Allithwaite Parish Council.
