= Hugh Cavendish, Baron Cavendish of Furness =

British Conservative politician and landowner (born 1941)

The Right Honourable The Lord Cavendish of Furness FRSA DL
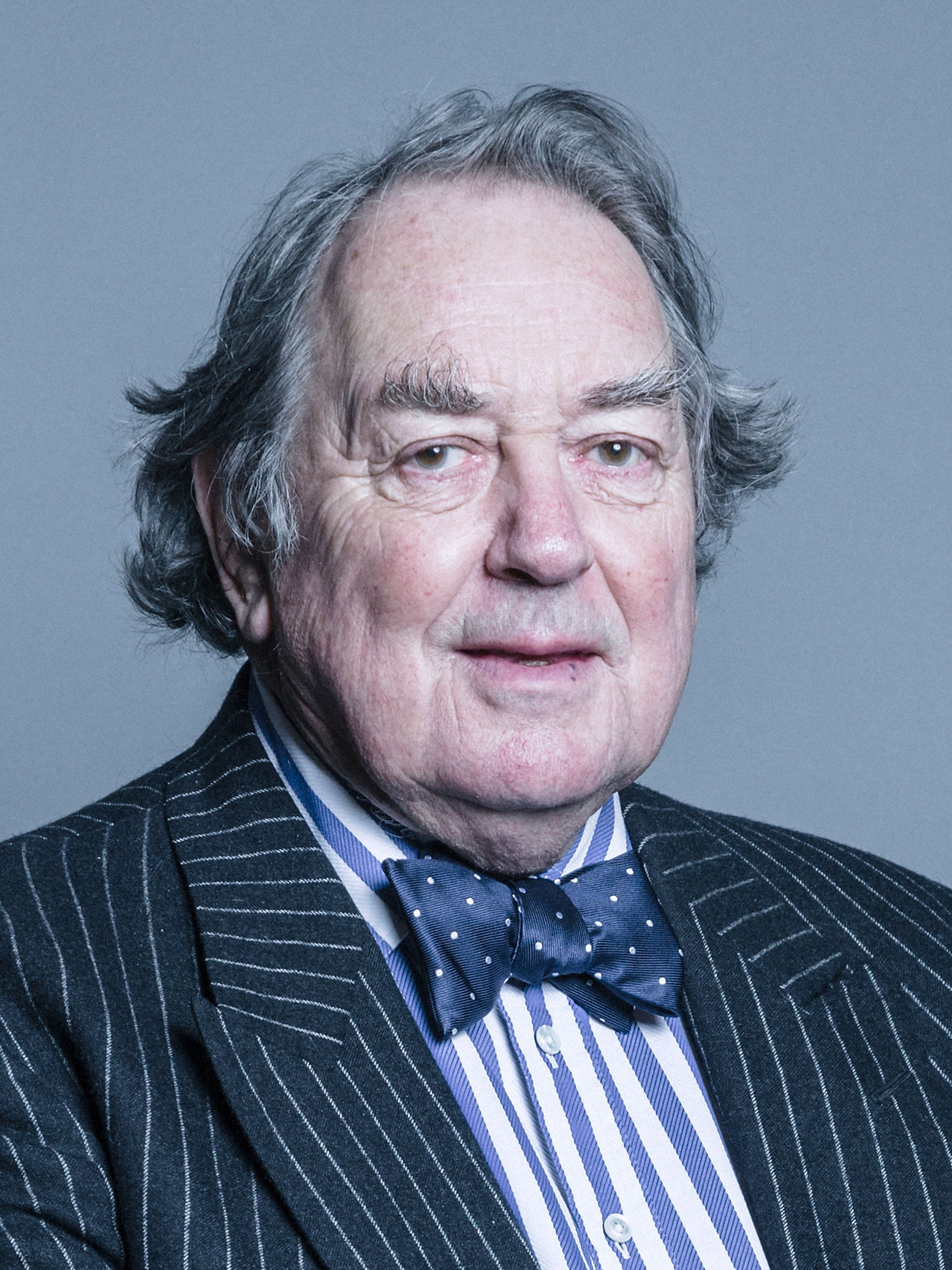
- Official portrait, 2018

Lord-in-waiting Government Whip
- In office 14 September 1990 – 22 April 1993
- Prime Minister: Margaret Thatcher; John Major
- Preceded by: The Baroness Blatch
- Succeeded by: The Viscount Astor

Member of the House of Lords
- Lord Temporal
- Life peerage 17 May 1990 – 1 January 2021

Personal details
- Born: Richard Hugh Cavendish; 2 November 1941 (age 85)
- Party: Conservative
- Spouse: Grania Caulfeild
- Relations: Cavendish family
- Children: 1 son, 2 daughters
- Education: Eton College

Richard Hugh Cavendish, Baron Cavendish of Furness FRSA DL (born 2 November 1941), is a British Conservative politician and aristocrat.

Lord Cavendish owns Holker Hall and its 17,000 acre estate overlooking Morecambe Bay in Cumbria. The property became part of this branch of the Cavendish family's inheritance via his grandfather, Lord Richard Cavendish CB.

== Early life ==
Richard Hugh Cavendish was born as the second child and first son of Richard Edward Osborne Cavendish (1917–1972) and his wife, Pamela Thomas (b. 1918), daughter of Hugh Lloyd Thomas (1888–1938) and Hon. Gwendoline Ada Bellew (1891–1976), a great-granddaughter of Patrick Bellew, 1st Baron Bellew.

== Biography ==
Educated at Eton College, he was created a life peer as Baron Cavendish of Furness, of Cartmel in the County of Cumbria, on the advice of Prime Minister Margaret Thatcher on 17 May 1990 and served as a lord-in-waiting (1990–92). He and his son, Hon. Freddy Cavendish, are in remainder to the dukedom of Devonshire.

Cavendish is the chairman of the Holker Estate Group and has chaired the Morecambe and Lonsdale Conservative Association (1975–78) and the board of governors of St Anne's School, Windermere (1983–89). He is a director of Nirex Ltd (since 1993) and served as High Sheriff of Cumbria (1978–79) and a member of the Cumbria County Council (1985–1990). He became president of the Dry Stone Walling Association of Great Britain in 2008. He is chairman of the Burlington Stone Company.

Cavendish is the president of South Cumbria Rivers Trust.

== Marriage ==
In 1970 Cavendish married Grania Mary Caulfeild (b. 1947), granddaughter of Sir William Lindsay Murphy, who served as British Governor of the Bahamas. They have one son, the Hon. Frederick Cavendish and two daughters, the Hon. Lucy Cavendish and the Hon. Emily Cavendish.

== Arms ==
Coat of arms of Hugh Cavendish, Baron Cavendish of Furness
Crest A serpent nowed Proper Escutcheon Sable, three bucks' heads cabossed argent Motto Cavendo tutus

== See also ==
- Cavendish family

Orders of precedence in the United Kingdom
Preceded by The Lord Stevens of Ludgate	Gentlemen; Baron Cavendish of Furness	Followed by The Lord Pearson of Rannoch
