= Cartmel Priory =

Parish church in Cumbria, England

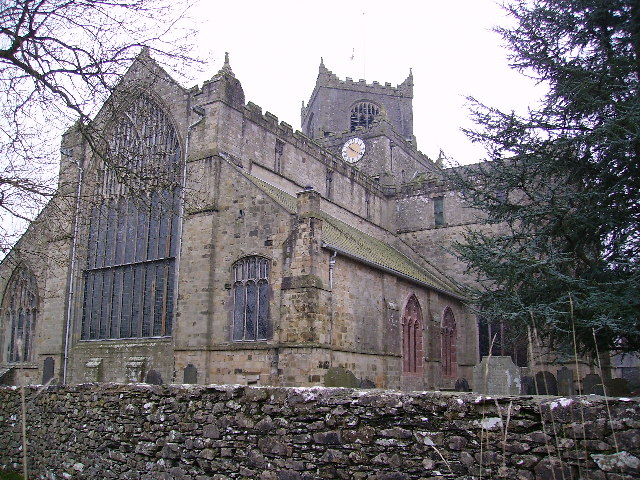
- Cartmel Priory Church

- Location in the former South Lakeland district Location in Cumbria

Monastery information
- Full name: Cartmel Priory
- Other names: St Mary the Virgin & St Michael
- Order: Augustinian
- Established: 1190
- Disestablished: 1536
- Diocese: Carlisle

People
- Founders: William Marshal, 1st Earl of Pembroke

Site
- Location: Cartmel, Cumbria, England
- Coordinates: 54°12′4″N 2°57′8″W
- Visible remains: Church still used as parish church, gatehouse nearby.
- Public access: Yes

Cartmel Priory is a former medieval Augustinian monastery in Cartmel, Cumbria, England (formerly in Lancashire). The priory's surviving church serves as the Anglican parish church of Cartmel.

== Priory ==
=== Foundation ===
The priory was founded in c. 1190 by William Marshal, created 1st Earl of Pembroke, for a community of the Augustinian Canons regular, and was dedicated to Saint Mary the Virgin and Saint Michael. It replaced a previous church of St Mary, so part of the priory church was used by the parish.

To support the new house, William granted it the whole fief of the district of Cartmel. It was first colonised by a prior and twelve canons sent from Bradenstoke Priory in Wiltshire. The church was begun on a grand scale, using fine sandstone ashlar from nearby Quarry Flat. It consisted of a chancel with a three-storey elevation similar to those used on great cathedrals and abbeys, two shorter chancel aisles with rib vaults, and two transepts meeting at a crossing more spacious than that at Carlisle Cathedral. All this work was done in an elaborate 'Transitional' style, combining Norman and Gothic features. The arches mix rounded and pointed forms, and are decorated with exuberant late Romanesque mouldings (especially variants of chevrons), while the column capitals have Gothic stiff-leaf. Unfortunately for the nascent priory, however, William Marshal died in 1219. This left the community very short of funds, with an expensive but half-built church. The building was made weathertight, but the intended nave was not constructed, only its side doors and eastern responds showing the intention.

=== 14th century ===
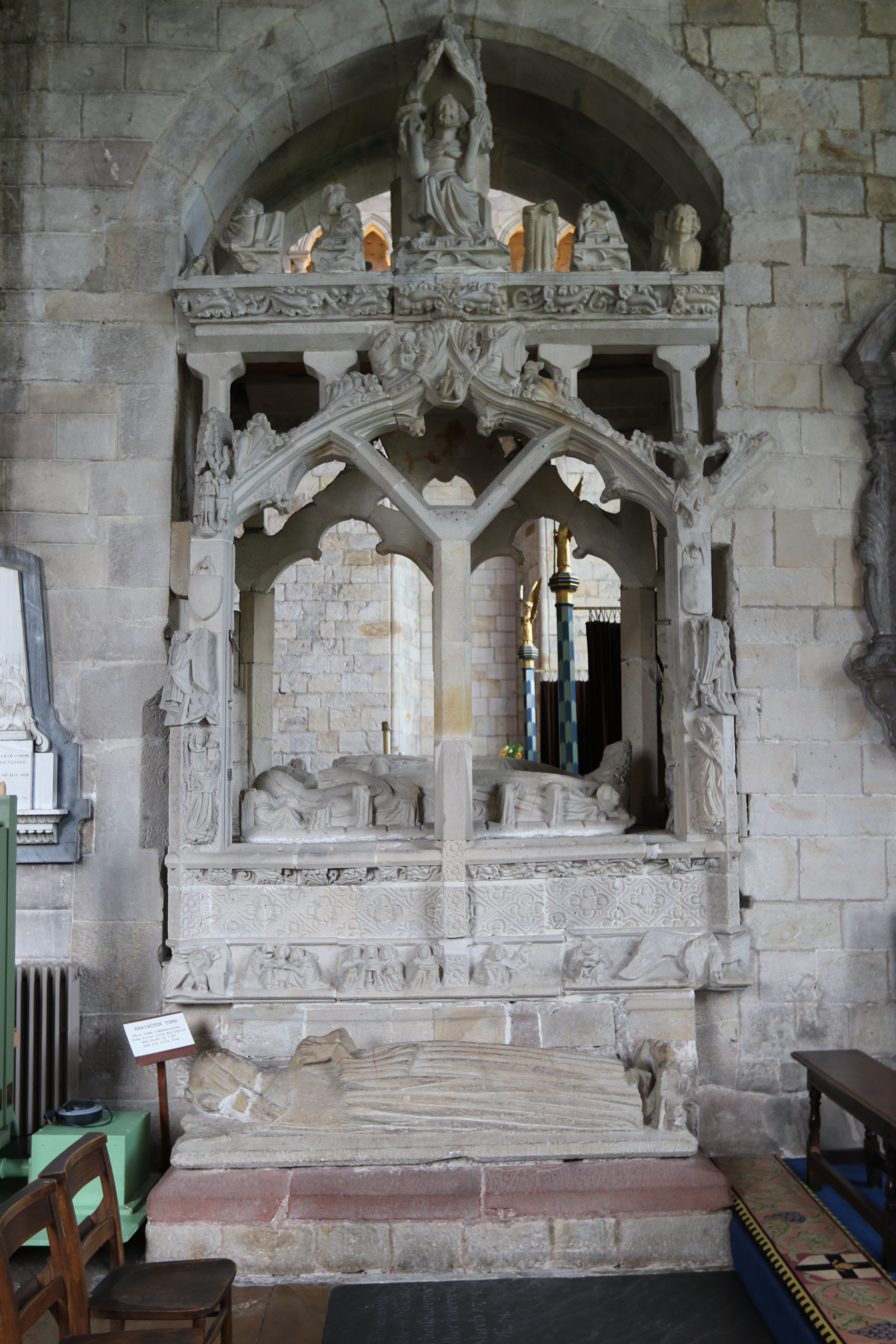
The Harrington Tomb

Between 1327 and 1347 the south choir aisle was rebuilt as a larger chapel with four traceried windows in the Decorated Gothic style by John Harington, 1st Baron Harington. This new chapel houses his tomb (within which his second wife, Joan de Dacre, is also interred), one of the finest monuments of its date. The stonework on the tomb contains the Harrington coat of arms with the Harrington knot as well as the Dacre coat of arms with the scallop shells. The gatehouse to the priory precinct, which apart from the church itself is the only surviving structure of the medieval priory, was built between 1330 and 1340, possibly in response to devastating Scottish raids.

=== Later Middle Ages ===
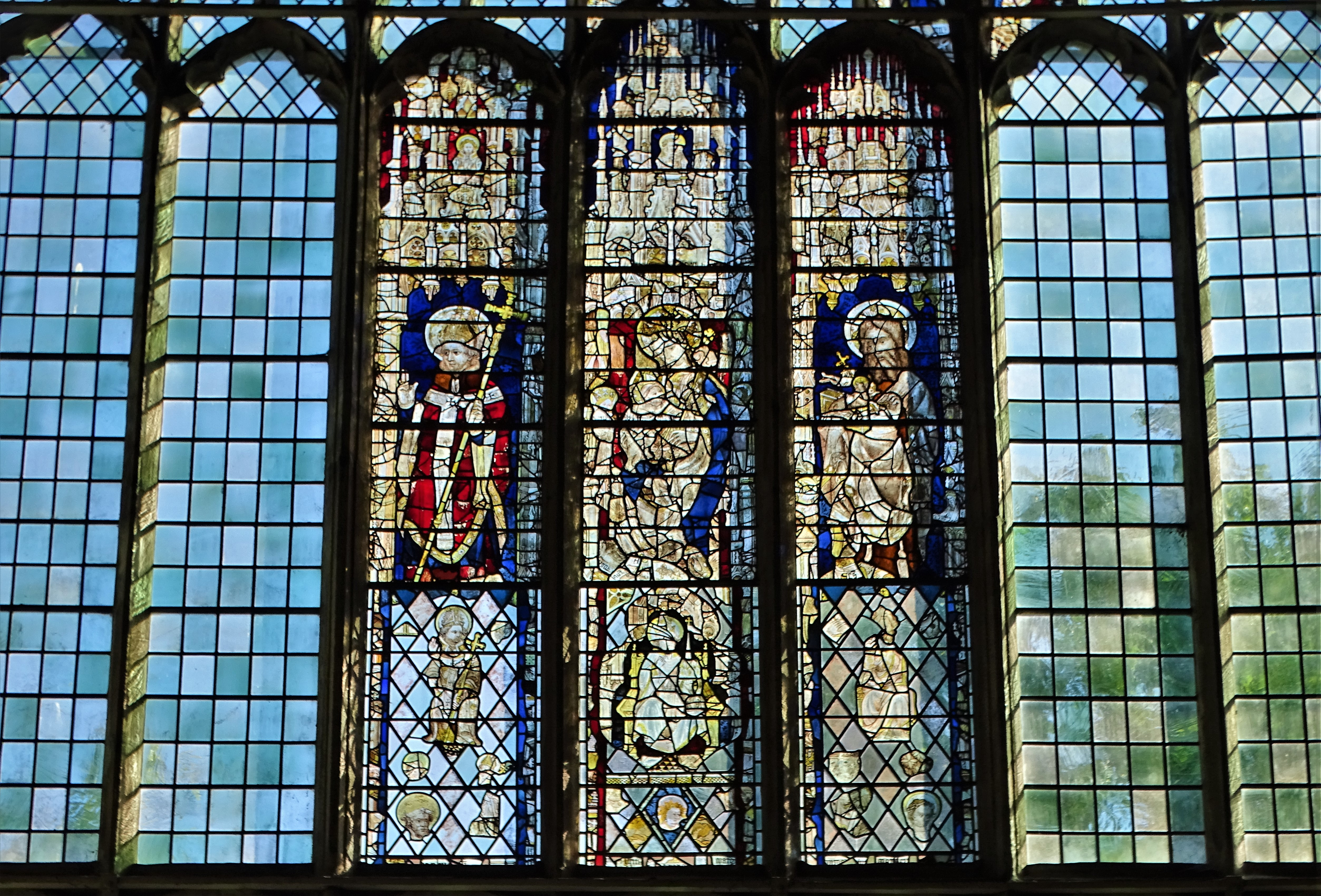
Surviving stained glass in the east window

In the 15th century extensive building work was undertaken, in part due to damage (believed to be from subsidence) to the monastic buildings round the cloister, to the south of the church The original cloister was demolished and a new one built to the north of the priory church. The nave was also built or rebuilt, in a much cruder manner than the original building, as the priory lacked a patron with the resources to match those of William Marshal. Its walls are slate rubble, contrasting with the original sandstone ashlar. In the east end of the church, the early lancet windows were replaced by one huge window of stained glass, misericords were installed in the choir, and the tower was raised. Unusually, the extension to the tower sits at a 45-degree angle to the base on which it rests, a feature believed to be unique in England.

The 25 misericords date from 1440, and are of an exceptional quality. They include a representation of the Green Man, which with its three heads sprouting foliage is said to symbolize the devil.

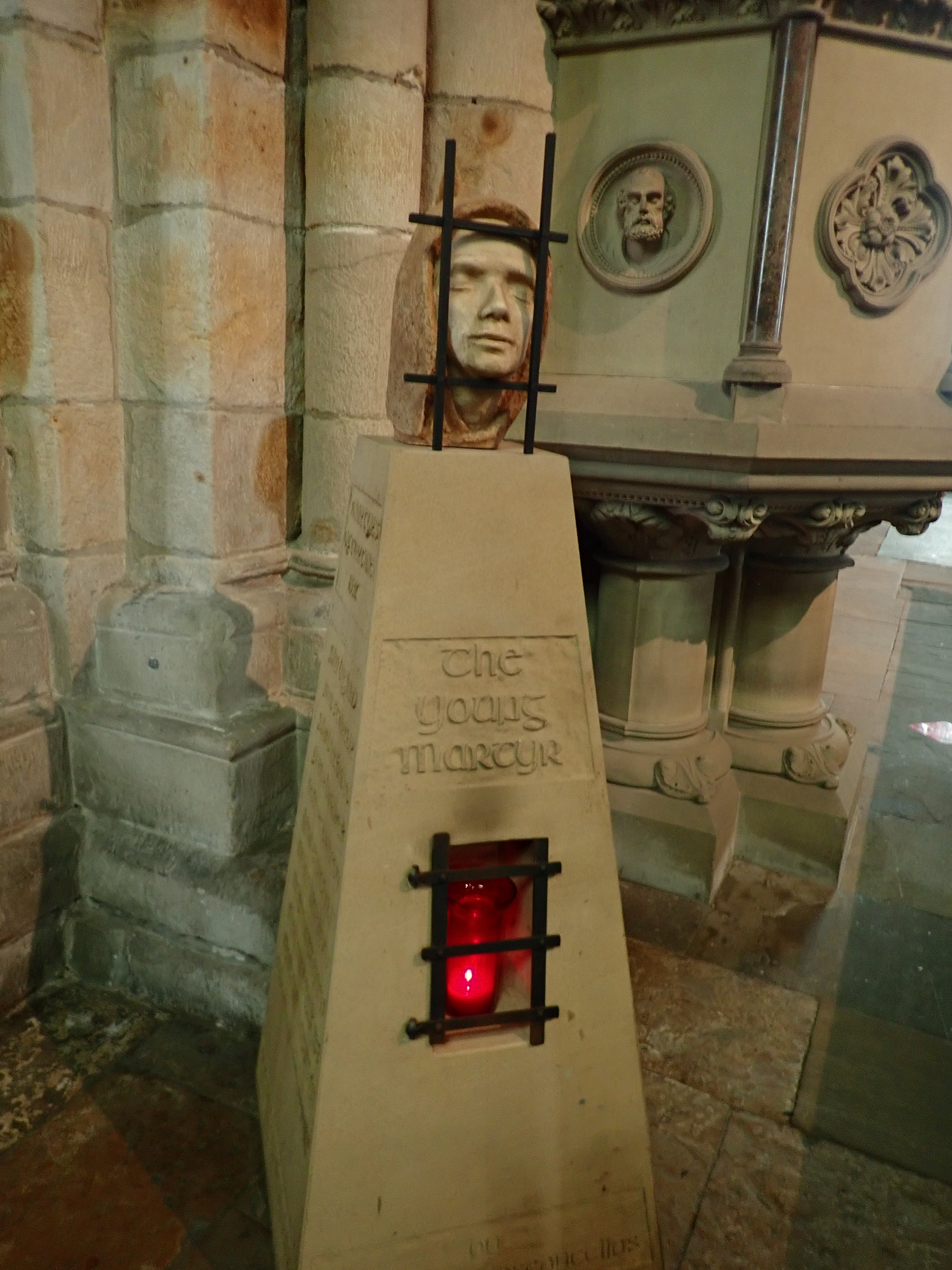
Sculpture commemorating the canons and parishioners hanged at the Dissolution, by Josefina de Vasconcellos

== Dissolution ==
The priory was surrendered by its then community of ten canons at the Dissolution of the Monasteries in 1536. During the Pilgrimage of Grace rebellion, the community was reinstated, one of perhaps 16 such cases. The prior, Richard Preston, did not support the rising, but fled to the Crown forces under Edward Stanley, 3rd Earl of Derby. He was to secure a parochial living to supplement his Crown pension. Others had a different fate. With the failure of the rising, as in other similar cases there came a brutal end for some, the subprior and several of the canons being hanged, along with ten villagers who had supported them.

The priory's ancient responsibility for providing a Guide over Cartmel Sands was transferred to the Duchy of Lancaster. Thomas Hogeson was appointed by the Duchy as the first official guide to the sands on 29 January 1548.

== Parish Church ==
The Dissolution commissioners had instructions to "pull down to the ground all the walls of the churches, stepulls, cloysters, fraterys, dorters, chapter howsys" and all the rest. The materials were then to be sold for the profit of the Crown. These habitual procedures would have meant Cartmel Priory's church being demolished along with the rest of its buildings. However, in this case the founder William Marshal had given an altar within the church to the village, and provided a priest along with it. The villagers petitioned to be allowed to keep the church as it was their only place of worship, and this was granted.

=== 17th century ===
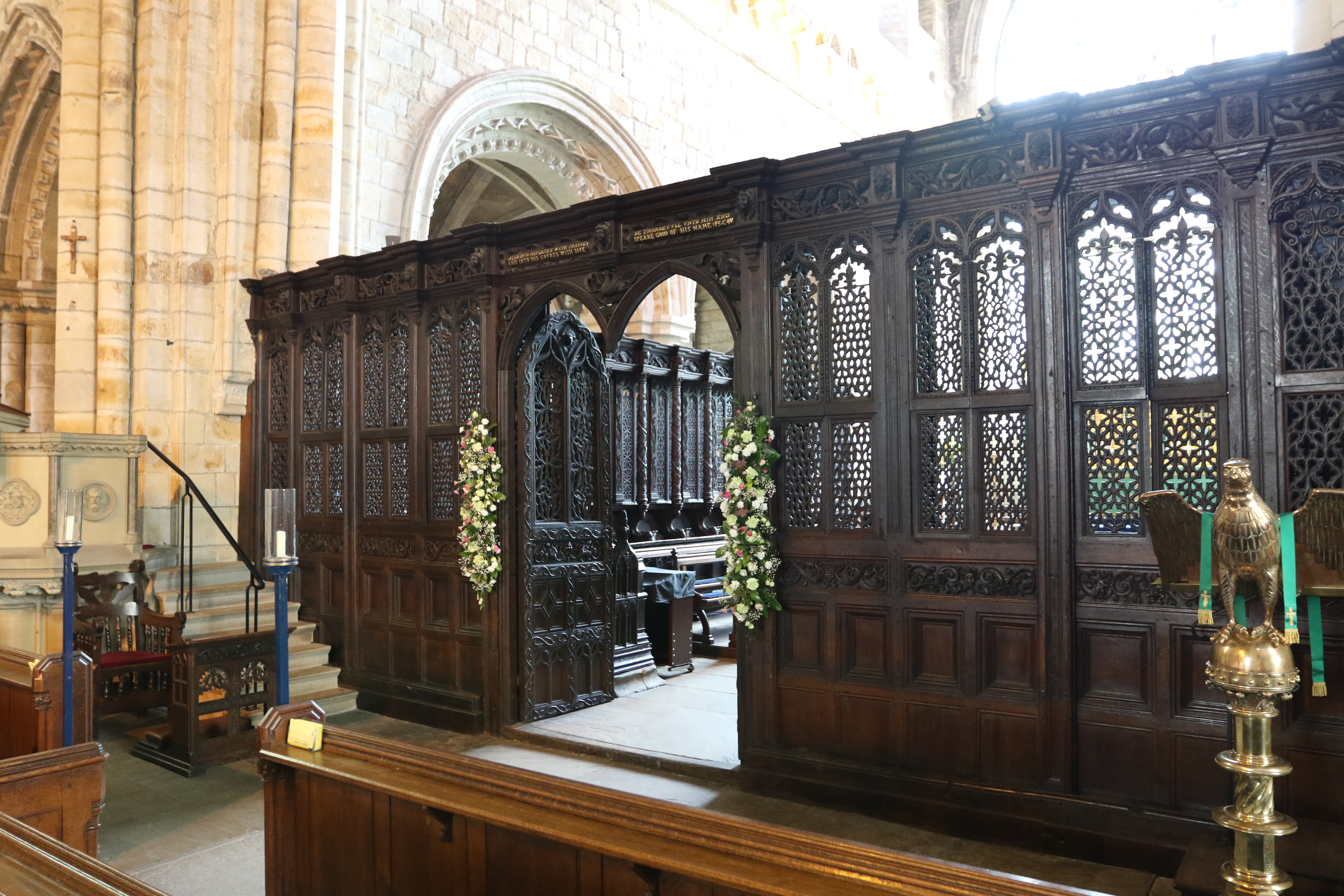
George Preston's chancel screen

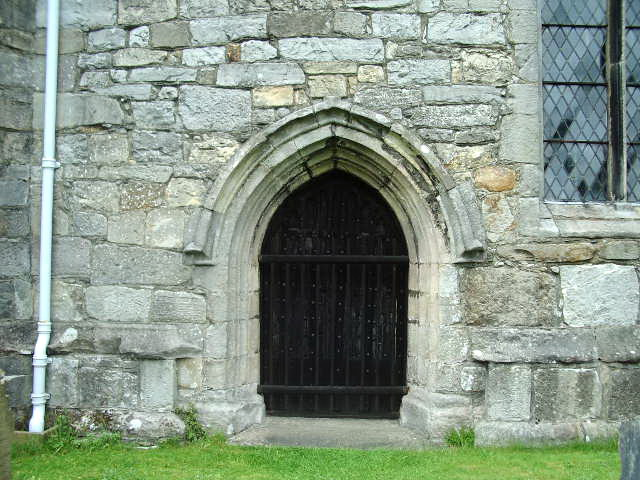
The bullet-ridden south-west door, now (incorrectly) known as the "Cromwell Door"

Despite the villagers' being allowed to keep the church, the lead was stripped from the nave roof, and until 1618 when George Preston, a landowner at nearby Holker Hall, provided considerable finances to allow the roof to be reinstated, the villagers actually worshipped in the choir, rather than the nave of the church. George Preston also provided decorated plaster ceilings (since removed) and the elaborate timber screens round the chancel, which combine Classical features with Flamboyant Gothic tracery and were possibly made by Flemish carvers. In 1643, during the English Civil War, some Parliamentarian troops stayed in the village, stabling their horses in the church. Bullet holes from this time are still visible in the southwest door of the nave. The troops also destroyed a pair of organs which had been provided by George Preston, and probably broke up the Harrington tomb. This was later crudely reconstructed and inserted in the chancel wall, damaging the sedilia and displacing a medieval effigy of a canon, which now lies on the Town Choir floor.

The nave was used after the Dissolution as a prison and later between 1624 and 1790 as a grammar school.

=== 19th and 20th centuries ===
By 1830 the church was in need of repair again, and underwent a restoration, which has been described in the Edge Guide as "more enthusiastic than sympathetic". In 1850 a new panelled ceiling was inserted in the central part of the church, forming the belfry floor.

A further restoration was carried out in 1867 by E. G. Paley. The restoration was described in the Westmorland Gazette of 28 September 1867

The old seats and galleries have been removed from the nave and transepts, which have been reseated with new benches of oak. The plaster and whitewash of succeeding centuries has been entirely taken off and cleaned from the walls, pillars, and arches of the church. The ancient massive open timbered roof of oak, which for centuries has been hid behind a plastered ceiling, has been uncovered and restored. The whole of the windows have been reglazed with Hartley’s cathedral glass. A new font, pulpit and reading-desk of stone have been added to the church. The font is square with moulded panels, carved and drapered work, and marble shaft. The pulpit is of octagonal design, supported by marble shafts, on three sides are moulded panels containing carved heads representing our Saviour, St. Peter, and St. Paul. A new organ has been erected in the town choir.

In 1923, the gatehouse became a museum, and was used for exhibitions, and meetings, before being presented in 1946 to the National Trust.

The church is an active Anglican parish church in the deanery of Windermere, the archdeaconry of Westmorland and Furness, and the diocese of Carlisle. Its benefice is united with those of St Mary, Allithwaite, St Peter, Field Broughton, St John the Baptist, Flookburgh, St Paul, Grange-over-Sands, Grange Fell Church, Grange-Over-Sands, and St Paul, Lindale, to form the benefice of Cartmel Peninsula. The church is recorded in the National Heritage List for England as a designated Grade I listed building. The church houses several modern sculptures by Josefina de Vasconcellos, including They Fled by Night (of the Flight into Egypt), The Young Martyr (commemorating the 'Cartmel martyrs' of the Dissolution) and St Michael slaying the dragon.

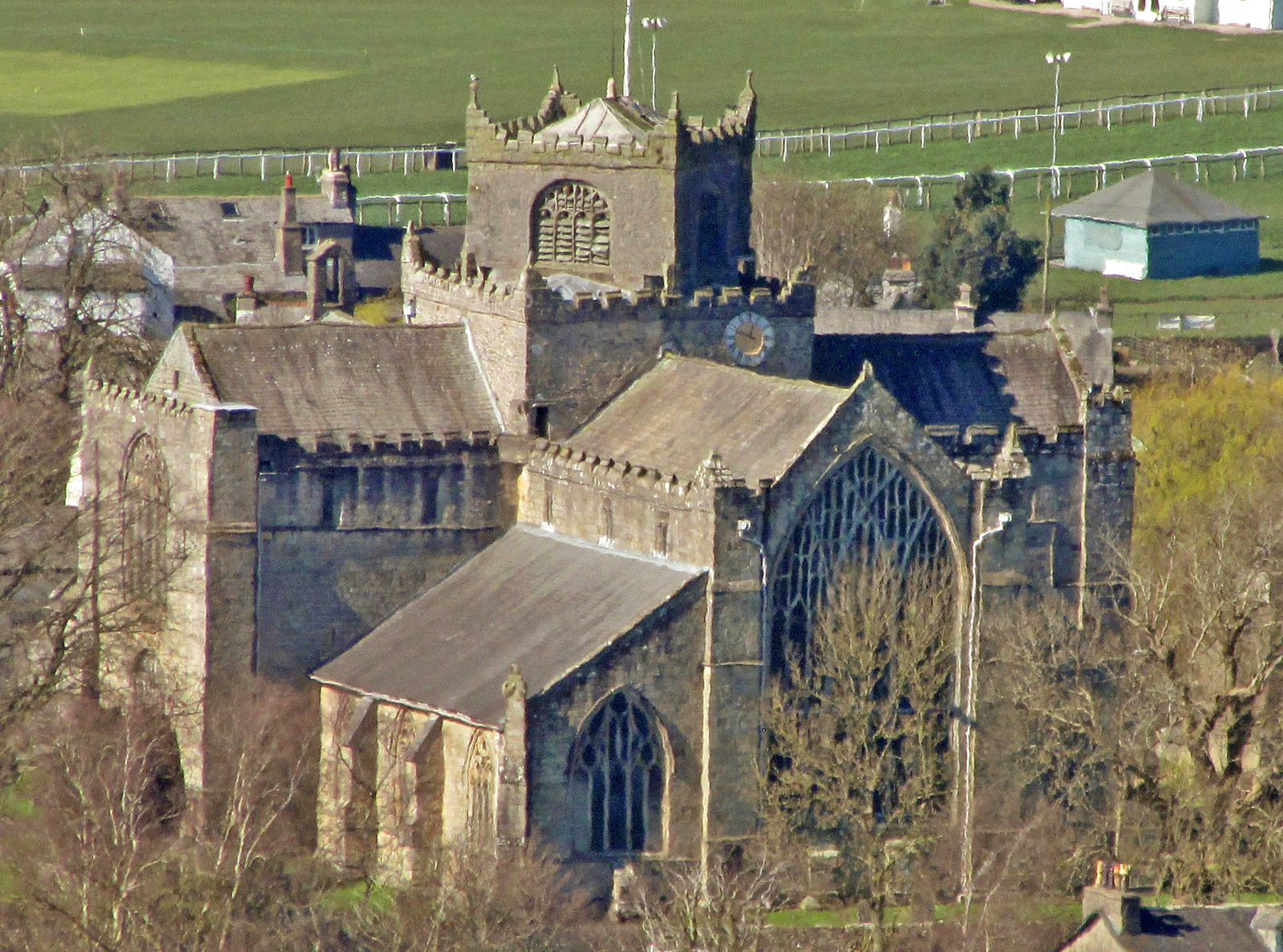
Priory exterior from the east

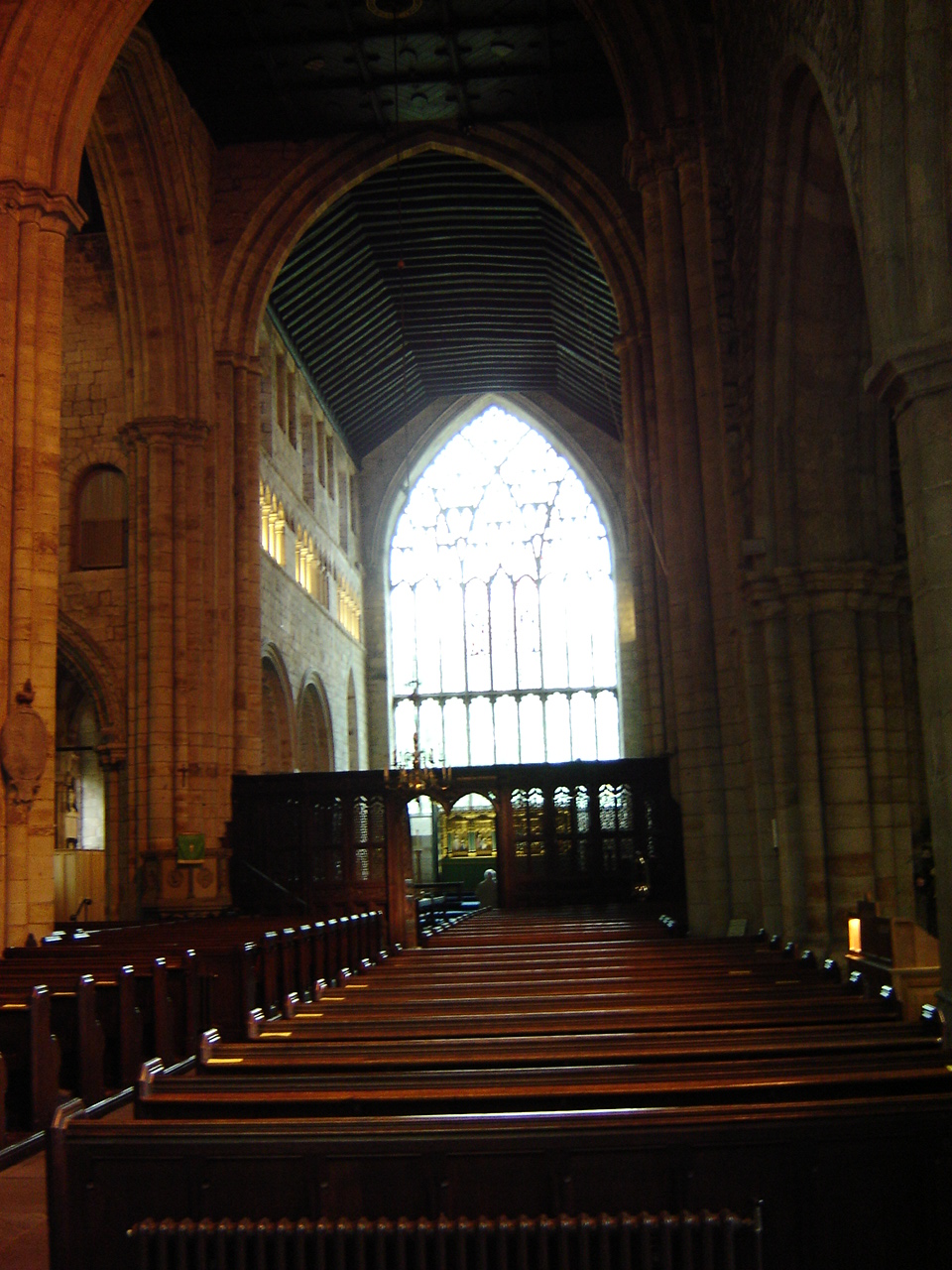
Interior looking east

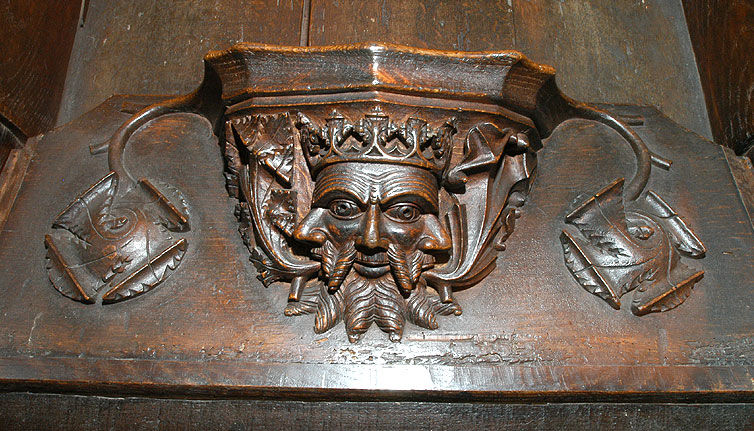
The "Green Man" misericord in the Choir

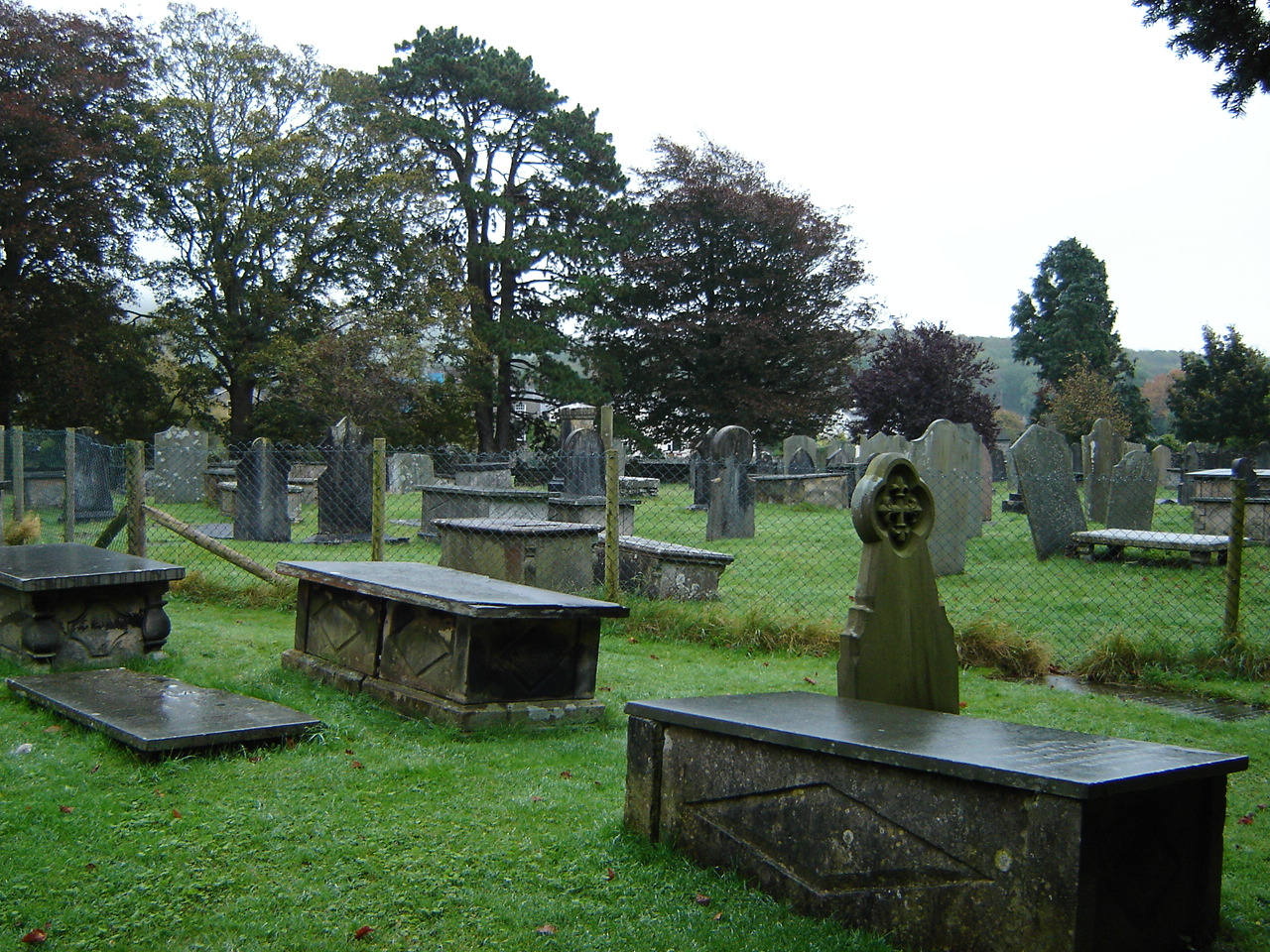
The churchyard

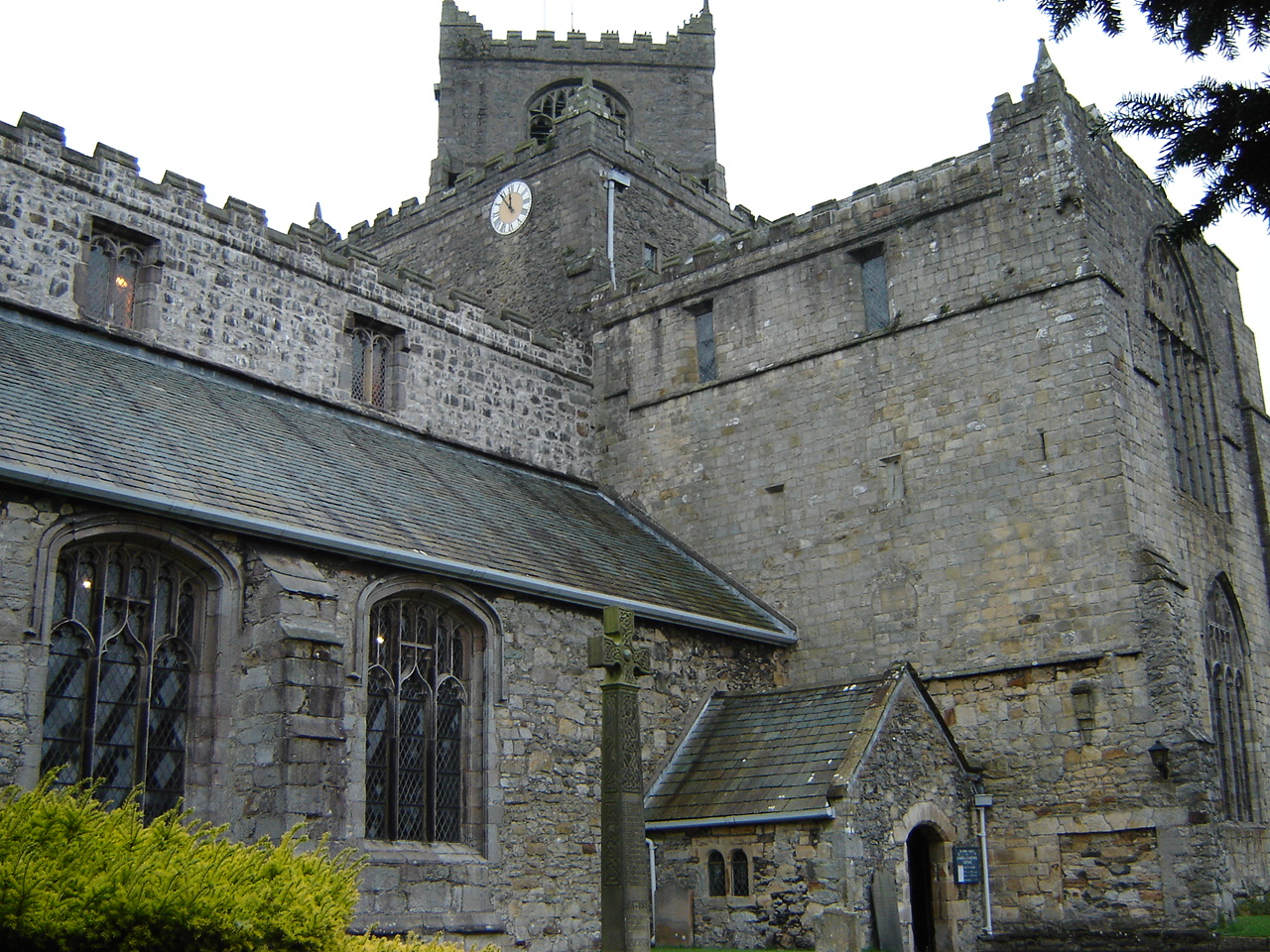
Exterior from the south-west

=== Organ ===
The pipe organ was installed in 1867 by F. Jardine of Manchester. The inauguration was recorded in the Westmorland Gazette of 28 September 1867:

The organ which has been built by Mr. Jardine of Manchester, had its capabilities tested by Mr. Stevens of Holy Trinity Church, Manchester. It had been intended where the rubric leaves it optional, whether any part shall be "said or sung" to have our beautiful church service sung by one of the finest choirs of Manchester, and the organ presided at by one of the most accomplished amateur players in the North of England. Arrangements having been made by Mr. Jardine for the attendance of Mr. Joule and his choir of St. Peter’s; but the Bishop has so strong an objection to musical services, and such strong fears of its effects on worshippers, that out of deference to his opinion the people of Cartmel were deprived of what would certainly have been, and what they had long been anticipating as a good treat.

The organ was rebuilt in 1969 by Rushworth and Dreaper of Liverpool and in 2005 by Principal Pipe Organs. A specification of the organ can be found on the National Pipe Organ Register.

=== Bells ===
The church tower contains a ring of 6 bells. Four are new, dating from 1987 by Eijsbouts, with an old set of 4 bells (2 from 1661 and then 1726 and 1729) making an old 6 when combined with the 2 smaller bells of 1932 by John Taylor and Co.

== Burials in the priory ==
- John Harington, 1st Baron Harington
- John Harington, 2nd Baron Harington

== See also ==
- Grade I listed churches in Cumbria
- Listed buildings in Lower Allithwaite
- List of ecclesiastical works by E. G. Paley
- List of ecclesiastical works by Paley and Austin
- List of English abbeys, priories and friaries serving as parish churches
