= Willson Group =

English family of painters

- Years active: 1860–1906
- Location: England
- Major figures: John Joseph Willson; Emilie Dorothy Hilliard Willson; Michael Anthony Hilliard Willson; Margaret Willson; Emilie Dorothy Willson; Mary A. Hilliard Willson
- Influences: English art
- Influenced: Instrumental to the foundation of Leeds Art Gallery

The Willson Group of artists (active c. 1860–1906) was an English Quaker family of about seven landscape, portrait and caricature painters. Members included John Joseph Willson, his sister Hannah Willson, his wife Emilie Dorothy Hilliard, and their four children, Michael Anthony Hilliard Willson, twins Margaret Willson and E. Dorothy Willson, and Mary Hilliard Willson.

John Joseph, known as J.J. Willson, was senior partner in the firm of Wilson, Walker & Co. which owned the Sheepscar tannery, at one time the largest in the country. He was instrumental to the movement for the foundation of Leeds Art Gallery, working on a committee alongside John Atkinson Grimshaw and others, and he was a vice president of the Yorkshire Union of Artists when John William Waterhouse was president.

J.J., Margaret and Dorothy exhibited at the Royal Academy Summer Exhibition; on five occasions in Margaret's case. Michael and Mary achieved commissions including caricatures of prominent Leeds public figures such as Sir James Kitson and John Barran MP, and portraits in oils of Isaac and Ann Rickett and George Corson. The children and sister of J.J. never married.

== Group setup and background ==
=== Family origins ===
The Wilson (later, Willson) family owned High Wray House, at High Wray, Claife, Ambleside, now a listed building. It was built in 1728 by Anthony Wilson and his wife Dorothy. In the early 1840s the family funded a schoolhouse in the grounds of High Wray House; the original schoolhouse was demolished, and the replacement school building later became High Wray Village Hall.

=== Wilson, Walker & Co. ===
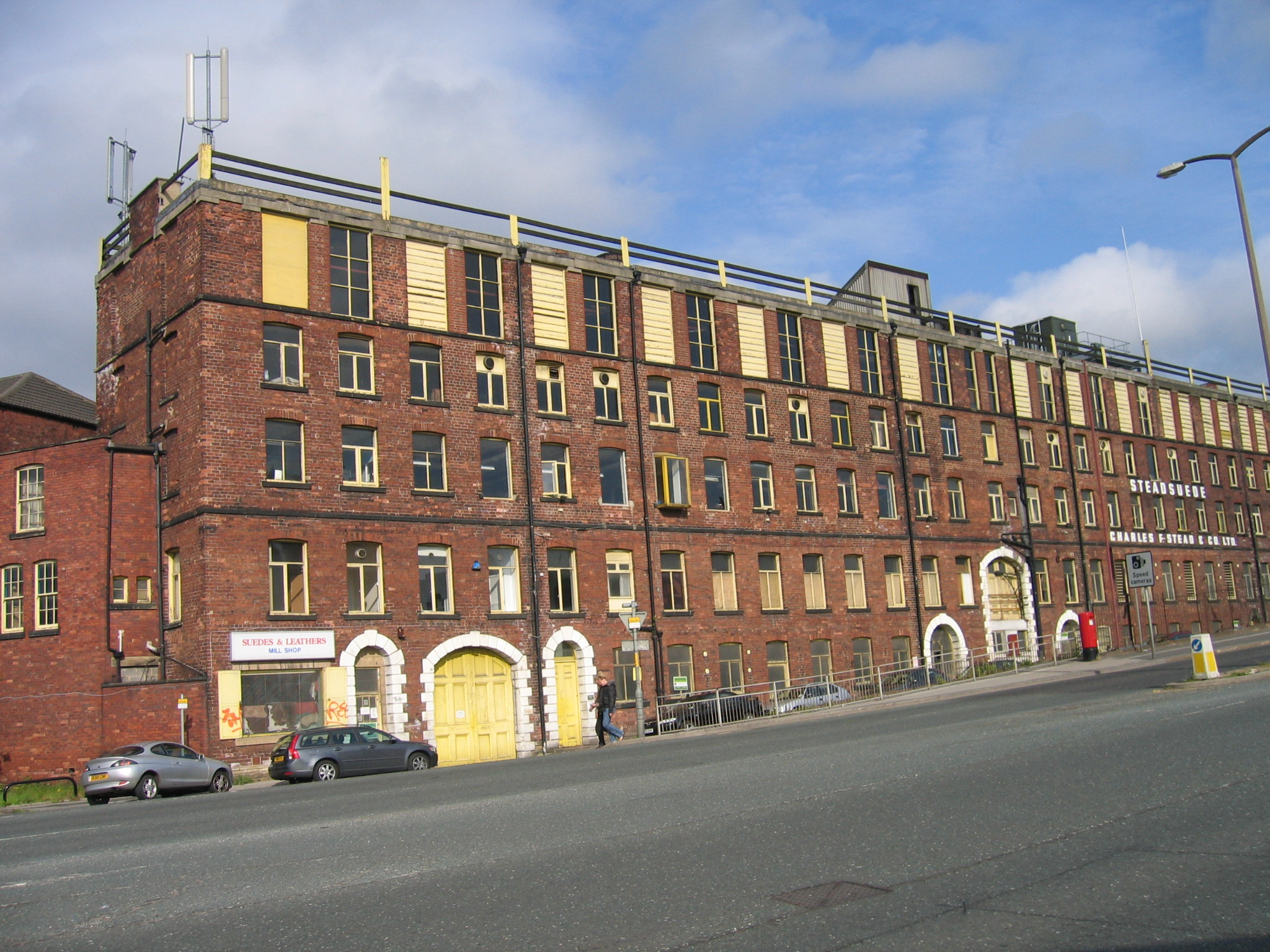
Former Wilson, Walker & Co. building, Sheepscar

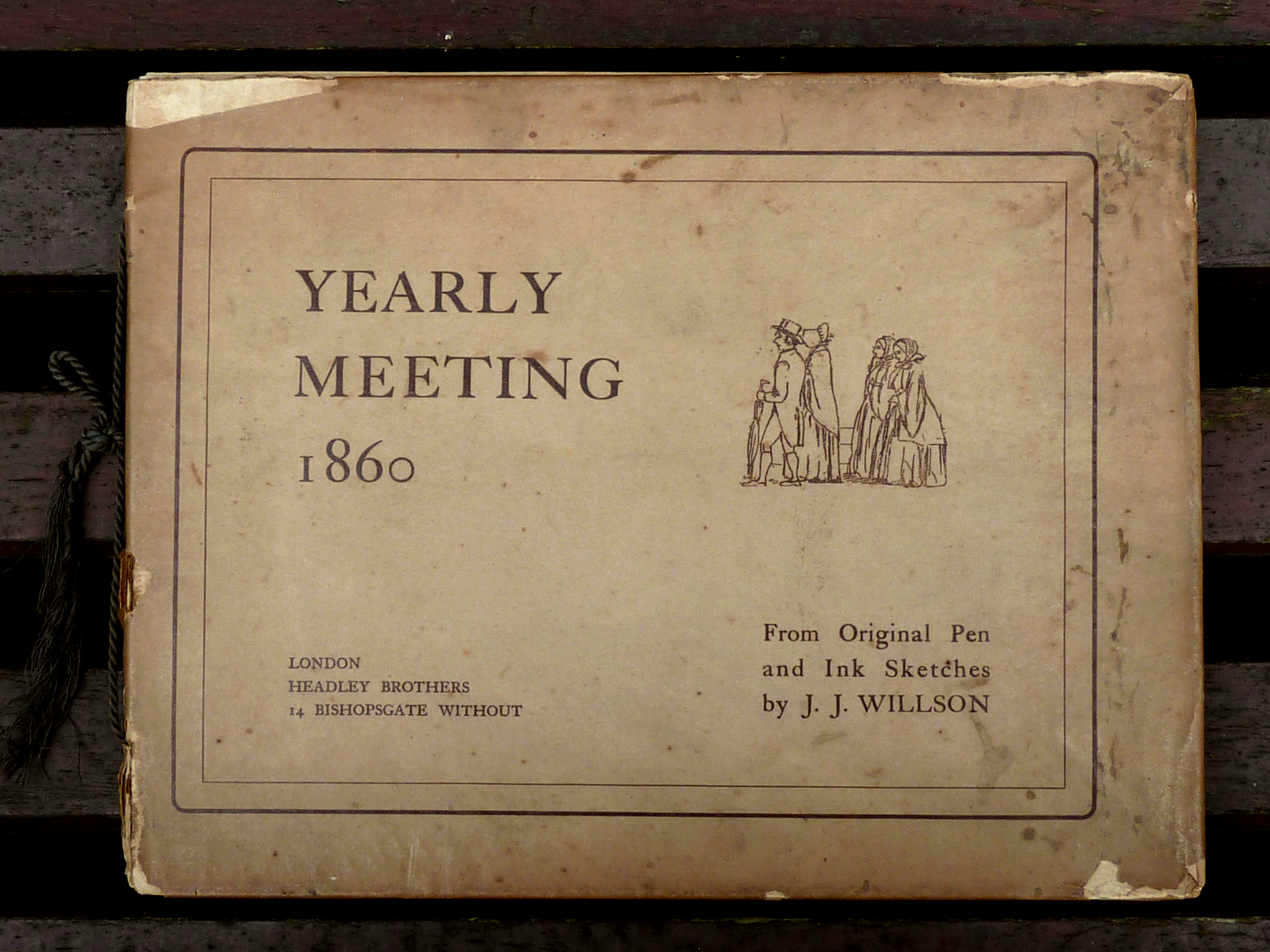
J.J. Willson's book: note byline spelling

The Willson Group changed the spelling of its family name from "Wilson" to "Willson". It consisted of a set of close relatives whose work was funded by their family firm Wilson, Walker & Co. in Leeds, due to the financial success of John Wilson Senior, JP, (b. Claife or Hawkshead c. 1801) who lived at Old Hall, (Note: Old Hall in 1861 may have been Elmete Hall before it was rebuilt in 1865) Barwick-in-Elmet and Roundhay, Leeds, in 1861, and 1 West Hill, Potternewton, Headingley in 1871. His wife was Margaret (b. Kendal c. 1792). John Wilson (sic) was mayor of Leeds between 9 November 1853 and 9 November 1854.

John senior established the family tannery business of Wilson, Walker & Co. Ltd. in 1823; it moved to Sheepscar Street, Sheepscar, in 1847. The firm manufactured Spanish leather and leather glue, and made leather artefacts too, for example a leather dressing case, possibly made for the Great Exhibition of 1851. By 1893 it had become the largest tannery in the country. It collapsed in 1901, however it is reasonable to suppose that it was the income from J.J. Willson's senior directorship of this firm which permitted his family's dedication to art until around 1900. The factory was purchased in 1904 by Charles F. Stead & Co., a company which as of 2019 still produced leather goods there.

=== Studio locations ===
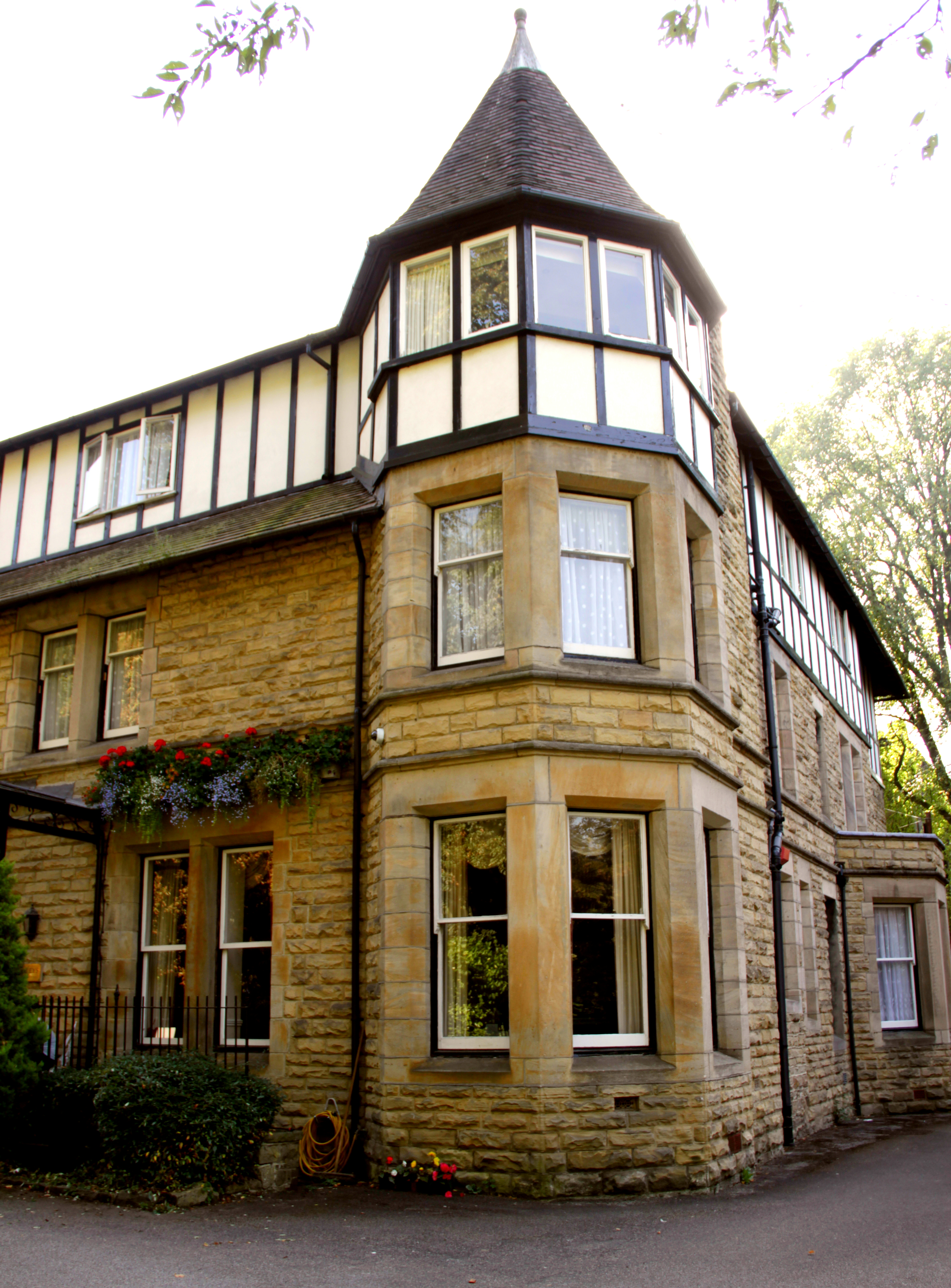
Ballamona, where the Willson Group lived and worked c. 1897 to at least 1902

All members of this group worked from home. The Willson Group consisted of J.J. Willson's household: himself, his wife, his son and three daughters, and J.J.'s unmarried sister Hannah. (Note: The spelling of the family surnames varies through time. From the 18th century to the mid 19th century, the names are most often written by clerks as "Wilson" and "Hilyard." By the end of the 19th century, most sources have the names as "Willson" and "Hilliard," and family members are signing their names in that way.) They lived together in various locations in the Leeds area. From c. 1863 to 1871 they were living in Newton Grove, Chapeltown Road, Headingley, Potternewton. From at least 1888 to 1891 they lived with a number of servants at 2 Moorland Terrace, off Reservoir Road in the Lawnswood area of Leeds. From at least 1897 to 1902 the family were at a house called Ballamona, Otley Road, Headingley, Leeds; it was rented from architect George Corson. (Note: Ballamona is in Shire Oak Road, off Otley Road, Headingley, Leeds. It was built by architect George Corson as a pair of semi-detached villas. Ballamona was the right-hand house. George Corson lived there at one time. In the 1950s the two houses were joined into one, and as of 2019 it is a hotel called Haley's. The building is unlisted.) By 1906 until at least 1911 the four children, still unmarried, were living at 5 Moorland Road, Leeds with their aunt Hannah Willson.

Media related to Ballamona, Shire Oak Road, Headingley at Wikimedia Commons

== Hannah Willson ==
Hannah Willson (Leeds c. 1829 – Leeds 7 July 1918) was an artist, "living on her own means," from "income from dividends." She was the unmarried sister of J.J. and the aunt of Michael, Margaret, Emilie and Mary Willson. She lived in the hamlet of High Wray, Claife, Cumberland until some time before 1890, when she moved to Leeds to live with her brother's family. Hannah died aged 89 years on 7 July 1918 at the Victoria Home, Kirkstall Lane, Leeds, of chronic nephritis.

=== Exhibitions ===
- Small Cottage at Bewdley (11 February 1890), "an excellent little picture," Leeds Fine Arts Club's conversazione at the Philosophical Hall, Leeds.

== John Joseph Willson ==
John Joseph Willson (Leeds c. 1837 – High Wray 15 November 1903), known as J.J., was the only son of John Willson Senior. Like his father he was a Quaker. He inherited his father's leather business, becoming its senior partner. He was also an amateur artist, "quite a brilliant painter in watercolours," specialising in sporting and landscape subjects. Artists Edwin Moore and Richard Waller gave him some lessons, but he was mainly self-taught. He exhibited at the Royal Academy of Arts and the Walker Art Gallery, and in 1896 he became a vice-president of the Yorkshire Union of Artists, with John William Waterhouse R.A. as president. He was "one of the judges selected for adjudication of prizes at the Leeds School of Art, as well as that at York." He also donated prizes for art to the Yorkshire Union of Mechancs' Institutes in 1889. He was a longstanding member of Leeds Philosophical Society council, and one of the governors of Yorkshire College. Although he declined public work during his final six years, he "painted up to the last." Ultimately the family firm failed, J.J. fell ill with dropsy and "graver symptoms," and died at his sister's house at High Wray, Ambleside on 15 November 1903, aged 67 years. The cause of death was recorded as fibroid degeneration of the heart, and dropsy. The gross value of his estate was £6,240, and his Will was proved at Wakefield on 31 December 1903.

=== Leeds Fine Art Society Executive Committee ===
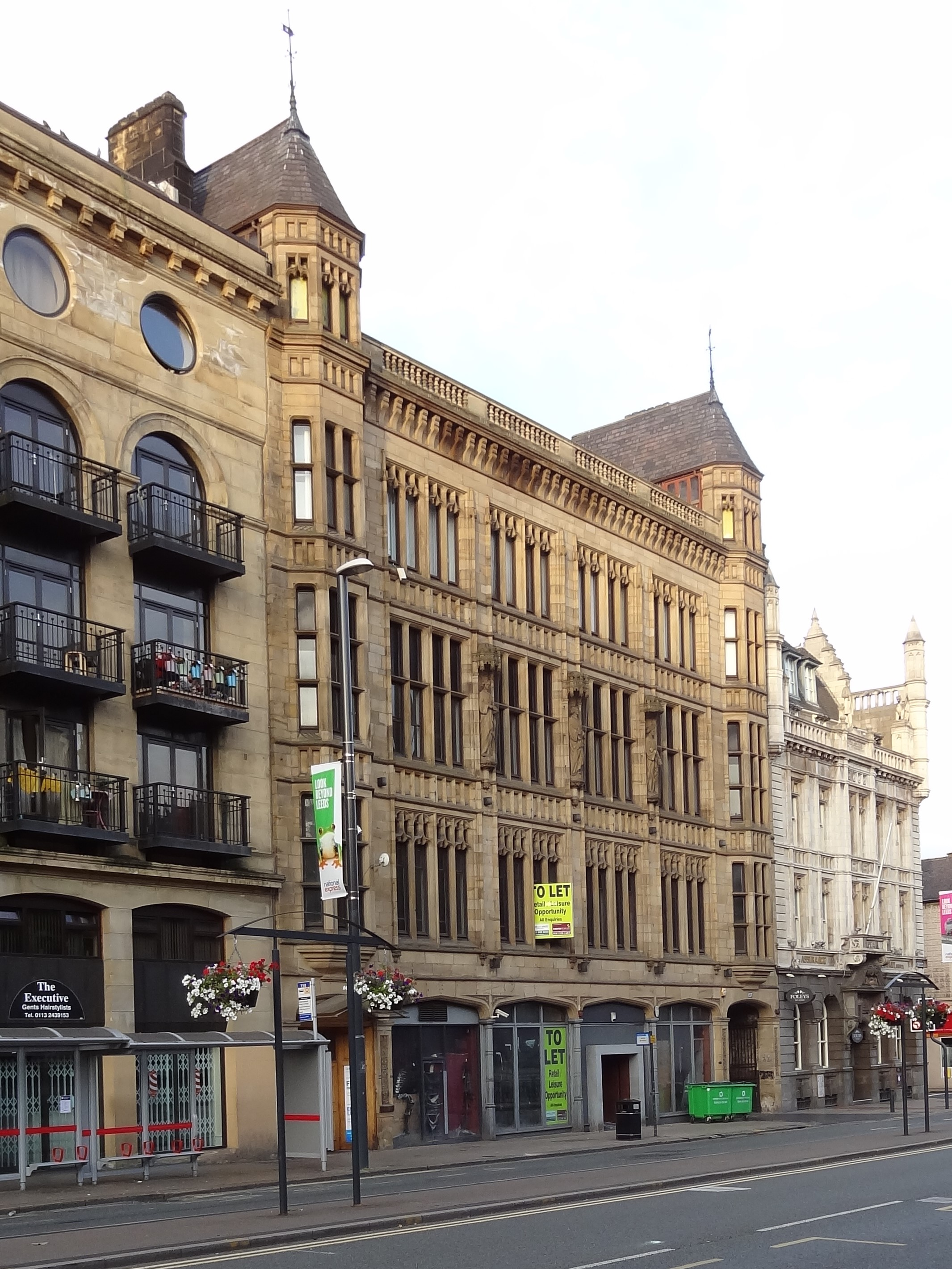
Athenaeum Building, location of Yorkshire Fine Art Exhibitions from 1880

John Joseph was the "originator of the modern picture exhibitions in [Leeds]." He was one of the founding members, and for 27 years the president, of the Leeds Fine Art Society (LFAS), and honorary secretary of the Yorkshire Fine Art Exhibition (YFAE). Following his death his activity in the LAFS, and Executive Committee in particular, was highlighted by the Yorkshire Post and Leeds Intelligencer:

As president of the Leeds Fine Arts Club, John Joseph Willson's artistic and social qualities were seen to the fullest advantage. It is a small society which makes no pretense to an artistic mission, but does something for the mutual encouragement of its members not only to practise, but still more to appreciate, art. How much it owes to its first and only president it will realise ... he was, by the example of his work and by his cheery enthusiasm, the life and soul of the little body.

The LFAS was an organisation which in 1876 formed an Executive Committee, including Hon. Sec. J.J. Willson, dedicated to raising funds for, and founding, the building of a permanent public fine art gallery. Although the committee members changed over time, and the building and funding process was ultimately taken over by Leeds Town Hall, it can be said that the original committee initiated the movement to found the gallery, and arranged much of the early funding by subscription. Several of the original committee members, including J.J. Willson, took part in the process to the last. The committee first met at the Mechanics' Institute. The original committee membership included the Marquis of Ripon as president, Rev. John Gott (vicar of Leeds, and son of Benjamin Gott) John Atkinson Grimshaw, several Leeds aldermen from Leeds Town Hall, and architect William Henry Thorp (1852–1944) who would ultimately design its planned Municipal Art Gallery in 1886–1888.

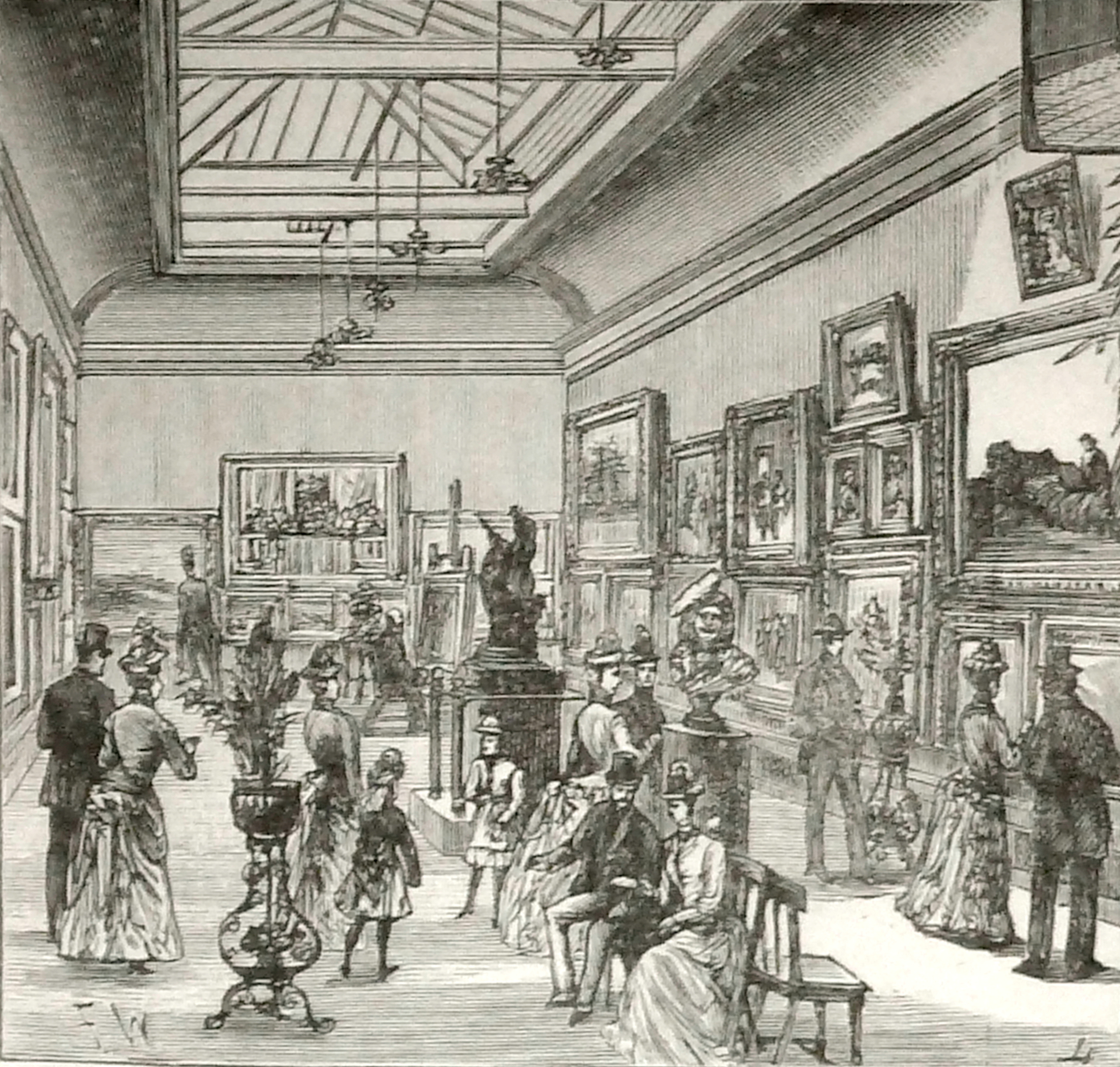
North Room of Leeds Art Gallery, 1888

By 1879 J.W. Davis was Hon. Sec. and the committee was meeting at the Mayor's rooms in Leeds Town Hall. The committee, which had always included Town Hall representatives, had grown to include more town councillors, J.J. Willson, and various artists. At this point the committee had estimated the final cost at £10,000, had raised £2,000 by subscription; of the remainder one third was "guaranteed in Leeds," and the rest "guaranteed at Huddersfield and Halifax." By 1880, one of the secretaries of the committee, J.W. Davis, was saying, "We may hope that our success ... may ultimately ultimately encourage the authorities of the town to take the matter in hand, and add another institution of beneficence and culture to those already existing in Leeds, in the shape of a permanent and public fine art gallery." By 1888, Leeds Town Hall had indeed taken the matter in hand, taken much of the credit for the idea, and arranged funds to complete the cost of building, and for maintenance of the gallery. The Marquis of Ripon and Thorp, who were on the original committee, were present at the opening of the gallery in 1888.

Meanwhile, from 1880 the YFAE held a five-year lease for exhibitions in the Athenaeum Building, Park Lane (now The Headrow), Leeds. J.J. contributed works to the YFAE's first Spring Exhibition in 1880, alongside work by Thomas Sidney Cooper, John Atkinson Grimshaw, Edwin Landseer, Lawrence Alma-Tadema, William Calder Marshall, and others. J.J. used his position to promote the idea of a new "good gallery" for Leeds. He said that, "ever since he had been able to distinguish between a tea tray and an all-right picture, he had been desirous of seeing his native town in possession of a good gallery" for the display of the Committee's existing collection, and for the promotion and sale of the work of local artists, because "artists must live."

=== Amateur dramatics ===
At one time, John Joseph was involved with amateur dramatics. For example, on 27 and 28 February 1889, in support of a charity, he took part in The Parvenu by G.W. Godfrey, and Chalk and Cheese by Eille Norwood at the Assembly Rooms in Briggate, Leeds. Of his part in The Parvenu, the York Herald said, "Mr J.J. Willson gave a capital rendering of the part of the impecunious baronet Sir Fulke Pettigrew, acting with care and discretion." J.J. "was capital as Marmaduke Vavasour" in New Men and Old Acres in a charity performance with a Leeds amateur troupe at the Albert Hall, Cookridge Street, Leeds, on Friday 12 December 1890.

=== Exhibitions ===
- Autumn tints in Lundoleu, Norway (1880), "The absence of ... breadth is apparent in Autumn tints in Lundoleu, Norway ... where the excellent work in the grey and purple stones which break the foreground and in the distant mountains is not supported by the treatment of the trees in the middle distance," Yorkshire Art Exhibition.
- Anxious Moments (1880), "a stormy effect is realised by considerable power," Yorkshire Art Exhibition.
- The Breezy Expanse of Adel Moor (1885), "most important and gratifying," Yorkshire Artists' Exhibition.
- Unknown work (1886), Yorkshire Artists' Exhibition.
- A Study of Gossamer (11 February 1890), conversazione at the Philosophical Hall, Park Row, Leeds. Exhibited as president of Leeds Fine Arts Club. "A Study of Gossamer, painted many years ago, at Lochgoilhead, in Scotland, and illustrating the line, A misty morn, with fairy wreaths bedecked. (Note: The literary source of this line has not been found.) The subject is very well treated. A little rift in the mist, which is clearing off, shows the loch beyond; and the atmospheric effects, and the treatment of the tangled vegetation in the foreground, exhibit considerable skill. Mr Willson showed several other pictures, which possess much merit, and among which may be mentioned, Ballinahinch, A Welcome Pool, Coming Snow, and A Favourite Cast."
- Ballinahinch (11 February 1890), conversazione at the Philosophical Hall, Park Row, Leeds. Exhibited as president of Leeds Fine Arts Club.
- A Welcome Pool (11 February 1890), conversazione at the Philosophical Hall, Park Row, Leeds. Exhibited as president of Leeds Fine Arts Club.
- Coming Snow (11 February 1890), conversazione at the Philosophical Hall, Park Row, Leeds. Exhibited as president of Leeds Fine Arts Club.
- A Favourite Cast (11 February 1890), conversazione at the Philosophical Hall, Park Row, Leeds. Exhibited as president of Leeds Fine Arts Club.
- Home in the Gloaming (early March 1899), "one of the strongest drawings Mr J.J. Willson has ever shown. It is simple, broad, unforced, and, in the sky especially, is of fine quality," Leeds Public Gallery.
- The Windmill (early March 1899), "there is [a] welcome feeling for bigness of style ... but it is ... laboured."Leeds Public Gallery.
- The Last Gleam, 1191 (1900), watercolour, Royal Academy Summer Exhibition.

=== Works ===
- Set of pen and ink sketches of the Society of Friends annual meeting at Devonshire House, London (1860), bound as booklet.
- The Pot Hawker (1878), watercolour over graphite.
- Peasant woman seated at the edge of the forest, (undated), watercolour.

John Joseph's Yorkshire Post 1903 obituary mentioned that one of his works "was purchased for the Leeds Municipal Art Gallery, and is hung there;" as of 2019 the gallery archive still listed one of his watercolours, Arundel Castle from the Meadows but it could not be found.

=== Art reviews ===
After J.J.'s death, the Yorkshire Post and Leeds Intelligencer said this:

"John Joseph Willson ... had reached a degree of proficiency in his art which entitled him to be judged without consideration of his amateurship. Though he had never gone through the mill of technical training he had from the days when he wasted his school time by drawing engines on his slate, always dabbled in art. In his later years, indeed, he had done more than dabble, for he devoted to his water-colour work all the time which a business man could spare from his daily toil, working frequently, if not chiefly, by artificial light - a condition anything but favourable for appreciating the niceties of colouring, and sufficiently accounting for what was perhaps the least satisfactory aspect of his art. Perhaps its most admirable feature was its steady progress. Up to the very last years, when ill-health began to undermine his natural vigour, he was always advancing ... The facility in handling he attained was certainly remarkable, and on this account alone his happiest efforts in landscape-work were capable of holding their own in any of the exhibitions of current art to which he contributed, while the drawing which was some years ago hung in the permanent collection of the Leeds Public Art Gallery is alike worthy of the collection and of the painter who will thus be lastingly commemorated in his native town. [He was] a lovable [man], full of generous enthusiasm, and possessing a winning manner, and an old-fashioned courtliness that made [his] company very enjoyable."

Media related to John Joseph Willson at Wikimedia Commons

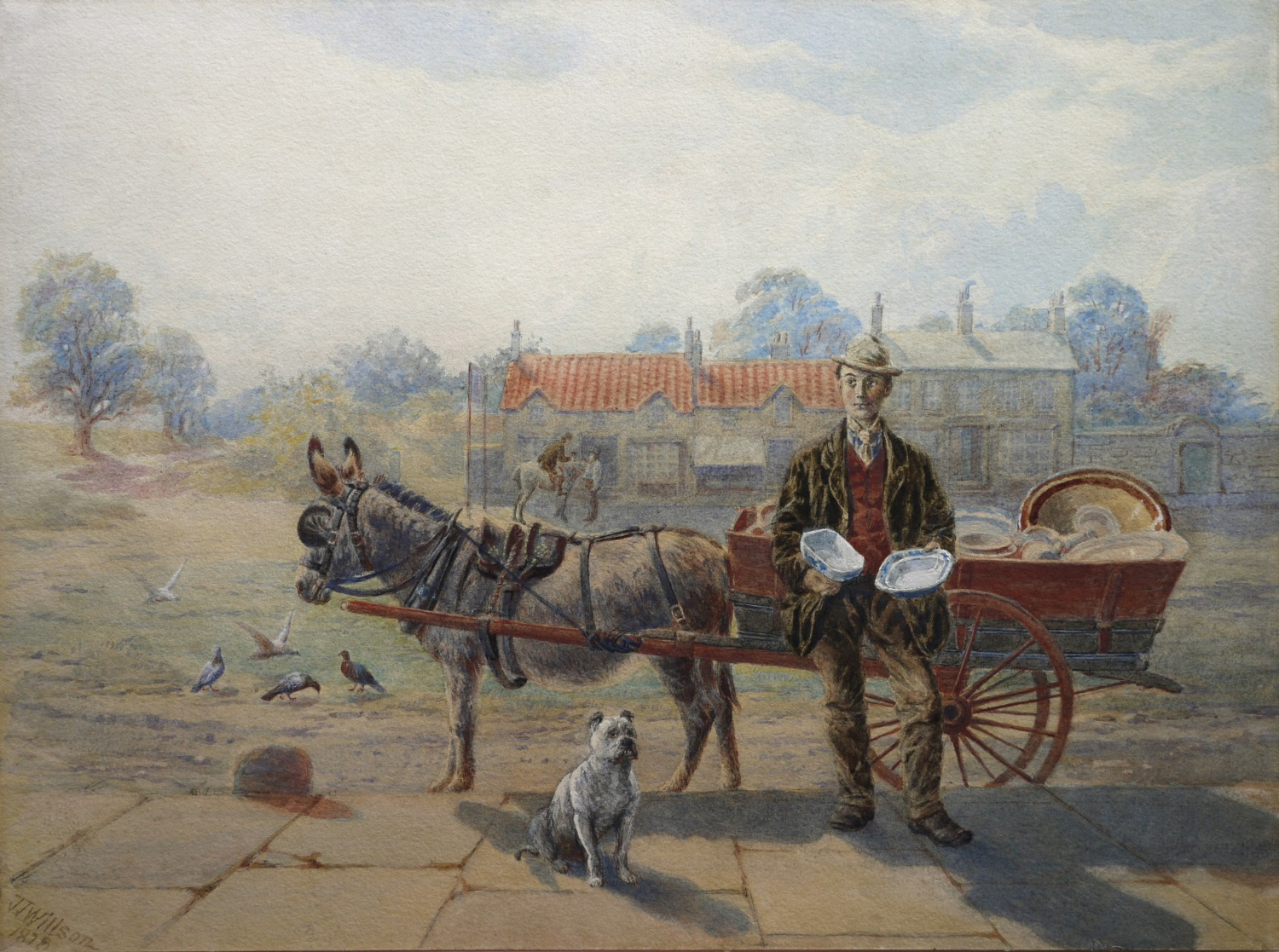
The Pot Hawker, 1878

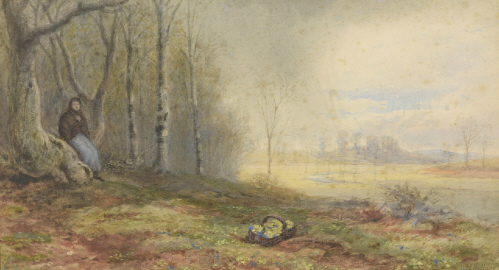
Peasant seated at the edge of the forest, undated

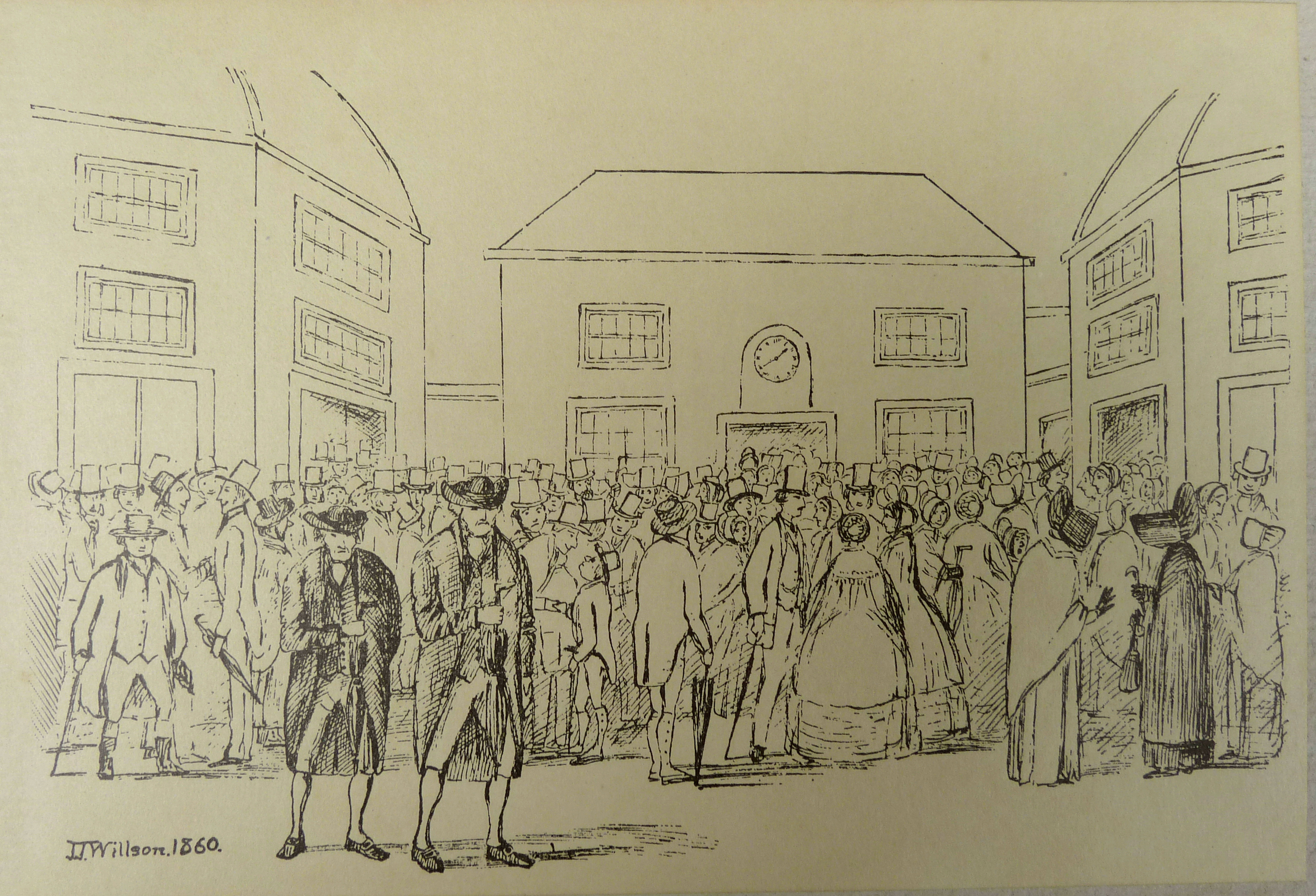
The Meeting House yard, Devonshire House, 1860

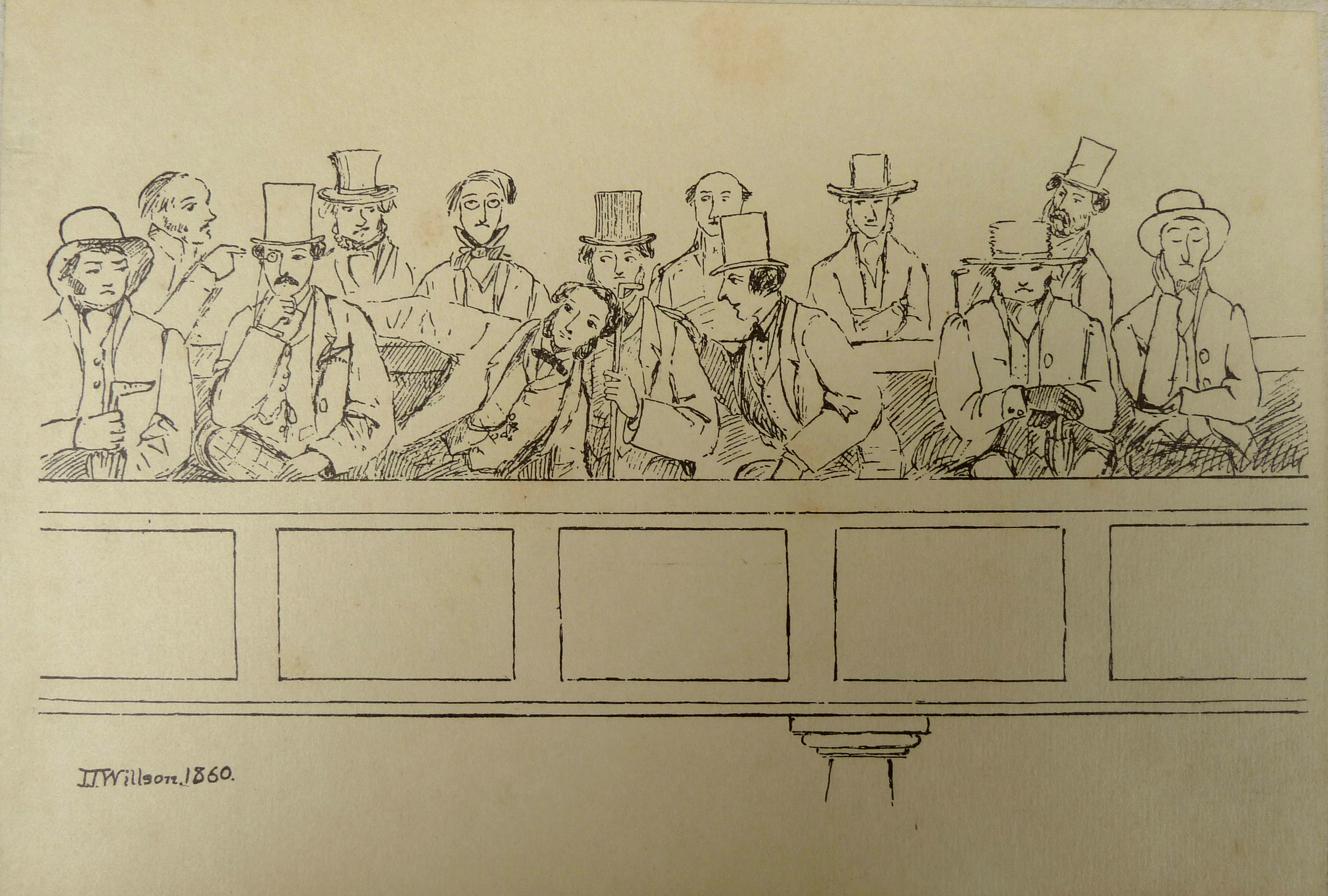
The Men's Side, 1860

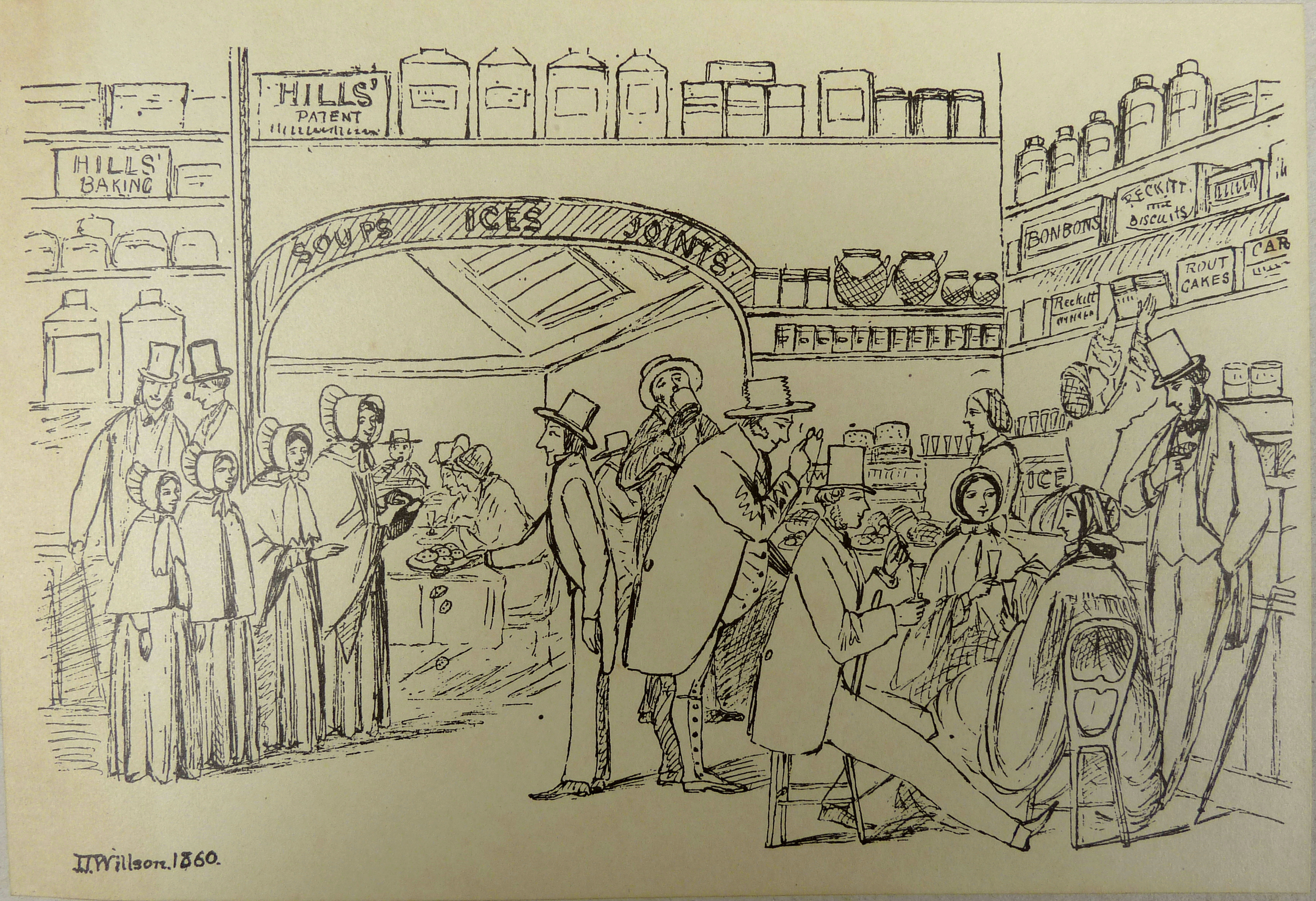
Hills the confectioner's, 1860

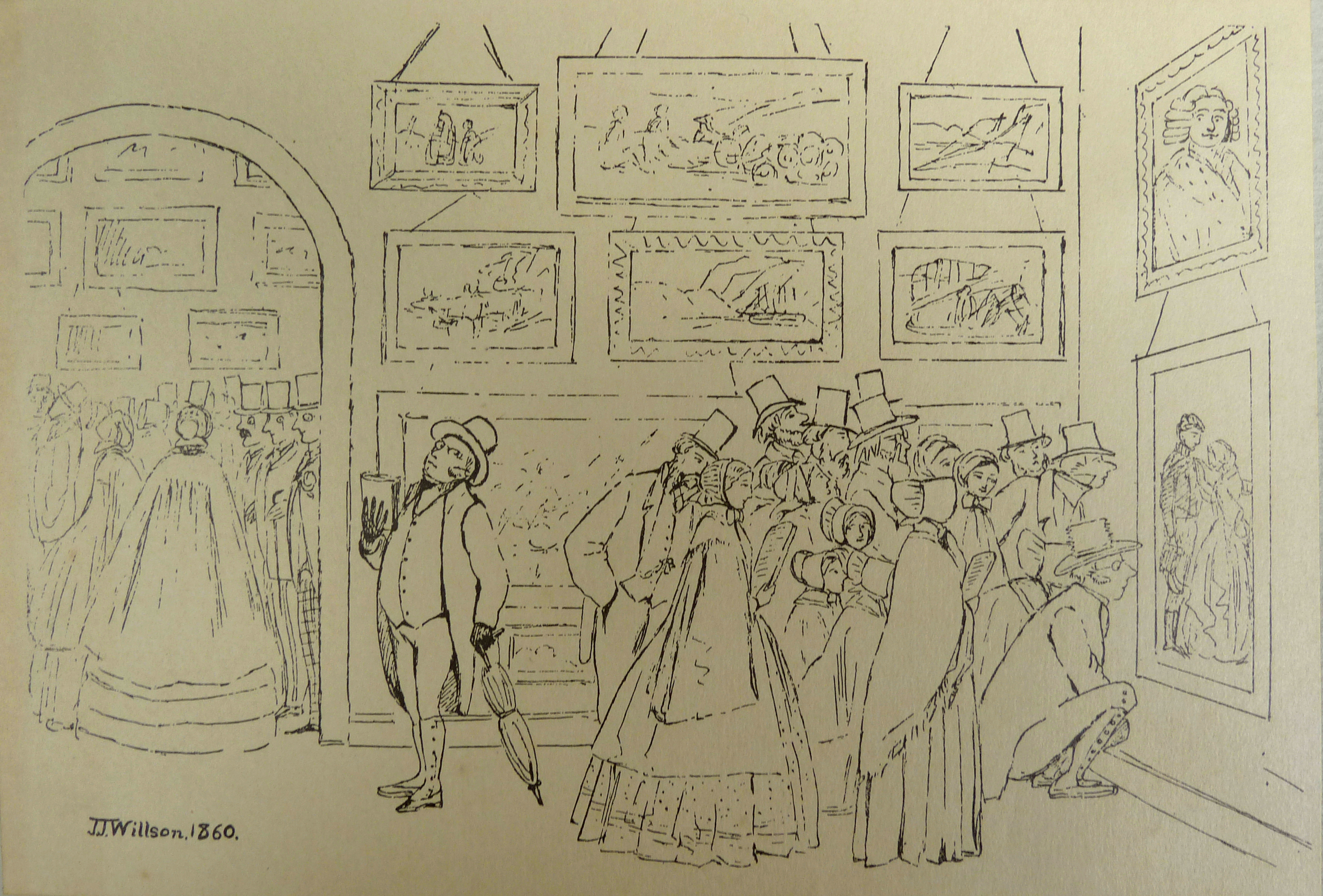
Royal Academy, 1860

== Emilie Dorothy Hilliard Willson ==
Emilie Dorothy Hilliard Willson (New York c. 1838 - Leeds 18 January 1899) was the daughter of architect John Hilliard (d. before 1861) of New York and the American-born wife of John Joseph Willson; they married at the Friends' Meeting House, Scarborough on Thursday 17 October 1861. She also was an exhibiting artist. (Note: As of 2019, evidence of any exhibition or work by Emilie Dorothy Hilliard Willson has not been found) She died aged 60 years on 18 January 1899 at Ballamona, Headingley, of Influenza, pleuropneumonia, and cardiac failure.

== Michael Anthony Hilliard Willson ==
Landscape artist Michael Anthony Hilliard Willson (Kirkstall 13 April 1863 – Ulverston 27 December 1943) was the eldest son of John Joseph Willson. Michael studied at the Leeds College of Art around 1900, listed as M. Hilliard Willson. He had a collection of works of art, part of which was sold at Sotheby's in 1918, under the name, "M.A. Hilliard Willson Esq." (Note: Attributions and signatures of this artist have been reproduced here, because it was previously thought that Michael and his sister Mary shared the same initials M.A.H. Willson, and there was risk of confusion between the two. However Mary's birth certificate gives her initials as M.H. Willson. This now makes their works easier to attribute, however there are still anomalies.) Michael died aged 79 years on 27 December 1943 at 25 Somme Avenue, Ravenstown, Lower Holker, of myocardial degeneration, arteriosclerosis and enlarged prostate.

=== Exhibitions ===
- Unknown work (1886), Leeds Society of Artists exhibition. (Attribution, M.A.H. Willson).
- Our Public Servants (11 February 1890) "very clever character sketches", Leeds Fine Arts Club's conversazione at the Philosophical Hall in Park Row, Leeds. Selected items from the set, exhibited before commercial publication. (Attributed to "Bob").
- Blue Bow (early March 1899) "harmonious, and the face is well behind the frame," Leeds Public Gallery. (Attributed to Mr M.A.H. Willson).
- Mirror frame and panel (1901), Arts and Crafts exhibition at Leeds City Art Gallery. (Attributed to M. Hilliard Willson). (Note: Michael's attribution for the mirror frame may mean that he was also an art metal worker, or that his initials were confused with those of his sister Mary, who was credited for the same work.)

=== Works ===
- Ruins with Man and Dog (1884), pencil drawing. (Signed M.A.H., but attributed to Michael A.H. Willson). (Note: The attribution of Ruins to Michael is not absolute, but the item has been included for possible further research. It is signed MAH.)
- Our Public Servants (March 1891), a set of twelve caricatures signed, "Bob". These were watercolour portraits published as prints, depicting prominent Leeds men: Alderman Archibald Witham Scarr, Sir George Morrison (town clerk), Alderman Sir John Ward (mayor with chain and badge), William Bruce (Leeds stipendiary magistrate), Alderman John Shackleton Mathers, Sir James Kitson, Alderman George Tatham, Rt Hon. William Lawies Jackson MP, John Barran MP, Sir George Irwin, Sir Arthur Lawson and Alderman Reginald Wigram. (Attribution: "Mr Hilliard Willson of Leeds, who gave them to the world over the signature, Bob," or "Mr Hilliard Willson, son of Mr J.J. Willson of Leeds.") Leeds Museums and Galleries holds the set of twelve watercolour originals in its archives, at Leeds Discovery Centre and Leeds Industrial Museum.
- Portrait of George Corson (1901). This is an oil on canvas three-quarter length portrait of Leeds architect George Corson seated, holding papers in front of a landscape, signed M.A.H. Willson. It was commissioned by the Leeds and Yorkshire Architectural Society, whose members paid for it by subscription, Corson being their first president. It was presented to the Society by Corson on 21 November 1901, the Yorkshire Post recording the painter as "Mr H. Willson." (Note: Leeds and Yorkshire Architectural Society, the owners (since 1901) of the Corson portrait, have attributed the painting to Mary A. Hilliard Willson. However, since Mary's birth certificate says that she had no "A" initial, and therefore her initials are M.H. Willson, this painting of Corson should be attributed to her brother Michael, whose initials are M.A.H. Willson.)
- Isaac Reckitt and Ann Reckitt (August 1906); a pair of oil-on-canvas portraits. (Signed M.A.H. Willson).

Media related to Michael Anthony Hilliard Willson at Wikimedia Commons

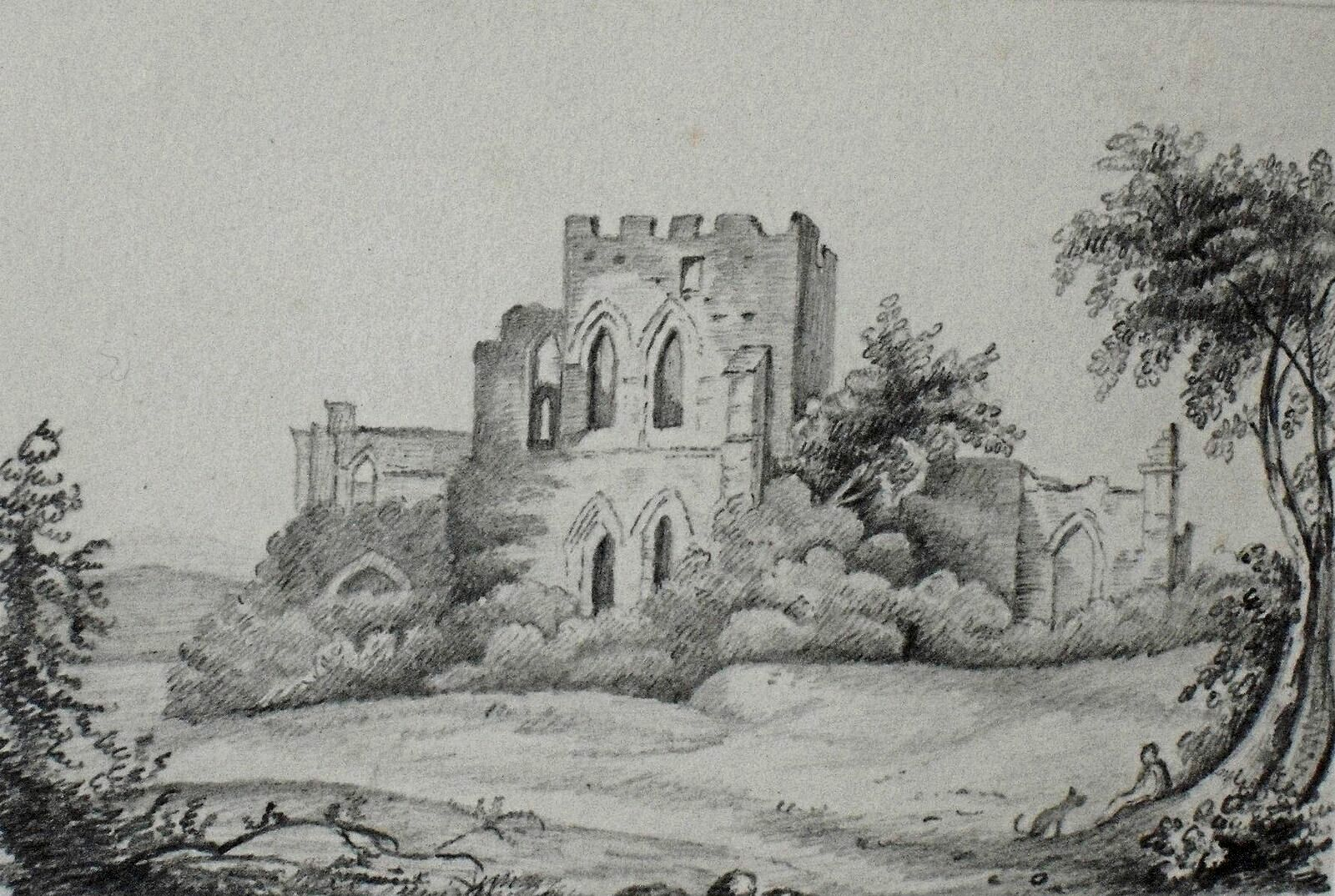
Ruins with man and dog, 1884

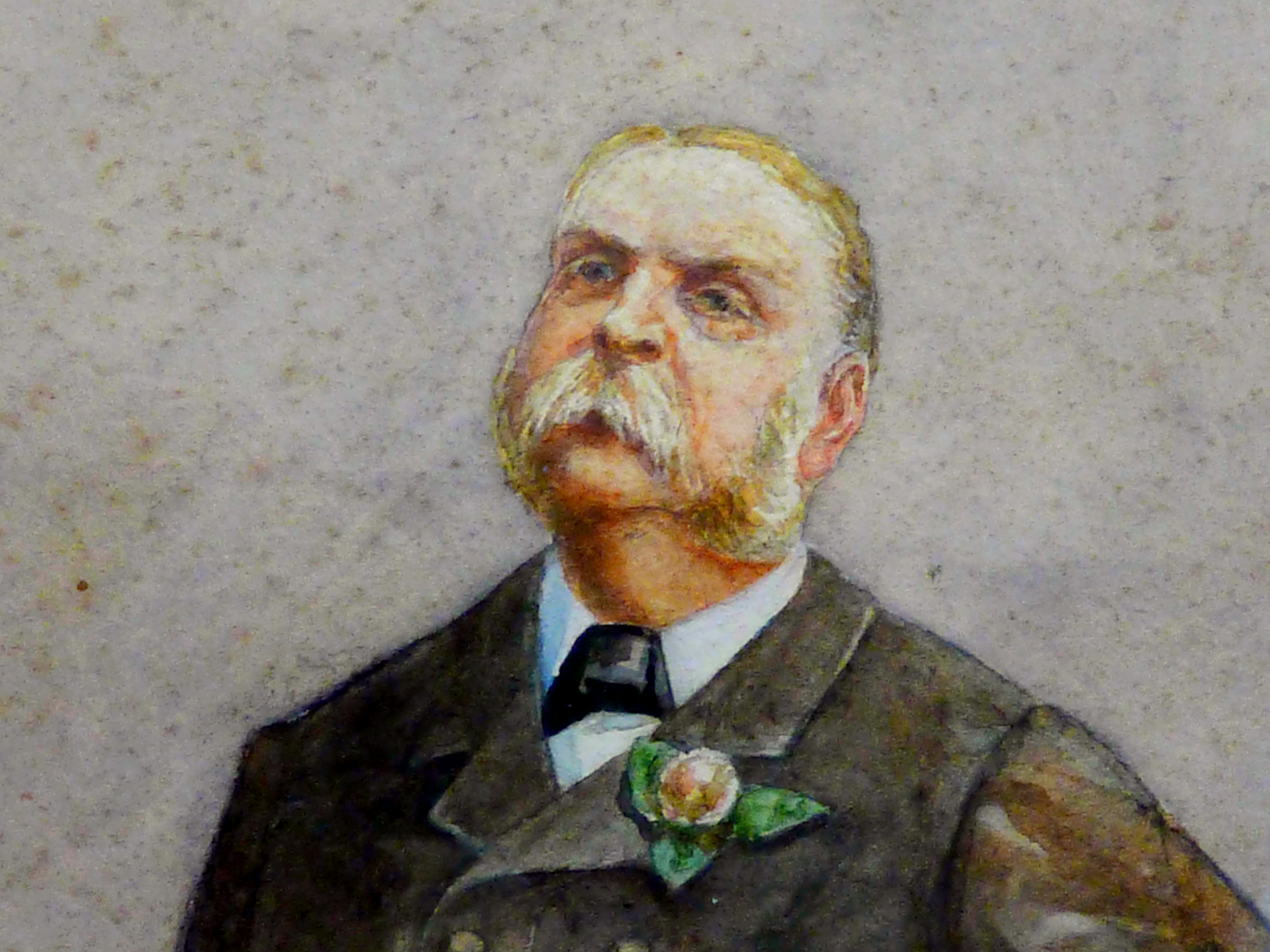
James Kitson, 1891

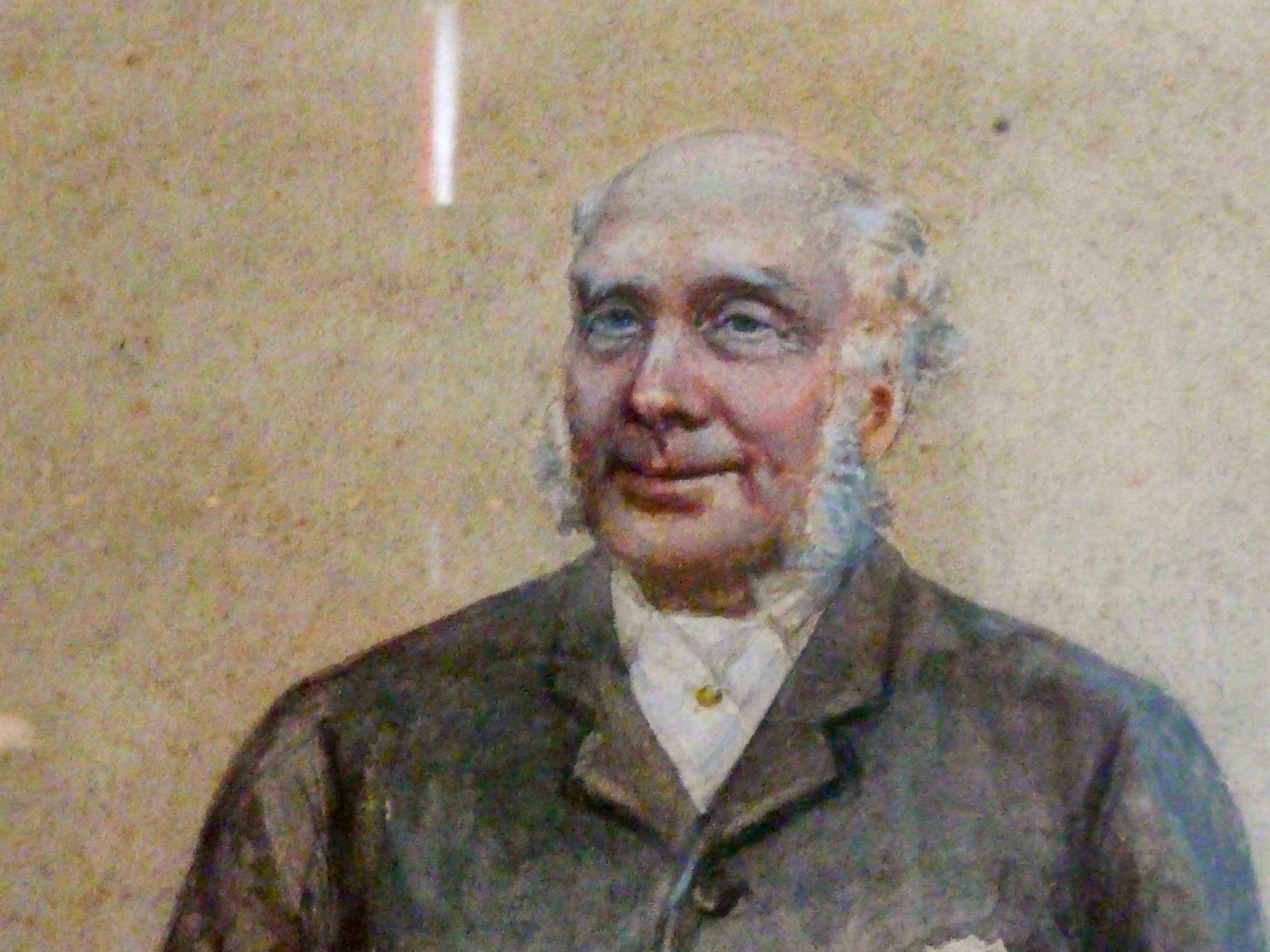
John Barran, 1891

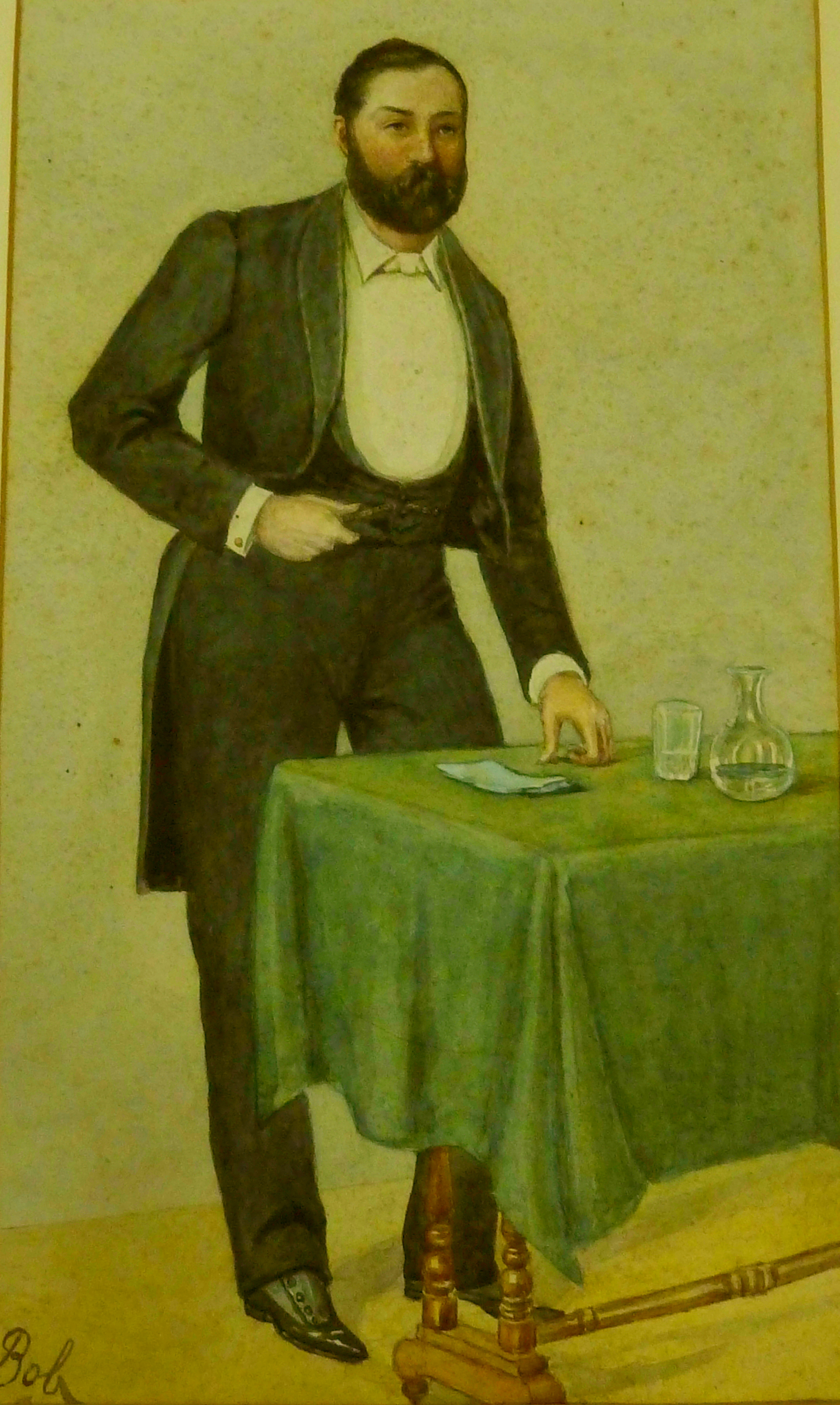
Arthur Lawson, 1891

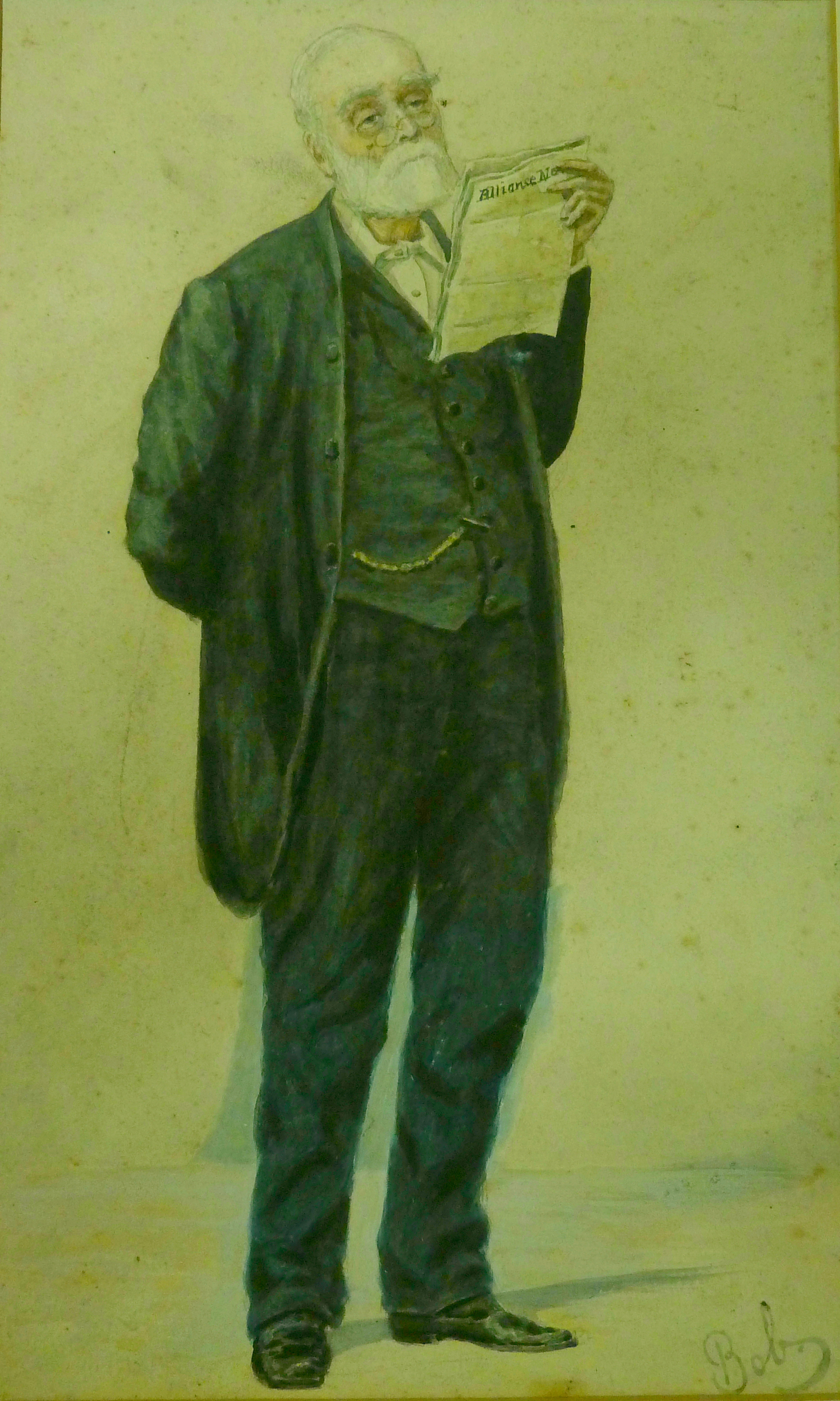
George Tatham, 1891

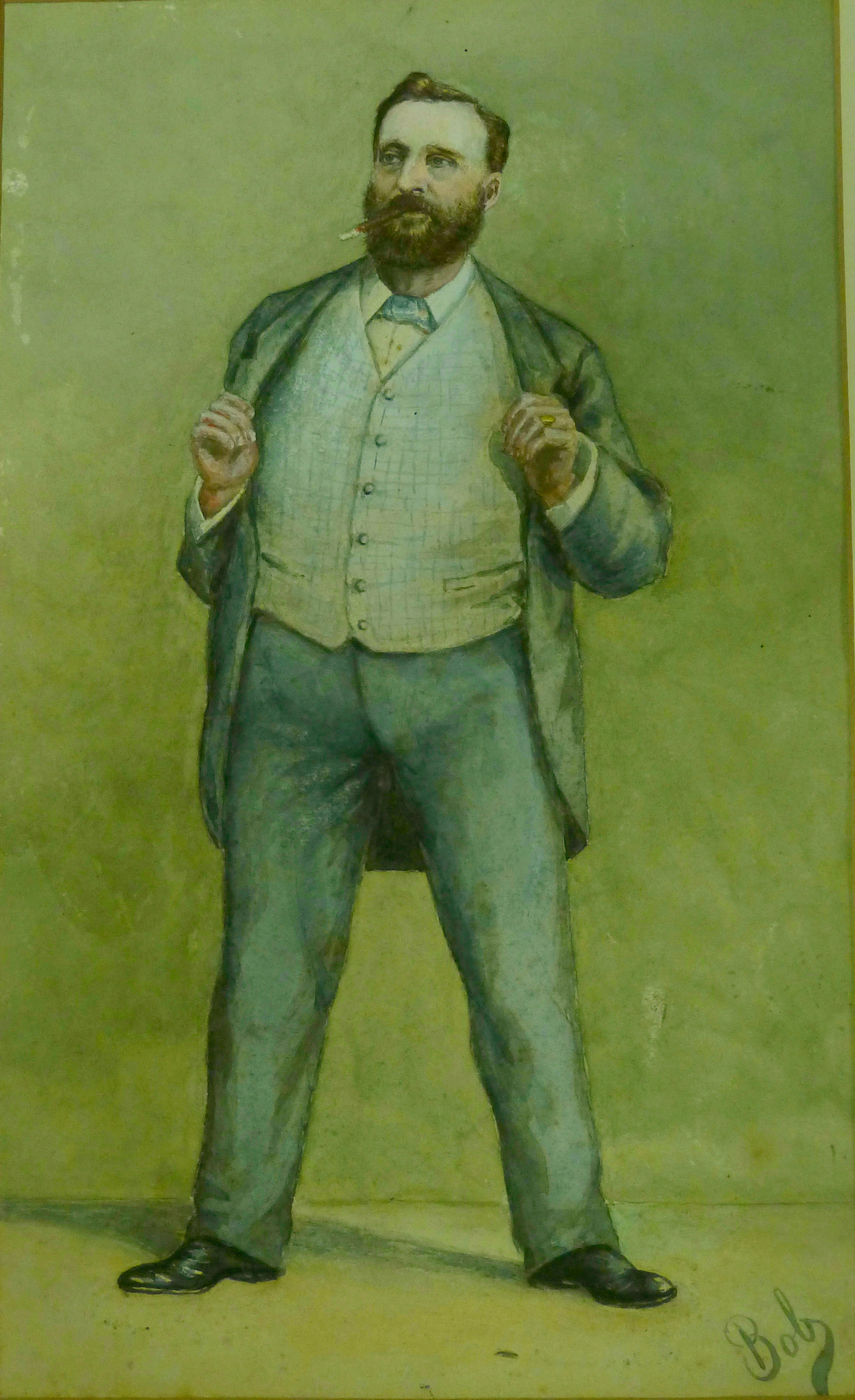
John Shackleton Mathers, 1891

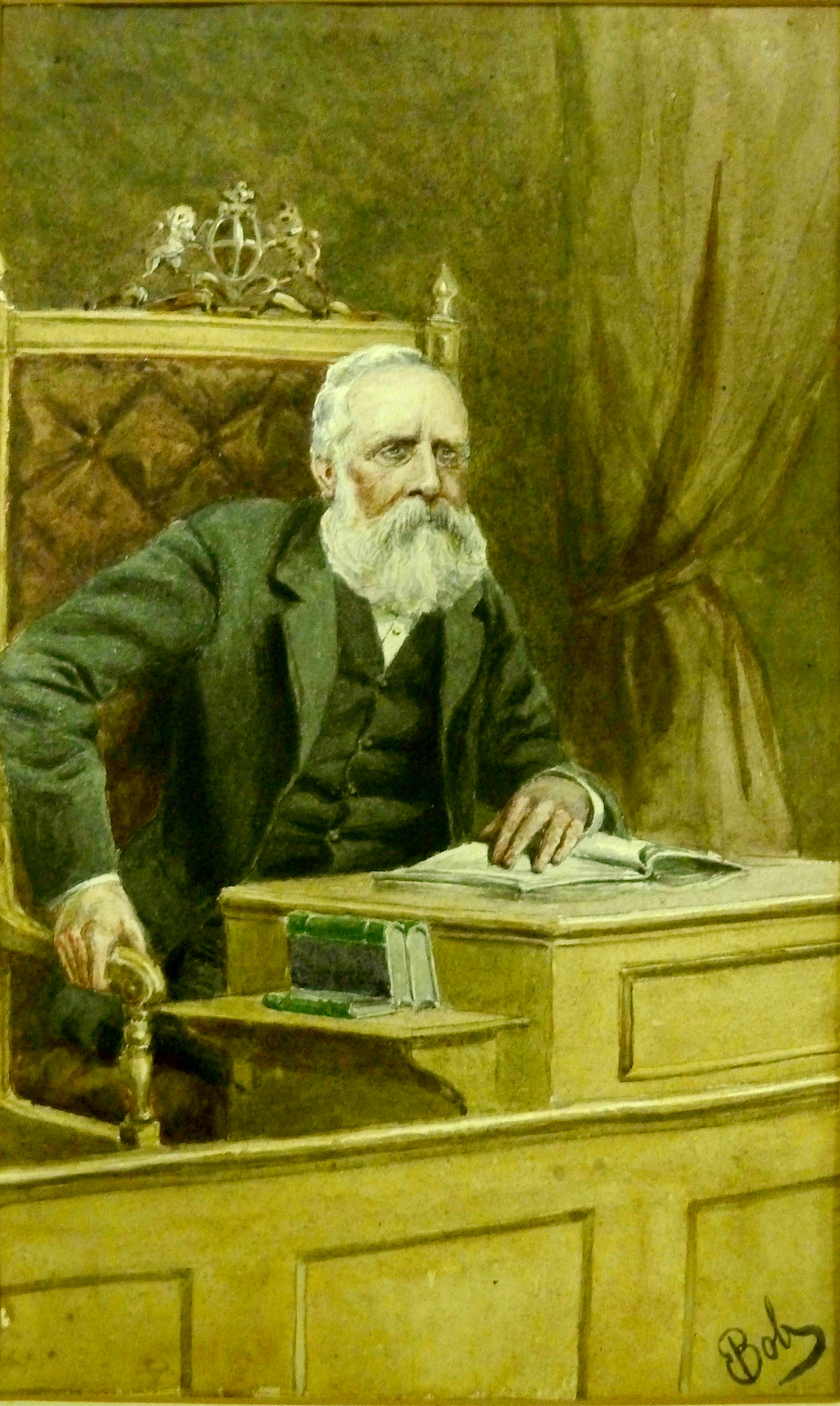
William Bruce, 1891

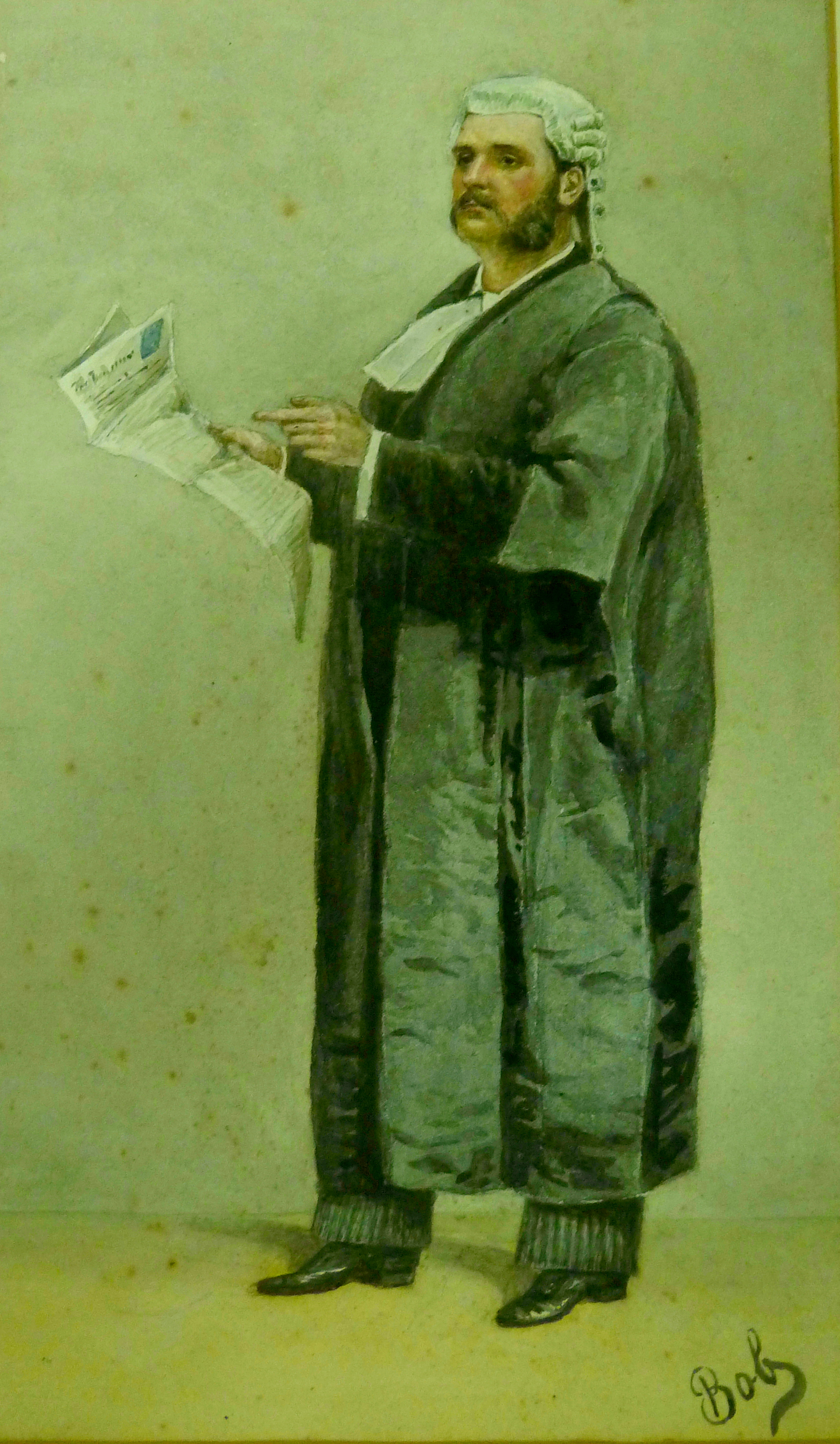
George Morrison, 1891

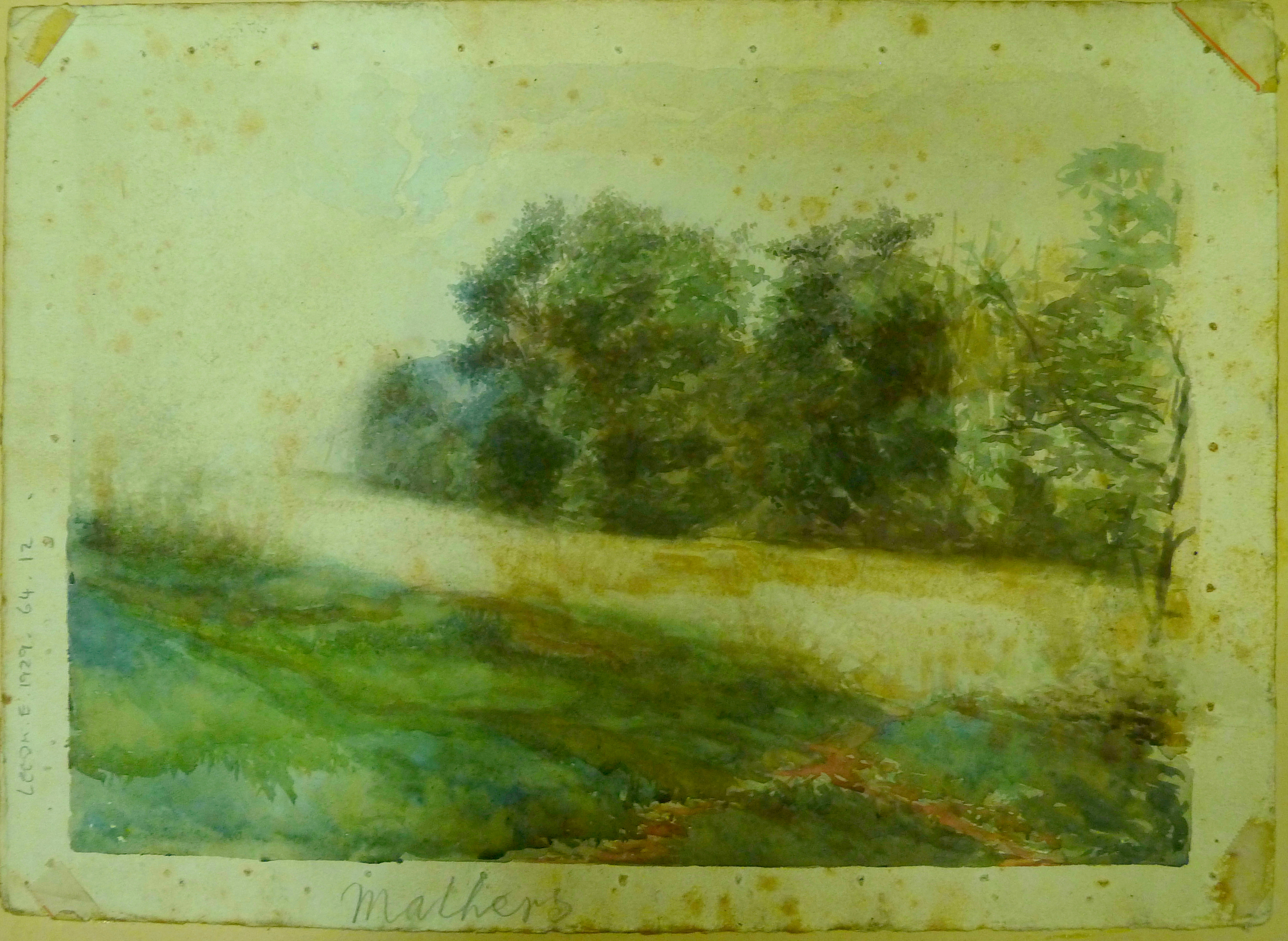
Landscape on reverse of the J.S. Mathers painting

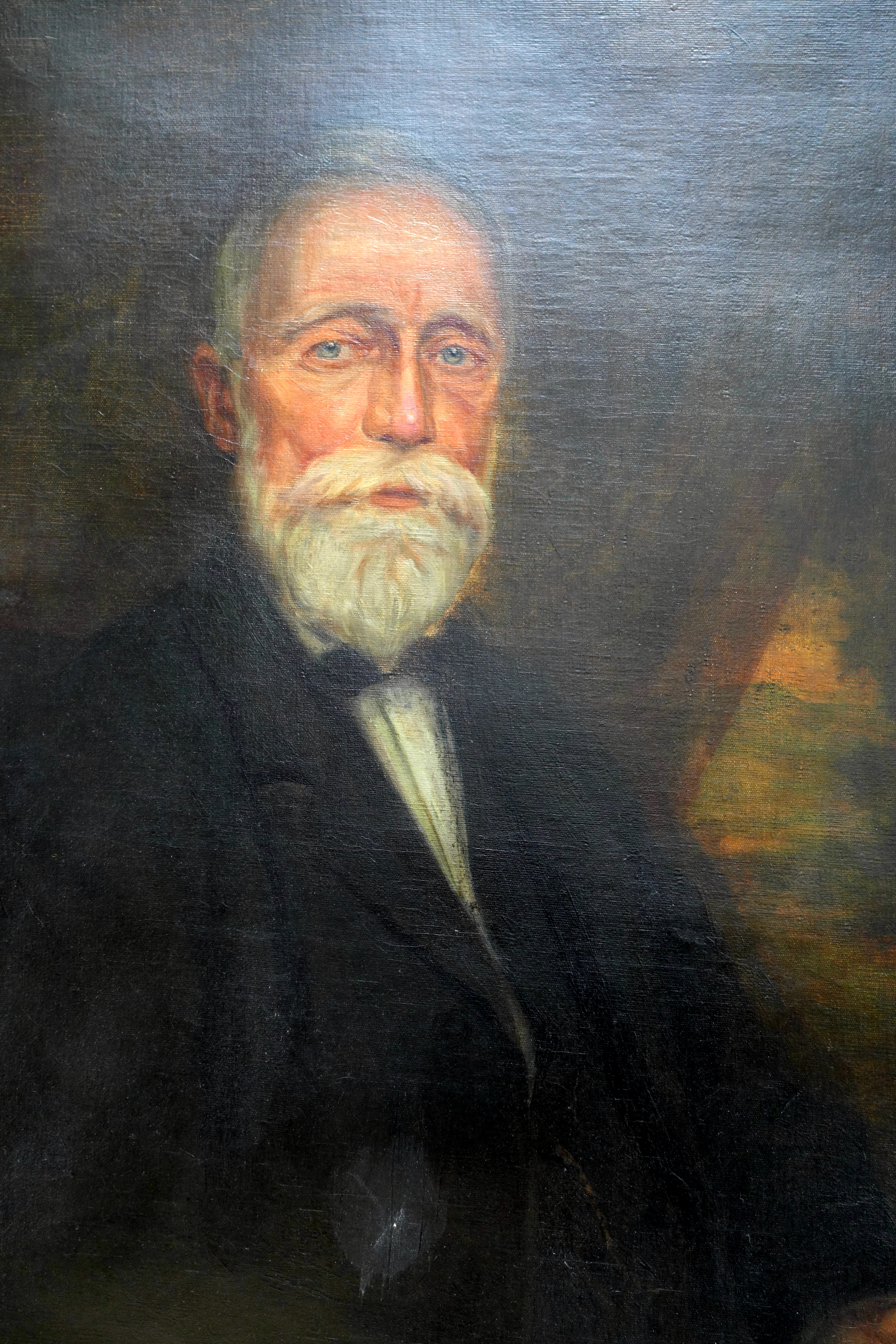
George Corson, 1901

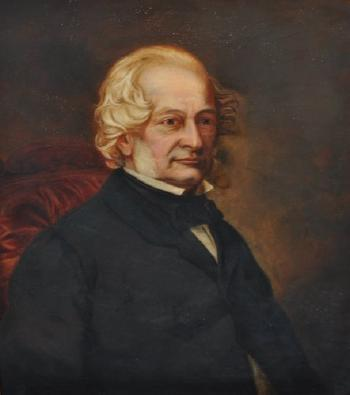
Isaac Reckitt, 1906

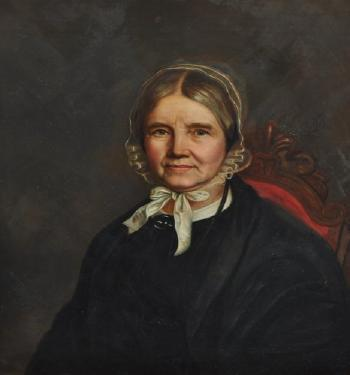
Ann Reckitt, 1906

== Margaret Willson ==
Margaret Willson (Kirkstall 16 August 1867 – Ulverston 8 March 1932), was the twin of Emilie Dorothy Willson. Margaret was the daughter of John Joseph Willson, and was a decorative designer and painter, working in Leeds. Between 1888 and 1906 Margaret was an exhibitor at the Royal Academy of Arts. Margaret died aged 63 years on 8 March 1932 at The Bungalow, Hill of Oaks, Cartmel Fell, of acute enteritis and neurasthenia.

=== London exhibitions ===
- Hydrangeas 894 (1888), oil painting, Royal Academy Summer Exhibition.
- Study of White Orchids 818 (1889), oil painting, Royal Academy Summer Exhibition.
- Cragg Hall and Fewston Reservoir, near Blubberhouses, Yorkshire 1261 (1897), watercolour, Royal Academy Summer Exhibition.
- Portrait of a Lady 871 (1902), watercolour, Royal Academy Summer Exhibition.
- A relic of the Past 939 (1906), watercolour, Royal Academy Summer Exhibition.
- Painted silk fan with pearl mount (1906), Arts and Crafts Exhibition Society's 8th show, at the Grafton Galleries.

=== Local exhibitions ===
- A Study of White Orchids (11 February 1890), "another nice painting", Leeds Fine Arts Club's conversazione at the Philosophical Hall, Leeds.
- A Socialist (11 February 1890), "a cleverly executed study, in which a man with expressive face sits at a table enjoying his pipe and jug of beer. On the wall behind him is a placard addressed to the citizens." LFAC conversazione as above.
- Pastel (11 February 1899), "a clever pastel, good in colour," Leeds Public Gallery.
- Two watercolour portraits, including one of William Harvey (1905), Leeds Exhibition.

== Emilie Dorothy Willson ==
Margaret's twin Emilie Dorothy Willson (Kirkstall 16 August 1867 – York 10 October 1918) was an artist who exhibited at the Royal Academy of Arts, and the Walker Art Gallery at Liverpool. Since she exhibited her works under the name, "E. Dorothy Willson," she is likely to have been known as "Dorothy" to differentiate her from her mother. She died aged 51 years of double pneumonia at The Retreat, York, on 10 October 1918.

=== Exhibitions ===
- A Study of Clematis (11 February 1890), "a charming picture", Leeds Fine Arts Club conversazione at the Philosophical Hall, Leeds
- A Dewy Morning 1241 (1900), watercolour, Royal Academy Summer Exhibition.

== Mary Hilliard Willson ==
Mary Hilliard Willson (Leeds 22 March 1871 – Hill of Oaks 30 May 1928), daughter of John Joseph Willson, was the youngest of the Willson Group. She was attending the Leeds College of Art as a student in 1900, listed as M. Hilliard Willson. In 1901 she won a National Queen's Prize for art there, coming joint fifth in the United Kingdom, listed as Mary Hilliard Willson. She was described as a "designer and art applied worker" in the 1911 Census, and she painted landscapes and oil portraits. Mary died aged 54 years on 30 March 1928, of Brown muscular atrophy of the heart at The Bungalow, Hill of Oaks, Cartmel Fell Rural District. (Note: Attributions, and transcriptions of signatures of this artist have been reproduced here, because it was previously thought that Mary and her brother Michael shared the same initials (M.A.H. Willson), and there was risk of confusion between the two. However Mary's birth certificate has now confirmed her initials as M.H. Hilliard. So, as of September 2019, the attributions of Mary's and Michael's works are more easily distinguished, although there are still some anomalies (see attributions below).)

=== Exhibitions ===
Mary exhibited at various venues from at least 1882, and at the Yorkshire Union of Artists exhibitions and smaller London institutes, between 1888 and 1912 or 1915.

- Drawing (1882), Stockton Fine Art and Industrial Exhibition: third prize in Class 25 for "drawings shaded in crayon or pencil from life or the round." (Attribution, Miss M.A. Hilliard Willson).
- Lane near Meanwood (1885), "richly coloured ... rather defective as to the treatment of the sky, perhaps, but otherwise an effective little picture," Yorkshire Artists' Exhibition. (Attribution, Miss M.A.H. Willson).
- Kirkstall Abbey (1885), "dainty watercolour," Yorkshire Artists' Exhibition. (Attribution, Miss Willson).
- Scene at Moortown (1885), miniature, Yorkshire Artists' Exhibition. (Attribution, Miss Willson).
- Mirror frame (1900), at Leeds City Art Gallery, Arts and Crafts department. (Attribution, M. Hilliard Willson). (Note: The mirror frame is tentatively attributed to "M. Hilliard Willson" by Mapping of Sculpture, but because Mary and Michael shared the same initials, the item has been added to the exhibitions list of both artists, pending further research.)
