= Holker =

Holker may refer to:

== People ==
- Allison Holker (born 1988), American dancer
- John Holker QC (1828–1882), British lawyer and politician
- John Holker (Jacobite) (1719–1786), English Jacobite soldier, industrialist and industrial espionage agent

== Places in England ==
- Lower Holker, civil parish in Cumbria
  - Holker, Cumbria, a hamlet
  - Holker Hall, country house in Cumbria
- Holker Street, sports stadium in Barrow-in-Furness, Cumbria

== See also ==
- Holkar, an Indian dynasty
- Holkar State, a royal state in India ruled by the Holkar
