= Mary Willson =

Mary Willson may refer to:

- Mary A. Hilliard Willson (1871–1928), English Quaker member of the Willson Group of artists
- Mary Ann Willson (active 1810 to 1825), American folk artist
- Mary Elizabeth Willson (1842–1906), American gospel singer, composer, and evangelist

== See also ==
- Mary Wilson (disambiguation)
