= Ravenstown =

Settlement in Cumbria, England

Coordinates: 54.169707°N 2.979516°W

- Location in South Lakeland Location within Cumbria
- OS grid reference: SD360753
- Civil parish: Lower Holker
- Unitary authority: Westmorland and Furness
- Ceremonial county: Cumbria
- Region: North West
- Country: England
- Sovereign state: United Kingdom
- Post town: GRANGE-OVER-SANDS
- Postcode district: LA11
- Dialling code: 015395
- Police: Cumbria
- Fire: Cumbria
- Ambulance: North West
- UK Parliament: Westmorland and Lonsdale

Ravenstown is also a nickname for Baltimore, Maryland.

Ravenstown is a settlement in the Lower Holker parish of the Cartmel Peninsula in Cumbria, England. The village is mostly a housing estate which was built during First World war to serve a new airship station built in the area. Ravenstown lies south of the larger village of Flookburgh and was historically part of Lancashire.

== History ==
Ravenstown was built to serve an airship station for Vickers of Barrow-in-Furness after it was decided that Walney Airfield was deemed too vulnerable to attack from German U-boat attack so a new Airship station was constructed on a site which is now Cark Airfield.

A new village was needed to house the workers at the new airship station which was originally named Flookburgh Model Aero Village which is now Ravenstown in which construction of 250 houses started on 27 March 1917. The roads are named after World War I battles such as Somme and Jutland.

== Transport ==
The main road running in and out of Ravenstown is Winder Lane which runs from Flookburgh.

=== Train ===
The Furness Line runs close to Ravenstown and there is a station located in nearby Cark called Cark and Cartmel railway station.

=== Bus ===
The village has 1 bus route serving it. The 530 to Cartmel then Kendal. This service is run by Stagecoach.

=== Air ===
Cark Airfield is located near to Ravenstown which is a small airfield for general aviation, the nearest airport with scheduled flights is Manchester Airport.

== Governance ==
Ravenstown is part of the Lower Holker Civil Parish.

Ravenstown was originally part of Ulverston Rural District until 1960 when it was replaced with North Lonsdale Rural District. In 1974 Ravenstown became part of the newly formed district of South Lakeland.

Originally Ravenstown was part of Lancashire before it was transferred to the new county of Cumbria in 1974.

Since 2023 it has been administered by Westmorland and Furness Council.

Ravenstown is part of the Westmorland and Lonsdale Constituency whose member of parliament is Tim Farron of the Liberal Democrats.

== Media ==
The local newspapers covering Ravenstown are the North-West Evening Mail, The Westmorland Gazette and the free Grange Now.

The BBC Local Radio station covering Ravenstown is BBC Radio Cumbria and the Independent Local Radio station is Lakeland Radio. Ravenstown is covered by BBC North West and ITV Granada Regions.
