= Listed buildings in Lower Holker =

Lower Holker is a civil parish in the Westmorland and Furness Unitary Authority of Cumbria, England. It contains 62 listed buildings that are recorded in the National Heritage List for England. Of these, five are listed at Grade II*, the middle of the three grades, and the others are at Grade II, the lowest grade. The parish contains the villages of Flookburgh and Cark, and the country house of Holker Hall with its grounds, and is otherwise rural. The hall and items in its grounds are listed. Most of the other listed buildings are in the villages, and most of these are houses and associated structures. Other listed buildings include farmhouses and farm buildings, bridges, a public house, a railway footbridge, a former school, a drinking trough, a market cross, a war memorial, and a church.

== Key ==
Grade	Criteria
II*	Particularly important buildings of more than special interest
II	Buildings of national importance and special interest

== Buildings ==
Name and location	Photograph	Date	Notes	Grade
Canon Winder Hall; 54.16421°N 2.99469°W		16th century (probable)	A farmhouse in roughcast stone that has a slate roof with ball finials on the gables, and two storeys. There are eight bays, the end two bays recessed and lower, and an outshut at the rear. The windows are mullioned, the ground floor windows also have transoms, and some have hood moulds. The doorway between the third and fourth bays has an architrave, a pulvinated frieze, a cornice, and a flat canopy. In the sixth bay is a gabled porch with a plain doorway, and at the north end is a two-storey canted bay window.	II*
Cark Hall, North Cottage and South Cottage; 54.18251°N 2.97418°W	—	1580	A house later divided into three dwellings, it is in roughcast stone with slate roofs. The main block has two storeys with an attic, and four bays, and to the left at right angles is a three-storey four-bay wing. In the main block the first and fourth bays project under gables, and the windows are mullioned with hood moulds. The doorway has Ionic columns, an entablature, and an open semicircular pediment containing an armorial carving.	II*
80 and 82 Main Street, Flookburgh; 54.17463°N 2.97708°W	—	1637	Originally one house, later divided into two, it is in roughcast stone with two storeys, three bays, and a wide gabled wing at the rear. The central doorway has moulded jambs, an embattled, dated and initialled lintel, and a hood mould, and the windows are sashes. In the right return is a mullioned window.	II
Gatepiers, Canon Winder Farmhouse; 54.16432°N 2.99531°W	—	17th century (probable)	The gate piers are set in a stone wall. They consist of ashlar blocks, stepped back to the tops, with deep cornices and ball finials.	II
Raven Winder Farmhouse; 54.16144°N 2.98405°W	—	17th century (probable)	The farmhouse was altered in the 18th century and a rear wing was added in the 19th century. It is in roughcast stone, with a slate roof, two storeys, four bays, and a gabled two-storey wing and an outshut to the rear. The doorway has an architrave and a dated lintel, and the windows are a mix of sashes and casements.	II
18 Market Street, Flookburgh; 54.17426°N 2.97104°W	—	1665	A roughcast stone house with a slate roof, two storeys, two bays, a two-storey rear wing with a single-storey extension, giving a T-shaped plan. Above the door is a lintel with two arches, initials, and the date. To the right of the door is a casement window and a mullioned window, and in the upper floor are fixed windows.	II
1 and 2 Holker Cottages; 54.18408°N 2.98156°W	—	1680	A pair of houses that were altered in the 1840s. They are in roughcast stone with slate roofs, two storeys, four bays, and a lean-to outshut at the rear. The windows are mullioned with hood moulds, and there is a small casement fire window. In the second bay is a doorway with an embattled, dated and initialled lintel and an open timber gabled porch, and in the fourth bay is a porch with hipped roof.	II
Manor House and adjoining outbuildings 54.17443°N 2.96969°W	—	1686	The house and outbuildings are in stone with a slate roof. The house is roughcast, and has two storeys with an attic, a symmetrical front of three bays, and a rear outshut. The windows on the front are mullioned and in the centre is a large gabled dormer. The central doorway has moulded jambs, and an embattled, initialled and dated lintel. At the rear is a doorway with a Tudor arch, a stair window, and in the outshut is a sash window. The outbuilding to the right has various windows and a large entrance.	II*
Cark House; 54.18089°N 2.98041°W	—	1689	The front range of the house dates from the late 18th century. The house is roughcast with quoins, a sill band, a cornice, moulded gutters, and a slate roof. It has three storeys, five bays, and a rear outshut. In the centre is a doorway with Tuscan columns, a frieze and a pediment, and the windows are sashes. In the right return is a doorway with a moulded surround, and an embattled, dated and initialled lintel.	II
41 Main Street, Flookburgh; 54.17451°N 2.97460°W	—	Late 17th or 18th century	A roughcast stone house with a slate roof, two storeys, two bays, and a rear gabled wing. The windows are sashes.	II
59 Main Street, Flookburgh, and outbuilding 54.17454°N 2.97552°W	—	Late 17th or early 18th century (probable)	The house and outbuilding are in roughcast stone, the house has a slate roof, and the outbuilding has a roof of corrugated asbestos. The house has two storeys and two bays, the left bay gabled, and at the rear is a gabled wing. In the ground floor, to the right of the doorway is a bay window with a hipped roof, and to the left is a recessed bow window. The windows in the upper floor are sashes. The outbuilding to the right projects forward, and contains large entrances at the front and the back.	II
Ash Cottage and The Cottage; 54.17998°N 2.97747°W	—	Late 17th or early 18th century (probable)	A pair of roughcast houses with a slate roof and two storeys. There are four bays, the right two bays projecting forward. The windows are of various types, Ash Cottage has a lean-to porch, and The Cottage has a gabled timber porch.	II
Summer House, Cark Hall; 54.18329°N 2.97500°W	—	Late 17th or early 18th century (probable)	The summer house is a rectangular structure in stone with quoins and two storeys. In the east face is an entrance with a lintel, and above it is a window with a moulded surround and an escutcheon. The windows were originally cross-mullioned, and have been altered.	II
Crown Inn; 54.17464°N 2.96923°W		Late 17th or early 18th century (probable)	A public house in roughcast stone with a slate roof, two storeys, four bays, a lean-to extension on the left, and a single storey wing and an extension at the rear. The third bay projects forward as a quadrant. The windows in the first two bays are casements, in the third bay they are three-light sashes, and the fourth bay contains an attic window and a loading door. The entrance to the left of the third bay is approached by steps, and has a bracketed canopy with a modillioned cornice. At the rear are mullioned windows and a stair window.	II
Priest Bridge; 54.18667°N 2.96985°W		17th or 18th century (probable)	The bridge carries a road over the River Eea. It is in stone and consists of a single segmental arch with voussoirs. The coped parapets date from the 20th century; the southwest parapet is corbelled out to the left and recessed to the right in order to straighten the road.	II
Two houses and a barn, Station Road, Cark; 54.17965°N 2.97756°W	—	Late 17th or early 18th century (probable)	The houses and barn are in stone with slate roofs, the houses are roughcast, and the barn has quoins. They have two storeys and four bays. There is a doorway with a moulded surround, and another with a chamfered surround, and the windows are in varying types.	II
Whitewell House; 54.17451°N 2.97450°W	—	Late 17th or 18th century (probable)	A roughcast stone house with a slate roof, two storeys and two bays. In the right bay is a gabled porch, and the windows are sashes. At the rear is a single bay extension protruding to the left, with a corbelled chimney stack in the angle.	II
Holker Hall and terrace wall 54.18817°N 2.98356°W		1720s	A country house modified in 1783–93 by John Carr, altered in 1838–41 by George Webster, and again in 1859–61 by E. G. Paley. Following a fire in 1871 the front block was rebuilt by Paley and Austin. The terrace wall was added in 1910 by Thomas Mawson. The house is in stone, partly roughcast, and has a slate roof. The northeast front has two storeys and twelve bays, and the southeast front has seven bays. Features include two towers, one square with a pyramidal roof, and the other octagonal with an ogival copper cupola, a Doric porch, a bowed stair bay with a Venetian window, a full-height canted bay window with an embattled parapet, string courses, pierced parapets, mullioned and transomed windows, an oriel window, and dormers.	II*
49 and 51 Main Street, Flookburgh; 54.17455°N 2.97520°W	—	Early 18th century (probable)	A workshop, house and surgery in roughcast stone with a slate roof and two storeys. No. 49 probably originated as a barn; it has a barn door and a casement window. No. 51 has sash windows, those in the upper floor in gablets.	II
Lilac Cottage; 54.17184°N 2.97383°W	—	Early 18th century (probable)	A roughcast stone house with a slate roof, two storeys, a symmetrical front of three bays, and a rear lean-to outshut. On the front is a gabled porch, and the windows are casements.	II
Ice house, Holker Hall; 54.18718°N 2.99256°W	—	Before 1732	The ice house is in stone, slate and brick, and is covered in earth. It is a round structure with two tiers, the upper tier smaller. The entrance has a slate door, there are two inner doors, and a floor sloping down to a central drain. On the top is an iron ventilating pipe.	II
43 Market Street, Flookburgh; 54.17462°N 2.96956°W	—	Early to mid 18th century (probable)	A roughcast stone house with a slate roof, two storeys and two bays. In the centre is a timber porch with an ornate gable. The windows are sashes, and at the rear is a small-paned stair window.	II
21 Market Street, Flookburgh; 54.17447°N 2.97100°W	—	18th century (probable)	Originally a public house, later a private house, it is in roughcast stone with a slate roof, two storeys and three bays. The central doorway has a canopy on brackets, and the windows are 20th-century casements with segmental heads.	II
27 Market Street, Flookburgh; 54.17450°N 2.97059°W	—	18th century (probable)	Originally a shop, later a house, it is in roughcast stone with a slate roof, two storeys, two bays, and a long rear wing. In the ground floor is a doorway with a fanlight, and to the right is a former shop front with flat pilasters and an entablature containing a triple sash window. In the upper floor and in the rear wing are sash windows.	II
1 and 2 The Fold, Cark; 54.18026°N 2.97820°W	—	18th century (probable)	A pair of roughcast stone houses with a slate roof, two storeys, three bays, and a long rear range. The windows are sashes, and over the doorway of No. 2 is a flat canopy on brackets.	II
Bridge over River Eea to Cark Farm; 54.18094°N 2.98115°W	—	18th century (probable)	The bridge carries a road over the River Eea. It is in stone and consists of a single segmental arch. The bridge has dressed voussoirs, and the parapets have triangular coping.	II
Bridge over River Eea to Cark House; 54.18106°N 2.98033°W	—	18th century (probable)	The bridge carries a road over the River Eea. It is in stone and consists of a single segmental arch. The bridge has dressed voussoirs, low parapets with iron railings on the east side. There are flanking walls on the west side curving outwards and with coping. At the ends are rusticated stone piers with caps.	II
Bridge over River Eea to Low Row Cottages, east end 54.18094°N 2.97882°W	—	18th century (probable)	The bridge crossing River Eea is in stone and consists of a single segmental arch. The parapets have triangular coping.	II
Field Head; 54.17192°N 2.97363°W	—	Mid 18th century (probable)	A roughcast stone house with a slate roof and two storeys. There are four bays, the fourth bay recessed and lower, and a lean-to at the rear. The doorway has a moulded surround, flat pilasters, an inscribed frieze, and a pediment on consoles. The windows in the front are top-hung casements, and at the rear are mullioned windows, sash windows, and a stair window.	II
121 Station Road, Cark; 54.17972°N 2.97701°W	—	Mid to late 18th century	A roughcast stone house with a slate roof, two storeys, three bays, a gabled rear wing and a rear outshut. The windows are sashes and on the front is a trellis porch with a flat roof.	II
Cark Manor and Garden Flat; 54.18192°N 2.98145°W	—	Late 18th century (probable)	A country house in roughcast stone with hipped slate roofs, two storeys and six bays. Most windows are sashes, there are also French windows and a canted oriel window. At the west end is an eight-bay verandah with fluted Tuscan columns. At the rear is a large projecting wing, and in the angle is an entrance tower with a swept pyramidal roof and a weathervane; it has a Tuscan porch and a door with a fanlight. External steps lead up to the entrance to the flat. At the east end is a polygonal bay window with an entablature and a balustrade.	II
Grize Pool Bridge; 54.18299°N 2.99222°W	—	1781	The bridge carries a track over a drainage channel. It is in stone and consists of a single low segmental arch. The bridge has curved parapets, a datestone, end piers, and flat bands.	II
Mill House; 54.18104°N 2.97770°W	—	c. 1782	A roughcast stone house with a slate roof, two storeys at the front and three at the rear. There are three bays and a lower three-bay extension to the right. The doorway has Tuscan columns with fluted capitals, a pulvinated frieze with rosettes, and a pediment. In the main part most of the windows are sashes with one casement window, and in the extension the windows are of mixed types.	II
Dove Cottage and Mackereth's Cottage; 54.18673°N 2.98113°W	—	Probably before 1797	A pair of houses that were altered in about 1840. They are in roughcast stone with a slate roof. There are two storeys and a south front of three bays. The middle bay is gabled, and contains a Venetian window, and in the gable is a panel with a cedar tree. Recessed to the left is a single-storey range with an open timber hipped porch, and recessed to the right is a single-storey range with a plain porch.	II
Park View Cottages; 54.18639°N 2.98138°W	—	Probably before 1797	Originally stables, converted into houses in the 19th century. They are in roughcast resembling dressed stone, and have a slate roof. The east front has two storeys and seven bays, the middle bay projecting forward under a gable, and at the rear is a two-bay hipped projection. The windows are casements, most with iron glazing bars in octagon and square patterns. On the front are two lean-to open porches with slate roofs and latticework sides.	II
Strand Bridge; 54.17027°N 2.99302°W		1797	The bridge carries a track over a drainage channel. It is in stone and consists of a single segmental arch. The bridge has curved parapets, a datestone, end piers, and flat bands.	II
3 and 4 The Fold; 54.18036°N 2.97829°W	—	18th or early 19th century	A pair of roughcast houses with a slate roof. They have two storeys and four bays, and the windows are top-hung windows.	II
2 Market Street and 1 Church Walk, Flookburgh; 54.17430°N 2.97170°W	—	Early 19th century (probable)	A house and a shop in roughcast stone with a hipped Welsh slate roof and two storeys. The house, on Market Street, has two bays, canted bay windows in the ground floor, and casement windows above. The front facing Church Walk, incorporates the shop, and contains casement windows and a doorway.	II
Cark Manor Cottage, railings and gate 54.18230°N 2.97991°W	—	Early 19th century	A lodge in roughcast stone with ornamental brackets to the eaves and a slate roof with a lead ridge. It has one storey and three bays, with a canted south end. The windows have ornamental glazing: they and the doorway have hood moulds. The railings have a stone base, they curve towards the entrance, and have ornamental finials alternating with acorn finials. The piers are rusticated with ogee caps; the gate piers have urns, and the others have ball finials.	II
Railings opposite Cark Manor Cottage; 54.18238°N 2.97972°W	—	Early 19th century	The railings on the opposite side of the road from the entrance to the cottage are in iron and stretch for about 90 metres (300 ft). They have a stone base and end piers. Alternate railings have a serpentine shape, and the finials alternate between being ornamental and acorns. The piers are rusticated, and have ogee caps with oak leaves.	II
Flookburgh Farmhouse and buildings 54.17356°N 2.97123°W	—	Early 19th century	The farm buildings form three sides of a courtyard, with the farmhouse in the northwest angle; they are in stone with slate roofs. The farmhouse is roughcast, with quoins, two storeys, two bays, and a single-storey four-bay north range incorporated into the house. The windows are sashes, and above the door is a fanlight. The east range has two storeys and five bays. The central bay projects forward, it has a pedimented gable, and contains an elliptical-headed entrance with a rusticated surround. The range contains windows, pitching holes and a loading door. The south range has four bays, and contains a barn entrance.	II
North Lodge and gate piers, Holker Hall; 54.19122°N 2.98594°W	—	Early 19th century (probable)	The lodge is in roughcast stone with ashlar dressings, and has a slate roof with coped gables and a finial on the east gable. It has one storey, a north front with two bays, and a rear wing with three bays. The windows on the front have glazing with iron glazing bars in octagon and square patterns, and in the rear wing they are casements. To the north of the lodge a low wall leads to round rusticated gate piers with domed caps.	II
Former Post Office; 54.18032°N 2.97801°W	—	Early 19th century (probable)	A roughcast house with a slate roof, two storeys, two bays, and a rear wing. Most of the windows are sashes, and above the central doorway is a flat canopy on brackets.	II
Underpass; 54.19049°N 2.98388°W	—	Early to mid 19th century (probable)	The underpass goes under the B5278 road, and gives access to the kitchen garden from the gardens of Holker Hall. It consists of a limestone arch, with abutments giving the effect of a grotto.	II
22 Market Street, Flookburgh; 54.17434°N 2.97057°W	—	1839	Originally a stable block, later used for other purposes, it is in roughcast stone, and has a slate roof, two storeys and a basement, and three bays. The building contains an elliptical-headed barn entrance with a rusticated surround, a doorway and two windows, one blocked. In the upper floor are three pitching holes, and a datestone, and at the left a ramp leads down to the basement.	II
Park View, Rose Cottage and Rose Dene; 54.18553°N 2.98128°W		Before 1847	A row of three roughcast houses on a plinth, with quoins, slate roofs, and two storeys. There are five bays, the first bay projecting forward with a gable; the other bays have gablets. In the left return is a projecting gabled bay with a hipped timber porch. All the gables have decorative bargeboards, and the windows are casements with iron glazing bars in octagon and square patterns.	II
3 and 4 Holker Cottages; 54.18421°N 2.98162°W		Before 1849	A pair of roughcast stone houses with a slate roof, two storeys and three bays. The windows are casements with iron glazing bars in octagon and square patterns, and the ground floor windows have hood moulds. There are doorways on the front and in the right return, both with open timber gabled porches.	II
Shorthorn Farmhouse; 54.18539°N 2.98096°W	—	Before 1849	The farmhouse is in roughcast stone with quoins and a slate roof. There are two storeys and four bays, the fourth bay gabled and projecting forward, and there is a smaller gable over the second bay. The right return has three bays, one of which projects and is gabled; all the gables have decorative bargeboards. On the front is an open timber porch with a gablet. The windows have iron glazing bars in octagon and square patterns.	II
Whitegates Cottages; 54.18987°N 2.98199°W	—	After 1849	A pair of semi-detached houses in roughcast stone with a stone plinth, quoins and slate roofs. They have two storeys, a symmetrical front of four bays, and two rear wings. Each bay has a gable with decorative bargeboards and a finial. In the outer bays are open timber gabled porches with finials and latticework sides. The windows are casements with stone lintels and iron glazing bars in octagon and square patterns.	II
Bridge over River Eea to Low Row Cottages, west end 54.18110°N 2.97985°W	—	19th century (probable)	The bridge carries a road over the River Eea. It is in stone and consists of a single segmental arch on a skew.	II
Footbridge, Cark and Cartmel railway station 54.17796°N 2.97390°W		1857	The footbridge was built for the Ulverstone and Lancaster Railway (later part of the Furness Railway), and is in cast and wrought iron. The stairs have openwork balusters and newels with ball finials, the landings have fluted columns with round bases and foliated capitals, and the landings and the bridge have lattice balustrades.	II
Farm building, Shorthorn Farm; 54.18560°N 2.98098°W	—	1861	The building consists of a barn with an outshut to the south, and ranges to the north and east. It is in stone with quoins and a slate roof, and has gables with decorative bargeboards. On the west gable is a ball finial. The outshut has a front of three bays, the middle bay projects forward, and has a small-paned window, a hood mould, a gable and a datestone.	II
Pear Tree Cottage and Upper Pear Tree Cottage; 54.18696°N 2.98074°W	—	1862	A pair of roughcast stone houses with a slate roof. They have three bays, the first bay has two storeys, the others have three, and there is a single-bay lean-to outshut at the right. The windows are casements with iron glazing bars in octagon and square patterns, and most have hood moulds. On the front is an open timber porch and a door with a fanlight. In the right return are two gabled dormers. All the gables have decorative bargeboards.	II
Stable block, Holker Hall; 54.18798°N 2.98261°W		1864	Designed by Miles Thompson, the block has since been converted and used for other purposes. It is in stone with a slate roof and two storeys, and has a U-shaped plan. The main block has five bays, with lower wings of three bays, the left wing also having a single-bay single-storey extension. Most of the windows are casements. The main block has three gablets with decorative bargeboards and finials, and the central bay has a timber bell turret with a pyramidal roof, a clock and a weathervane. Other features include segmental-headed carriage doorways and loading doors with external steps.	II
School House and Old School Building; 54.18403°N 2.98066°W		1864	Originally a school and school house by Miles Thompson, it has since been used for other purposes. The building is in limestone with sandstone dressings and a slate roof. The school has one storey and four bays, the first bay projecting forward and gabled, and containing a five-light mullioned window. The third bay also is gabled and the gables have decorative bargeboards. To the north is the house with two storeys, a single bay at the front and three bays on north front, a gablet with a plain bargeboard, and casement windows.	II
Trough; 54.18672°N 2.98063°W	—	Mid to late 19th century (probable)	A gabled structure in limestone with buttresses and a recess with a chamfered arch. In the recess is a trough, and the wall above it contains an iron water spout in the form of a lion's mask.	II
Entrance gates and railings, Holker Hall; 54.18509°N 2.98160°W		c. 1875	The entrance was designed by Paley and Austin. The decorative wrought iron gates are flanked by rusticated and partly fluted stone gate piers with entablatures, ogee caps, and ball finials. Outside these are single gates, and curved low walls with railings. At the south end is another pier with a ball finial.	II
South Lodge, Holker Hall; 54.18519°N 2.98156°W		1875	The lodge, by Paley and Austin, is in limestone with quoins, a cornice, and a slate roof with stone ridges and coped gables. There are two storeys and an L-shaped plan. On the south front is a bow window with a coped parapet. In the angle is a timber porch with a hipped roof and a frieze, and the doorway has an embattled and dated lintel. The windows are mullioned with hood moulds, and on the north front is a single-storey hipped projection.	II
Market Cross; 54.17435°N 2.97151°W		1882	The base and steps are probably from an earlier date. The cross is in stone, and consists of three square steps, and a moulded base with an inscription recording the dates of market charters. The faces of the cross are flat, it has splayed ends, and there is a pierced lozenge in the centre.	II
St John the Baptist's Church; 54.17603°N 2.97357°W		1897–1900	The church, designed by Austin and Paley, is in stone, with a roof of sandstone flags, and a lead roof to the apse. It is on a sloping site, and consists of a nave with a clerestory, north and south aisles, a south porch, and a chancel with a north chapel, a south organ loft, and an apse with a vestry beneath. At the west end is a broad tower with three stages, clock faces on four sides, a corbelled parapet with copings, and a saddleback roof with a weathervane in the form of a fish. The windows are lancets.	II*
War memorial 54.17606°N 2.97327°W		1922	The war memorial is in the churchyard of St John the Baptist's Church. It is in stone, and consists of a floriated cross on a tapering shaft, a circular plinth, and a two-tiered base, in all about 4.5 metres (15 ft) high. The cross has an ornate head, and a decorated shaft with a moulded cap and foot. On the plinth are inscriptions and the names of those lost in the First World War.	II
Building south-east of Cark House; 54.18076°N 2.98010°W	—	Undated	A former farm building, it is in stone with quoins, a slate roof, and two storeys. There is a mullioned window, and the other windows are casements.	II
