= Holker Hall =

Country house in Cumbria, England

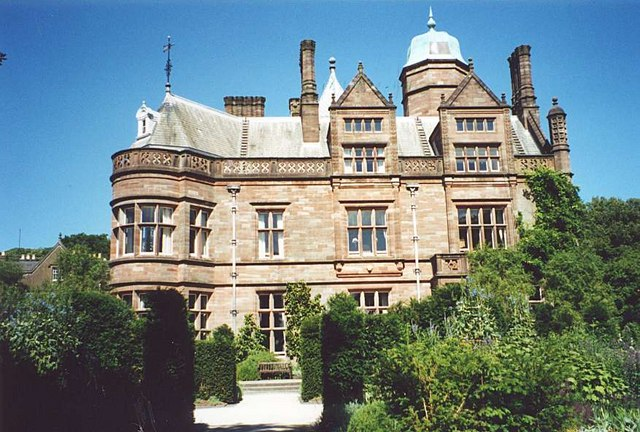
- South face of Holker Hall

- Location in Cumbria
- 54.1881°N 2.9837°W
- OS grid reference: SD 359,774

Site notes
- Architect(s): John Carr, George Webster, Paley and Austin

Listed Building – Grade II*
- Designated: 25 March 1970
- Reference no.: 1335814

Holker Hall (pronounced Hooker by some) is a privately owned country house located about 2 km to the south-west of the village of Cartmel in the ceremonial county of Cumbria and historic county of Lancashire, England. It is "the grandest [building] of its date in Lancashire ...by the best architects then living in the county." The building dates from the 16th century, with alterations, additions, and rebuilding in the 18th and 19th centuries. The 19th century rebuilding was by George Webster in Jacobean Revival style and subsequent renovations were by E. G. Paley. Hubert Austin had a joint practice with Paley by the 1870s and they both rebuilt the west wing after it was destroyed by a major fire in 1871, only a decade after Paley's previous work on the structure. The fire also destroyed a number of notable artworks. Holker Hall is Paley and Austin's "most important country house commission." The architectural historian Nikolaus Pevsner expressed the opinion that the west wing is the "outstanding domestic work" of Paley and Austin. In 1970 the hall itself, together with its terrace wall, were designated Grade II* Listed buildings. The house stands in an estate of about 80 hectares, and is surrounded by formal gardens, parkland and woodland. Within the grounds are six structures listed at Grade II.

Since becoming a private house following the Dissolution of the Monasteries, the estate has never been sold, having passed by inheritance from the Preston family to the Lowther family, and then to the Cavendish family. The house and grounds are open to the public at advertised times on payment of an admission fee.

In chronostratigraphy, the British sub-stage of the Carboniferous period, the "Holkerian" derives its name from Holker Hall.

== History ==
=== Medieval period: Cartmel Priory ===
The land on which the house stands was originally owned by Cartmel Priory.

=== 16th to 18th centuries ===
Following the Dissolution of the Monasteries in the 16th century it was bought by the Preston family, who were local landowners. The first house was built in the early 16th century by George Preston. In 1644 the estate was confiscated from his successor, Thomas Preston, by Parliament, but was later restored to him. On the death of Thomas Preston, the estate passed to the Lowther family by the marriage of Thomas' heiress, Catherine, to Sir William Lowther, 1st Baronet, of Marske. In 1756 it passed again by marriage to Lord George Augustus Cavendish, and has remained in the ownership of the Cavendish family since.

The Jacobean house was altered in 1783–84 by John Carr of York. The parkland around the house was laid out in the late 18th century.

=== 19th century ===
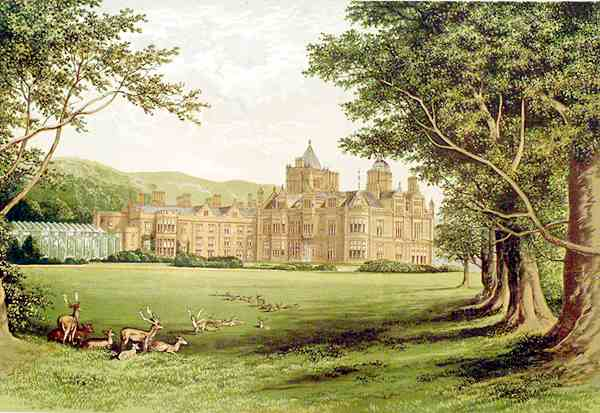
Holker Hall in 1880

Additions to the grounds were made during the 19th century and included an arboretum, a conservatory, terraces, and a walled garden. The conservatory was a large structure designed by Joseph Paxton, but has since been demolished.

The house was largely rebuilt in 1838–41 for the 7th Duke of Devonshire by George Webster of Kendal in Jacobean Revival style. In 1859–61 the Lancaster architect E. G. Paley carried out some minor alterations.

==== 1871 Fire and rebuilding ====
In 1871 the front (west) wing of the house was almost completely destroyed by fire. An estimated 103 works of art were lost and the more notable items were:

- Canaletto: Saint Mark’s Place during the Carnival
- Collier: A piece of wild life
- Holbein: a landscape
- Sir Godfrey Kneller: King William III; The first Duke of Devonshire in armour; The first Duchess of Devonshire, Mary, daughter of the Duke of Ormond
- Claude Lorrain: Two landscapes, both described as Landscape with three columns of the Temple of Jupiter Stator, story of Mercury and Battus
- Reade, after Sir Godfrey Kneller: Lady Lonsdale (Mary Lowther)
- Salvator Rosa: Two battle pieces
- Rosalvo: The Temple of Concord in ruins with figures
- Rubens: A landscape with people and cattle; Saint John
- David Teniers the Younger (or his father, son or grandson): Two Dutch sea pieces
- Peter Tillemans: St. Mary’s Abbey, Furness
- Jacob Isaacksz van Ruisdael (or Salomon van Ruysdael): Landscape with a cottage; Landscape with a cottage and windmill at a distance; Landscape
- Claude-Joseph Vernet (or his father or son): A sea piece in a fog

The Duke commissioned Paley again, together with Hubert Austin, (the firm was then known as Paley and Austin) to rebuild the wing. This they did on the same footprint, but on a grander scale, adding two towers, the whole being in Elizabethan Revival style. The estimated cost of this was about £38,000 (£2,800,000 as of 2014).

== Present use ==
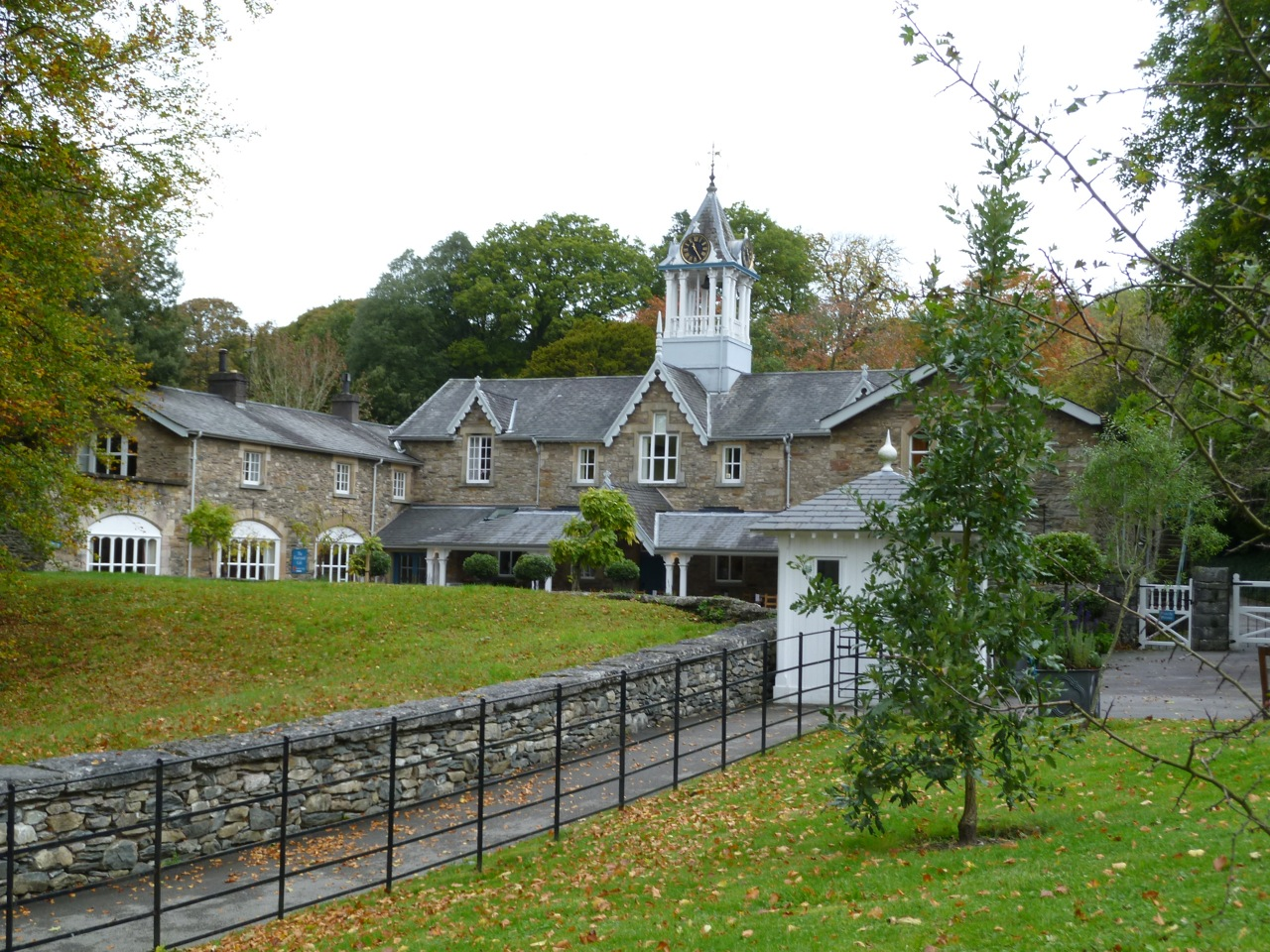
Former stable block, now a gift shop and café

The hall continues to be the home of Lord Cavendish and his wife. The older wing is used by the family and is not open to the public.

Paley and Austin's west wing and the gardens are open to the general public during the summer months, an admission charge being payable. The former stable buildings have been converted into a café and gift shop. A series of events are organised in the hall and grounds, including an annual garden festival. Other events are organized from time to time in the house and grounds.

== Art and architecture ==
=== House and furnishings ===
Webster's remaining wing is in roughcast stone with ashlar dressings and a slate roof. Paley and Austin's west wing is in variegated red sandstone. Its entrance front faces the east has a porch placed asymmetrically, which is flanked by turrets with domes and pinnacles. Behind the porch is a tower with a copper-covered ogee-shaped cupola, and to the right of this is another tower, which is broad and square with a lead-covered pyramidal roof.

At each end of the long central corridor in the old wing are spiral staircases, which are contained in semicircular projections. On one side of the corridor are rooms including a drawing room and a small dining room. On the other side are service rooms, and behind these is a courtyard. The contents of the wing include panelling removed from Canon Winder Hall, Flookburgh, a chimneypiece from Conishead Priory, and a pair of Baroque barley-sugar columns.

In the Paley and Austin wing, the entrance porch leads into a long hall, which opens into the library, the billiards room, the drawing room and the dining room; all of these rooms have elaborately decorated plaster ceilings. In the library are about 3,500 books, some of which survived the 1871 fire, and some of the former possessions of the scientist Henry Cavendish (1731–1810), including his microscope. On the walls of the billiards room are four painted panels that are attributed to Jean-Baptiste Oudry, a caricature by Joshua Reynolds, and paintings by Jan Wyck and Matthias Reed. The walls of the drawing room are lined in silk, and the room contains a Carrara marble fireplace. Paintings in the room are by Claude Joseph Vernet (its companion-piece was destroyed in the fire), Salvatore Rosa, and Douglas Anderson. The furniture in the dining room includes chairs by Thomas Chippendale. On the walls are portraits of family members, and a self-portrait by Anthony van Dyck. At the far end of the entrance hall is a cantilevered oak staircase which is approached through limestone arches. It contains over 100 balusters, each of which is carved with a different design. Its windows contain heraldic stained glass. The upper floor contains a gallery and four bedrooms. In the gallery are items of furniture, and these include a table with a purse once belonging to Georgiana Cavendish. Queen Mary's Bedroom gained its name when it was used by Queen Mary when she stayed in the house in 1937. The Wedgwood Bedroom contains a Carrera marble fireplace incorporating blue and white Wedgwood Jasperware. The four-poster bed is by Hepplewhite. The Gloucester Bedroom and Dressing Room gained their names when they were used by the Duke of Gloucester and his wife when they visited in 1939. The walls are decorated with engravings of Brighton Pavilion by John Nash. The Duke's Bedroom was used by the 7th Duke during the later years of his life.

=== Grounds ===
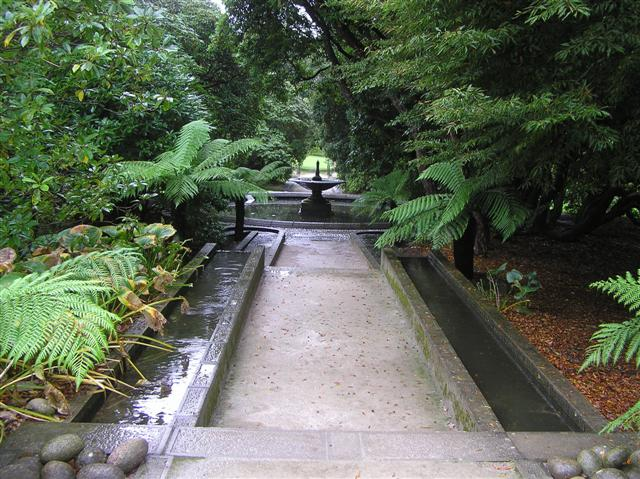
Cascade

The formal gardens comprise 10 hectares, and the surrounding parkland, deer park and woodland, comprise 80 hectares. The formal gardens are on the south and west sides of the house, and to the north and west are pleasure gardens with a winding path leading to and through the arboretum. The formal garden to the south of the west wing is known as the Elliptical Garden, and to the left of this is the Summer Garden. To the north-west of the hall is the Sunken Garden containing a pair of summer houses. The pleasure gardens include a cedar planted by Lord George Cavendish in the late 18th century, and an Auracaria planted in 1844. There are also two areas of kitchen gardens, one to the north-west of the hall, and the other to the north of the B5278 road. In 1901 Thomas Hayton Mawson worked on the gardens.

In 1910 Thomas Mawson redesigned the formal garden. His design included a terrace wall to the south-east of the hall. Since then there have been further developments. In 2003–04 a cascade, labyrinth and car park were added by Kim Wilkie, and a sundial by Mark Lennox-Boyd.

==== Holker Lime ====
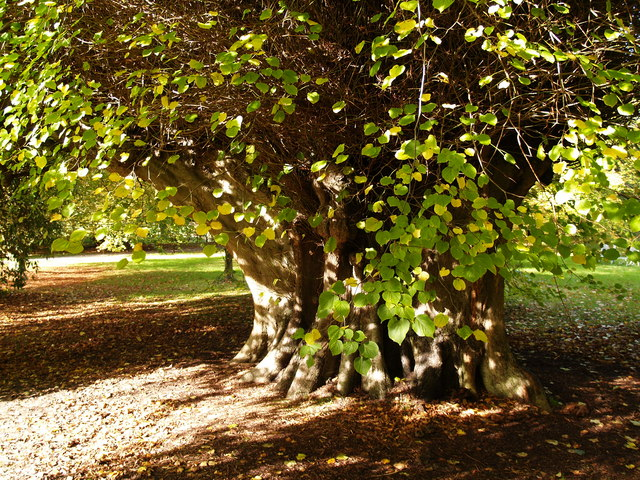
The Holker Lime

The Holker Lime, in the grounds, is regarded as one of the largest and finest common limes (Tilia × europaea) in Britain. It was planted in the early 17th century, probably as part of the establishment of the formal garden. Its girth is 7.9 metres (26 ft). It was designated by the Tree Council as one of the 50 Great British Trees in the United Kingdom, to mark the Golden Jubilee of Elizabeth II in 2002.

=== Grade II listed structures in the grounds ===
==== Ice house ====
To the west of the hall is a two-tier circular ice house, which has been present since at least 1732.

==== North lodge and gate ====
The north lodge with its gate piers, standing on the B5278 road, dates probably from the early 19th century and was possibly designed by George Webster. It is a single-story building in roughcast stone with ashlar dressings and slate roof. The gate piers are circular and rusticated with domed caps.

==== Stable buildings ====
To the south-east of the hall are stable buildings in a U-shaped plan, constructed in stone with slate roofs. They are dated 1864, and incorporate a timber bell turret with a pyramidal roof, a clock, and a weathervane.

==== South lodge ====
The south lodge, also on the B5278 road, is dated 1875 and was designed by Paley and Austin. It is a two-storey building with an L-plan, constructed in limestone with a slate roof.

==== Entrance gates ====
The entrance gates and associated railings to the hall itself, also on the B5278 road, date from about 1875, and were also designed by Paley and Austin.

==== Rysbrack statue of Inigo Jones, moved from Chiswick House ====
In the grounds to the north of the hall is a lead statue of Inigo Jones by John Michael Rysbrack, dating from about the 1740s; this was moved from Chiswick House in the 19th century.

==== Limestone underpass ====
Also in the grounds is a limestone underpass beneath the B5278 road that gave access from the formal gardens to the kitchen gardens.

== See also ==
- Grade II* listed buildings in Westmorland and Furness
- Listed buildings in Lower Holker
- List of works by George Webster
- List of non-ecclesiastical works by Paley and Austin
