= Brown atrophy of the heart =

Brown atrophy of the heart is atrophy of the heart muscle (or myocardium) commonly found in the elderly. It is described as brown because fibers become pigmented by intracellular deposits (mostly around the cell nucleus) of lipofuscin, a type of lipochrome granule.

It has no known effect on function, and is described as being expected or normal in aging.

== See also ==
- Atrophy (relating to all tissues, see Muscle atrophy for atrophy in muscle tissue).
- Xanthosis
