= Lower Holker =

Civil parish in Cumbria, England

Coordinates: 54.1743°N 2.9721°W

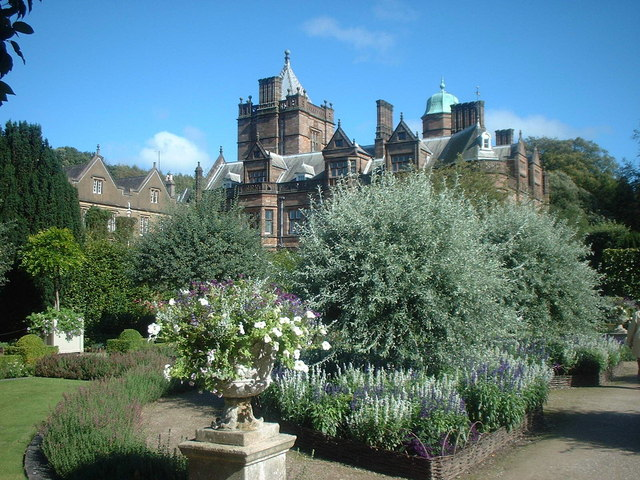
- Holker Hall

- Location within Cumbria
- Population: 1,869 (2011)
- OS grid reference: SD3677
- Civil parish: Lower Holker
- Unitary authority: Westmorland and Furness
- Ceremonial county: Cumbria
- Region: North West
- Country: England
- Sovereign state: United Kingdom
- Post town: GRANGE OVER SANDS
- Postcode district: LA11
- Dialling code: 01539
- Police: Cumbria
- Fire: Cumbria
- Ambulance: North West
- UK Parliament: Westmorland and Lonsdale

Lower Holker is a civil parish in the Westmorland and Furness district of the English county of Cumbria. It includes the villages of Cark and Flookburgh, the hamlets of Holker, Ravenstown and Sand Gate, and historic Holker Hall. In the 2001 census the parish had a population of 1,808, increasing at the 2011 census to 1,869.

In chronostratigraphy, the British sub-stage of the Carboniferous period, the 'Holkerian' derives its name from Holker Hall.

== See also ==
- Listed buildings in Lower Holker
