= Flookburgh =

Village in Cumbria, England

Coordinates: 54.174°N 2.972°W

- Village
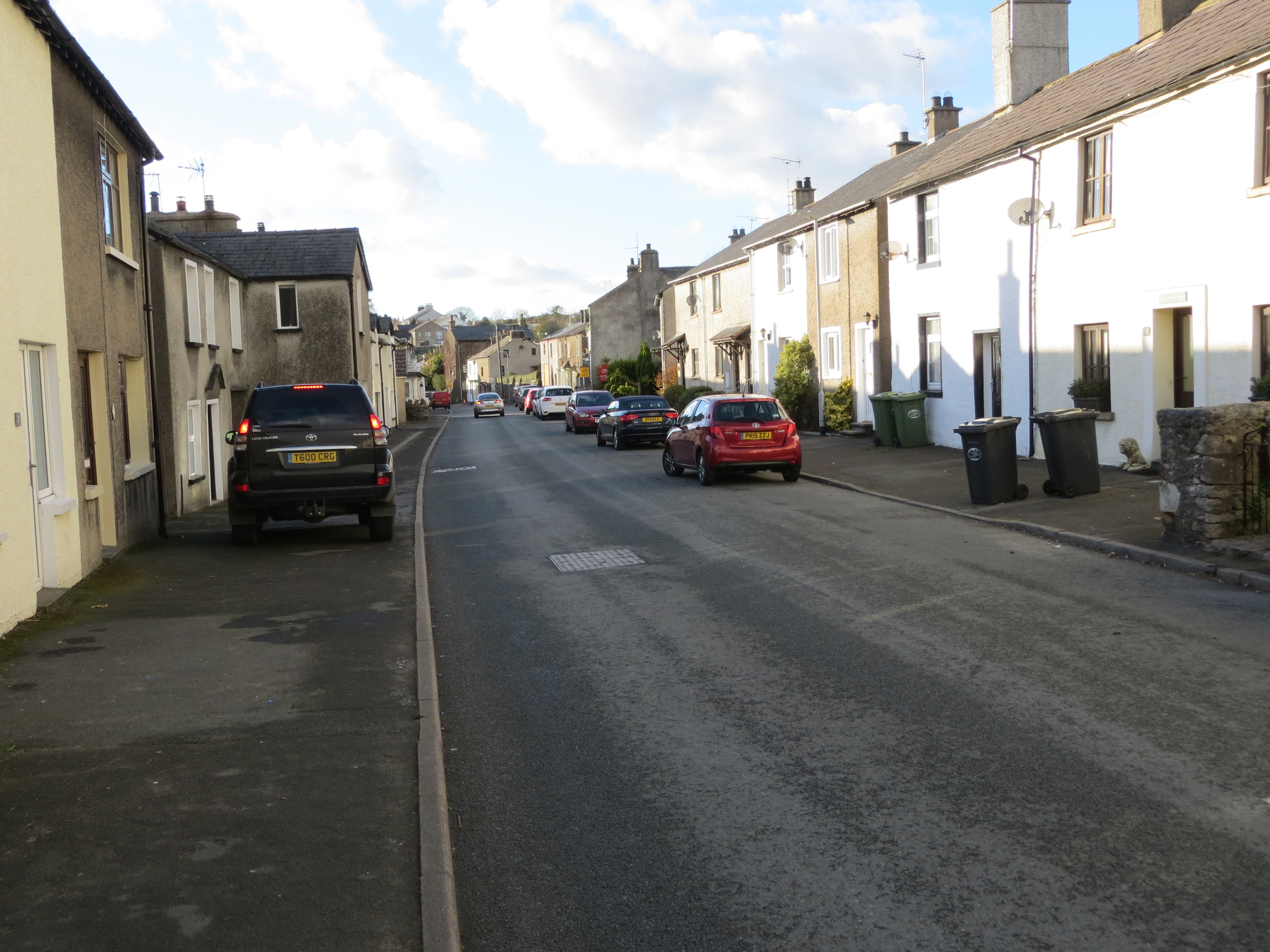
- Main Street, Flookburgh

- Location on Morecambe Bay Location within Cumbria
- OS grid reference: SD365758
- Civil parish: Lower Holker
- Unitary authority: Westmorland and Furness
- Ceremonial county: Cumbria
- Region: North West
- Country: England
- Sovereign state: United Kingdom
- Post town: Grange-Over-Sands
- Postcode district: LA11
- Dialling code: 015395
- Police: Cumbria
- Fire: Cumbria
- Ambulance: North West
- UK Parliament: Westmorland and Lonsdale

Flookburgh is an ancient village on the Cartmel peninsula in Cumbria, England. Within the boundaries of the historic county of Lancashire and being close to Morecambe Bay, cockle and shrimp fishing plays a big part in village life. Flookburgh has a Haven Holidays site called Lakeland Leisure Park.

Flookburgh is sometimes thought to derive its name from a flat fish, known as the Fluke, found in the area. (Many people in Flookburgh say, in fact, that Flookburgh wasn't named after the Fluke; the Fluke was named after the village.) However, it is far more likely that the name is Norse, an adaptation of 'Flugga's Town'.

== Location ==
Flookburgh is located 3.2 miles (5.1 km) away from the nearest town, Grange-over-Sands. Travelling by road, it is 16.8 miles (27.0 km) to the south of Kendal, 11.7 miles (18.8 km) to the east of Ulverston, 21.9 miles (35.2 km) to the east of Barrow-in-Furness and 31.3 miles (50.4 km) to the west of Lancaster.

== Governance ==
Flookburgh is part of the Westmorland and Lonsdale parliamentary constituency, of which Tim Farron is the current MP representing the Liberal Democrats.

For local government purposes, it is in the Grange and Cartmel ward of Westmorland and Furness and Lower Holker civil parish.

== Stan Laurel connection ==
Hollywood film comedian Stan Laurel was a regular visitor to Flookburgh as a child. His uncle and auntie, John and Nant Shaw, ran the village's co-operative store and Laurel and his grandmother, Sarah Metcalfe, would catch the train from Ulverston, where Laurel was born in 1890, to visit them. Laurel would play with his numerous cousins during his excursions to Flookburgh.

== See also ==
- Listed buildings in Lower Holker
- Haven Holidays
