= List of churches in South Lakeland =

The following is a list of churches in the former South Lakeland district in Cumbria. This area is now part of the Westmorland and Furness unitary authority area.

The following civil parishes have no active churches: Angerton, Blawith and Subberthwaite, Docker, Fawcett Forest, Lambrigg, Mansriggs, Nether Staveley, Preston Richard, Sedgwick, Strickland Roger and Whinfell.

The former district has an estimated 147 churches for 104,000 inhabitants, a ratio of one church for every 707 people.

== Map of medieval parish churches ==
For the purposes of this map medieval is taken to be pre-1485. It is of note that Cumbria, unlike most parts of England, saw a sustained programme of church building during the 16th and 17th centuries as the more remote parts of the district were settled.

Medieval parish churches in South Lakeland

== List ==
Name	Civil parish (settlement)	Dedication	Web	Founded	Denomination	Benefice	Notes
St Cuthbert, Aldingham	Aldingham	Cuthbert		Medieval	Church of England	Urswick etc	
St Matthew, Dendron	Aldingham (Dendron)	Matthew		1642	Church of England	Urswick etc	Rebuilt 1795
St James, Arnside	Arnside	James		1866	Church of England		
Our Lady of Lourdes, Arnside	Arnside	Mary		1926	Roman Catholic	Kent Estuary Catholic Parish	Current building 1977
Arnside Methodist Church	Arnside			1876	Methodist	Kendal Circuit	
St Bartholomew, Barbon	Barbon	Bartholomew		Medieval	Church of England	Rainbow Parish	Rebuilt 1893
St Michael & All Angels, Beetham	Beetham	Michael & Angels		Medieval	Church of England		
Storth Village Church	Beetham (Storth)				CoE / Methodist	Kendal Circuit	2006 merger of Methodist church and Anglican mission church
St Peter, Field Broughton	Broughton East (Field Broughton)	Peter		1745	Church of England	Cartmel Peninsula	Own parish 1875. Rebuilt 1892-1894
St Mary Magdalene, Broughton-in-Furness	Broughton West	Mary Magdalene		Medieval	Church of England	Broughton & Duddon	Benefice also includes one church in Copeland
Broughton-in-Furness Methodist Church	Broughton West				Methodist	SW Cumbria United Area	
Holy Innocents, Broughton Mills	Broughton West (Broughton Mills)	Innocents		1888	Church of England	Broughton & Duddon	
St James, Burton	Burton-in-Kendal	James		Medieval	Church of England	Burton & Holme	
St Anthony, Cartmel Fell	Cartmel Fell	Anthony the Great		1504	Church of England	Two Valleys Team	
Holy Trinity, Casterton	Casterton	Trinity		1833	Church of England	Rainbow Parish	
St Peter, Far Sawrey	Claife (Sawrey)	Peter		1869	Church of England	Hawkshead Benefice	Own parish from Hawkshead 1873
Holy Trinity, Colton	Colton	Trinity		1578	Church of England	Egton, Lowick & Colton	
St Paul, Rusland	Colton (Rusland)	Paul		1745	Church of England	Hawkshead Benefice	Rebuilt 1868
Tottlebank Baptist Church	Colton (Tottlebank)			1669	Baptist Union		Current building 1697
St Peter, Finsthwaite	Colton (Finsthwaite)	Peter		1724	Church of England	Cartmel Peninsula	Rebuilt 1873-1874
St Andrew, Coniston	Coniston	Andrew		1586	Church of England	Coniston & Torver	Rebuilt 1819
Coniston Methodist Church	Coniston				Methodist	South Lakes Circuit	
Coniston Christian Fellowship	Coniston			1986	Independent		EA. Meets in Coniston primary school
St Catherine, Crook	Crook	Catherine of Alex.		1620	Church of England	Two Valleys Team	Rebuilt 1886
Holy Trinity, Winster	Crook (Winster)	Trinity		C16th	Church of England	Two Valleys Team	Rebuilt 1874-1875
St Mary, Crosthwaite	Crosthwaite & Lyth	Mary		Medieval	Church of England	Two Valleys Team	Rebuilt 1878
St Andrew, Dent	Dent	Andrew		Medieval	Church of England	Dent with Cowgill	
St John the Evangelist, Cowgill	Dent (Cowgill)	John the Evangelist		1838	Church of England	Dent with Cowgill	
Dentdale Methodist Church	Dent				Methodist	Sedbergh Circuit	
Dentfoot Methodist Church	Dent (Dent Foot)				Methodist	Sedbergh Circuit	
Holy Trinity, Seathwaite	Dunnerdale-with-Seathwaite	Trinity		C16th	Church of England	Broughton & Duddon	Rebuilt 1875
St Mary the Virgin, Penny Bridge	Egton with Newland	Mary		pre-1786	Church of England	Egton, Lowick & Colton	Rebuilt 1831
St John the Evangelist, Firbank	Firbank	John the Evangelist		1842	Church of England	Lune United Benefice	
St John the Baptist, Garsdale	Garsdale	John the Baptist		1861	Church of England	Sedbergh, Cautley, Garsdale	
Garsdale Methodist Church	Garsdale				Methodist	Sedbergh Circuit	
Garsdale Street Methodist Church	Garsdale				Methodist	Sedbergh Circuit	
Hawes Junction Methodist Church	Garsdale (Garsdale Head)				Methodist	Sedbergh Circuit	Occasional services only
St Paul, Grange-over-Sands	Grange-over-Sands	Paul		1852-1854	Church of England	Cartmel Peninsula	
Grange Fell Church	Grange-over-Sands			1906-1907	Church of England	Cartmel Peninsula	
SS Charles Borromeo & Cuthbert, Grange	Grange-over-Sands	Charles B & Cuthbert			Roman Catholic	Kent Estuary Catholic Parish	
Grange Methodist Church	Grange-over-Sands				Methodist	South Lakes Circuit	
Grange United Reformed Church	Grange-over-Sands				URC	South Lakes Church	
Hope Church Grange-over-Sands	Grange-over-Sands			2009	Newfrontiers		
St John, Grayrigg	Grayrigg	John the Evangelist		pre-C18th	Church of England	Beacon Team	Rebuilt 1837-1838
St Anne, Haverthwaite	Haverthwaite	Anne		1824-1825	Church of England	Cartmel Peninsula	Own parish from Colton 1866
St Michael & All Angels, Hawkshead	Hawkshead	Michael & Angels		Medieval	Church of England	Hawkshead Benefice	
Hawkshead Methodist Church	Hawkshead				Methodist	South Lakes Circuit	
Hawkshead Hill Baptist Church	Hawkshead (Hawkshead Hill)			1678	Baptist Union		
St John, Helsington	Helsington	John the Evangelist		1726	Church of England	Two Valleys Team	
St Peter, Heversham	Heversham	Peter		Medieval	Church of England	Heversham & Milnthorpe	
Hincaster Mission Room	Hincaster				Church of England		Possibly defunct
Holy Trinity, Holme	Holme	Trinity		1839	Church of England	Burton & Holme	Own parish 1864
St Anne, Ings	Hugill (Ings)	Anne		C16th	Church of England	Staveley, Ings & Kentmere	Current building 1743
St John the Divine, Hutton Roof	Hutton Roof	John the Evangelist		Medieval	Church of England	Rainbow Parish	Rebuilt 1757, 1881
Holy Trinity, Kendal	Kendal	Trinity		Medieval	Church of England	Helm Group	
St George, Kendal	Kendal	George		1754	Church of England	Beacon Team	Current building & parish church 1841. Commissioners' church
St Thomas, Kendal	Kendal	Thomas		1835-1837	Church of England	Kendal St Thomas	
Hallgarth Community Church	Kendal				?		
Holy Trinity & St George, Kendal	Kendal	Trinity & George		1793	Roman Catholic	Kendal Catholic Parish	Current building 1835-1837
Stricklandgate Methodist Church	Kendal			1787	Methodist	Kendal Circuit	
Fellside Methodist Church	Kendal				Methodist	Kendal Circuit	
Sandylands Methodist Church	Kendal				Methodist	Kendal Circuit	
Kendal United Reformed Church	Kendal			C17th	URC	South Lakes Church	
Parr Street Evangelical Church	Kendal				FIEC		Affinity
Heron Hill Free Church	Kendal				Independent		
Kendal Salvation Army	Kendal				Salvation Army		
Kendal Quaker Meeting	Kendal				Quakers	Kendal & Sedbergh Quakers	
King's Church Kendal	Kendal	Jesus			Newfrontiers		
St Cuthbert, Kentmere	Kentmere	Cuthbert		Medieval	Church of England	Staveley, Ings & Kentmere	
All Saints, Killington	Killington	All Saints			Church of England	Lune United Benefice	
St Cuthbert, Kirkby Ireleth	Kirkby Ireleth	Cuthbert		Medieval	Church of England		
Kirkby Marshside Methodist Church	Kirkby Ireleth			late C18th	Methodist	SW Cumbria United Area	Current building 1870
St John the Evangelist, Woodland	Kirkby Ireleth (Woodland)	John the Evangelist		1698	Church of England	Broughton & Duddon	Rebuilt 1822, 1864-1865
St Mary the Virgin, Kirkby Lonsdale	Kirkby Lonsdale	Mary		Medieval	Church of England	Rainbow Parish	
St Joseph, Kirkby Lonsdale	Kirkby Lonsdale	Joseph		1966	Roman Catholic		
Kirkby Lonsdale Methodist Church	Kirkby Lonsdale				Methodist	Kendal Circuit	
St Oswald, Grasmere	Lakes (Grasmere)	Oswald of N'umbria		Medieval	CoE / Methodist	Grasmere & Rydal	
Holy Trinity, Langdale	Lakes (Chapel Stile)	Trinity		Medieval	Church of England	Loughrigg Team	Current building 1858, own parish 1863
Jesus Church, Troutbeck	Lakes (Troutbeck)	Jesus		1562	Church of England	Windermere & Troutbeck	Rebuilt 1736
St Mary, Rydal	Lakes (Rydal)	Mary		1823-1825	Church of England	Grasmere & Rydal	
Little Langdale Mission Chapel	Lakes (Little Langdale)			C19th	Church of England	Loughrigg Team	
St Mary, Ambleside	Lakes (Ambleside)	Mary		1850-1854	Church of England	Loughrigg Team	Earlier chapel of St Anne, own burial rights C17th
Mater Amabilis, Ambleside	Lakes (Ambleside)	Mary			Roman Catholic	Windermere Parish	
Our Lady of the Wayside, Grasmere	Lakes (Grasmere)	Mary			Roman Catholic	Windermere Parish	
Ambleside Baptist Church	Lakes (Ambleside)				Baptist Union		
Ambleside Methodist Church	Lakes (Ambleside)				Methodist	South Lakes Circuit	Shares a building with St Mary's Anglican church
St John the Evangelist, Levens	Levens	John the Evangelist		1828	Church of England		
Levens Methodist Church	Levens				Methodist	Kendal Circuit	
St Mary, Longsleddale	Longsleddale	Mary		1712	Church of England	Beacon Team	Current building 1863
SS Mary & Michael Priory Church, Cartmel	Lower Allithwaite (Cartmel)	Mary & Michael		Medieval	Church of England	Cartmel Peninsula	Survived Dissolution by being deemed a parish church
Cartmel Methodist Church	Lower Allithwaite (Cartmel)			C19th	Methodist	South Lakes Circuit	Current building 1871-1872
St Mary, Allithwaite	Lower Allithwaite (Allithwaite)	Mary		1864-1865	Church of England	Cartmel Peninsula	
St John the Baptist, Flookburgh	Lower Holker (Flookburgh)	John the Baptist		1777	Church of England	Cartmel Peninsula	Own parish 1879. Rebuilt 1897-1900
St Luke, Lowick	Lowick	Luke		1577	CoE / Methodist	Egton, Lowick & Colton	
All Saints, Lupton	Lupton	All Saints		1867	Church of England	Rainbow Parish	
St Peter, Mansergh	Mansergh	Peter		1726	Church of England	Rainbow Parish	Rebuilt 1880
Holy Ghost, Middleton	Middleton	Holy Spirit		1634	Church of England	Rainbow Parish	Rebuilt 1879
St Thomas, Milnthorpe	Milnthorpe	Thomas		1837	Church of England	Heversham & Milnthorpe	
Christ the King, Milnthorpe	Milnthorpe	Jesus		1947	Roman Catholic	Kent Estuary Catholic Parish	Current building 1970
M:OASIS	Milnthorpe				Methodist	Kendal Circuit	Previously Milnthorpe Methodist, gave up building 2014
Trinity Church Milnthorpe	Milnthorpe	Trinity		2016	FIEC		Affinity. Plant from Parr Street Evangelical, Kendal
St Mark, Natland	Natland	Mark		Medieval	Church of England	Helm Group	Rebuilt 1735, 1825, 1909-1910 and renamed
St Stephen, New Hutton	New Hutton	Stephen		C18th	Church of England	Helm Group	Rebuilt 1829
St John the Baptist, Old Hutton	Old Hutton & Holmescales	John the Baptist		1873	Church of England	Helm Group	
St John the Evangelist, Osmotherley	Osmotherley	John the Evangelist		1873-1874	Church of England	Ulverston	
St James, Staveley	Over Staveley	James		1865	Church of England	Staveley, Ings & Kentmere	Replaced dilapidated St Margaret's (medieval) in village centre
St Michael & the Holy Angels, Pennington	Pennington	Michael & Angels		Medieval	Church of England	Pennington, Lindal, Bardsea	Rebuilt 1826
Swarthmoor Methodist Church	Pennington (Swarthmoor)			1864	Methodist	South Lakes Circuit	
St Patrick, Preston Patrick	Preston Patrick	Patrick		1509	Church of England	Rainbow Parish	Rebuilt 1852
Preston Patrick Quaker Meeting	Preston Patrick			1691	Quakers	Kendal & Sedbergh Quakers	
All Saints, Satterthwaite	Satterthwaite	All Saints		C16th	Church of England	Hawkshead Benefice	Current building c. 1840. Own parish from Hawkshead 1881
St Andrew, Sedbergh	Sedbergh	Andrew		Medieval	Church of England	Sedbergh, Cautley, Garsdale	
Sedbergh Catholic Meeting	Sedbergh				Roman Catholic	Kendal Catholic Parish	Meets in St Andrew's Anglican church
New Street Methodist Church, Sedbergh	Sedbergh				Methodist	Sedbergh Circuit	
Sedbergh United Reformed Church	Sedbergh				URC	South Lakes Church	
Brigflatts Meeting House	Sedbergh (Brigflatts)			1652	Quakers	Kendal & Sedbergh Quakers	
Holy Trinity, Howgill	Sedbergh (Howgill)	Trinity		1838	Church of England	Lune United Benefice	
St Mark, Cautley	Sedbergh (Cautley)	Mark		1847	Church of England	Sedbergh, Cautley, Garsdale	
Cautley Methodist Church	Sedbergh (Cautley)				Methodist	Sedbergh Circuit	
St John the Baptist, Skelsmergh	Skelsmergh & Scalthwaiterigg	John the Baptist		1871	Church of England	Beacon Team	
Holy Trinity, Brathay	Skelwith (Clappersgate)	Trinity		1836	Church of England	Loughrigg Team	
St Thomas, Crosscrake	Stainton (Crosscrake)	Thomas		Medieval	Church of England	Helm Group	Rebuilt 1874
St Mary, Staveley-in-Cartmel	Staveley-in-Cartmel	Mary		1537	Church of England	Cartmel Peninsula	Restored 1897
Hebron Hall	Staveley-in-Cartmel (Backbarrow)	Hebron		1913	Gospel Hall		
St Oswald, Burneside	Strickland Ketel (Burneside)	Oswald of N'umbria		1602	Church of England	Beacon Team	Rebuilt 1881
St Luke, Torver	Torver	Luke		1849	Church of England	Coniston & Torver	Rebuilt 1884 and dedicated to St Luke
St Mary, Ulverston	Ulverston	Mary		Medieval	Church of England	Ulverston	Mostly rebuilt 1864-1866
St Mary of Furness, Ulverston	Ulverston	Mary		1824	Roman Catholic	Ulverston & Dalston	Current building 1893-1895
Ulverston Methodist Church	Ulverston			late C18th	Methodist	South Lakes Circuit	Current building 1818
Bethany Christian Church	Ulverston	Bethany			Gospel Hall		
Ulverston Grace Baptist Church	Ulverston			1992	Independent		Affinity. Plant from Free Grace Baptist, Lancaster
Croftlands Community Church	Ulverston				Independent		
Emmanuel Christian Centre	Ulverston	Jesus		1876	CCI		Previously Churches of Christ then Assemblies of God
All Saints, Underbarrow	Underbarrow & Bradleyfield	All Saints		Medieval	Church of England	Two Valleys Team	
St Paul, Lindale	Lindale and Newton-in-Cartmel (Lindale)	Paul		Medieval	Church of England	Cartmel Peninsula	Rebuilt 1828
Holy Trinity, Bardsea	Urswick (Bardsea)	Trinity		1843-1853	Church of England	Pennington, Lindal, Bardsea	Benefice also includes one church in Barrow-in-Furness
SS Mary Virgin & Michael, Urswick	Urswick	Mary & Michael		Medieval	Church of England	Urswick etc	Benefice also includes one church in Barrow-in-Furness
Urswick United Reformed Church	Urswick				URC	SW Cumbria United Area	
St Thomas, Selside	Whitwell & Selside	Thomas		1709	Church of England	Beacon Team	Rebuilt 1838
St Mary, Windermere	Windermere	Mary		1847-1848	Church of England	Windermere & Troutbeck	Own parish 1856
Our Lady of Windermere & St Herbert	Windermere	Mary & Herbert of D			Roman Catholic	Windermere Parish	
Windermere Methodist Church	Windermere				Methodist	South Lakes Circuit	
Carver Uniting Church, Windermere	Windermere				Methodist / URC		
Windermere Community Church	Windermere				Assemblies of God		Moved into Heathwaite Mission building 2001
St Martin, Windermere	Windermere (Bowness)	Martin of Tours		Medieval	Church of England		Own parish 1348
Lakes Christian Centre	Windermere (Bowness)			1924	Independent		EA. Began in Langdale
St Paul, Witherslack	Witherslack, Meathop & Ulpha	Paul		1669-1671	Church of England	Two Valleys Team	

== Defunct churches ==
Name	Civil parish (settlement)	Dedication	Web	Founded	Redundant	Denomination	Notes
St John the Baptist, Blawith	Blawith & Subberthwaite	John the Baptist		1862-1863	1988	Church of England	
St Margaret of Antioch, Low Wray	Claife (Low Wray)	Margaret the Virgin		1845		Church of England	
All Hallows Chapel, Kendal	Kendal	All Saints				Church of England	
St Margaret, Staveley	Over Staveley	Margaret the Virgin		Medieval	C19th	Church of England	Replaced by St James's (see above)
St Leonard, Swarthmoor	Pennington (Swarthmoor)	Leonard of Noblac		1882		Church of England	
Graythwaite Mission Room	Satterthwaite (Graythwaite)					Church of England	
Holy Trinity, Ulverston	Ulverston	Trinity		1829-1832	1976	Church of England	
Sandside Gospel Hall	Kirkby Ireleth				2010	Gospel Hall	
