= High Newton =

Village in Cumbria, England

Coordinates: 54.238°N 2.919°W

- The Crown public house, now called Heft High Newton

- Location in South Lakeland Location within Cumbria
- OS grid reference: SD401828
- Civil parish: Lindale and Newton-in-Cartmel
- Unitary authority: Westmorland and Furness
- Ceremonial county: Cumbria
- Region: North West
- Country: England
- Sovereign state: United Kingdom
- Post town: GRANGE-OVER-SANDS
- Postcode district: LA11
- Dialling code: 015395
- Police: Cumbria
- Fire: Cumbria
- Ambulance: North West
- UK Parliament: Westmorland and Lonsdale

High Newton is a village in the civil parish of Lindale and Newton-in-Cartmel, in the Westmorland and Furness Unitary Authority, in the ceremonial county of Cumbria, England.

== By-pass ==
Formerly, the village was bisected by the A590 road until a bypass of the village and its neighbour Low Newton was completed. It opened on Tuesday 8 April 2008.

== Nearby settlements ==
Nearby settlements include the town of Grange-over-Sands, the villages of Lindale, Low Newton and Newby Bridge and the hamlets of Ayside, Field Broughton and Barber Green.

== See also ==
- Listed buildings in Lindale and Newton-in-Cartmel
