= Staveley-in-Cartmel =

Village and civil parish in Cumbria, England

Coordinates: 54.267222°N 2.953056°W

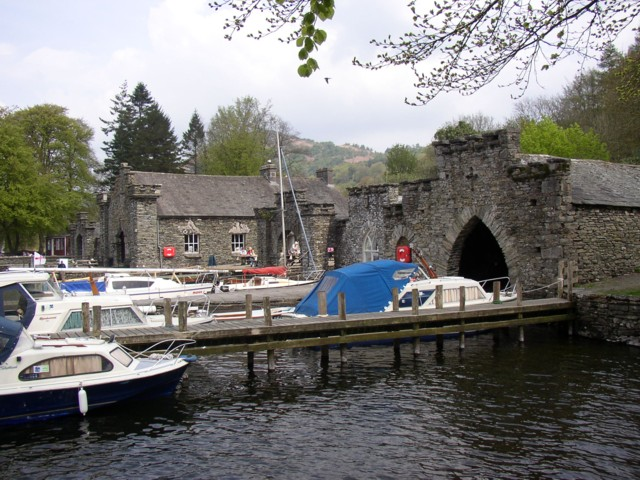
- Boathouses, Fell Foot Park, Staveley-in-Cartmel

- Location in South Lakeland Location within Cumbria
- Population: 405 (2011)
- OS grid reference: SD379861
- Civil parish: Staveley-in-Cartmel
- Unitary authority: Westmorland and Furness
- Ceremonial county: Cumbria
- Region: North West
- Country: England
- Sovereign state: United Kingdom
- Post town: ULVERSTON
- Postcode district: LA12
- Dialling code: 015395
- Police: Cumbria
- Fire: Cumbria
- Ambulance: North West
- UK Parliament: Westmorland and Lonsdale

Staveley-in-Cartmel is a village and civil parish in Westmorland and Furness unitary authority area, Cumbria, England. It lies east of Newby Bridge, near the south end of Windermere, 9 miles (14 km) northeast of Ulverston. It is sometimes known as Staveley-in-Furness. Both names distinguish it from another Staveley in Cumbria. The parish includes Ayside, Barber Green, Seatle and part of Newby Bridge. In the 2001 census the parish had a population of 428, decreasing at the 2011 census to 405.

== History ==
Within the boundaries of the historic county of Lancashire, when local government underwent reorganisation in 1974 it was named "in Cartmel" to distinguish it from the other Staveley, which is also called Staveley-in-Westmorland or Staveley-in-Kendal to ensure that they are differentiated. On 1 November 1979 the civil parish was renamed from "Staveley" to "Staveley in Cartmel". It gives its name to an electoral ward which elects one councillor to South Lakeland district council, and the village has a parish council.

In 1831, Samuel Lewis noted that it contained 350 inhabitants, saying "the living is a perpetual curacy, in the archdeaconry of Richmond, and Diocese of Chester, endowed with £800 royal bounty, and in the patronage of Lord G. Cavendish." John Marius Wilson's Imperial Gazetteer of England and Wales (1870–72) states the population at the time to have been 409 people living in 76 houses and covering 2,480 acres, and that the manor belonged to the Duke of Devonshire.

== Governance ==
An electoral ward in the same name exists. The wards stretches south to Field Broughton and has a total population taken from the 2011 Census of 1,991. There is a parish council. From 1974 until 2023 it was in South Lakeland district.

== Geography ==
The neighbouring parishes are Windermere to the north west, Cartmel Fell to the north and north east, Lindale and Newton-in-Cartmel to the south east, Broughton East and Lower Allithwaite to the south, and Haverthwaite to the south west. The A590 road from Kendal to Barrow-in-Furness runs across the parish; at Newby Bridge the A592 road branches off and heads north towards Bowness.

== Landmarks ==
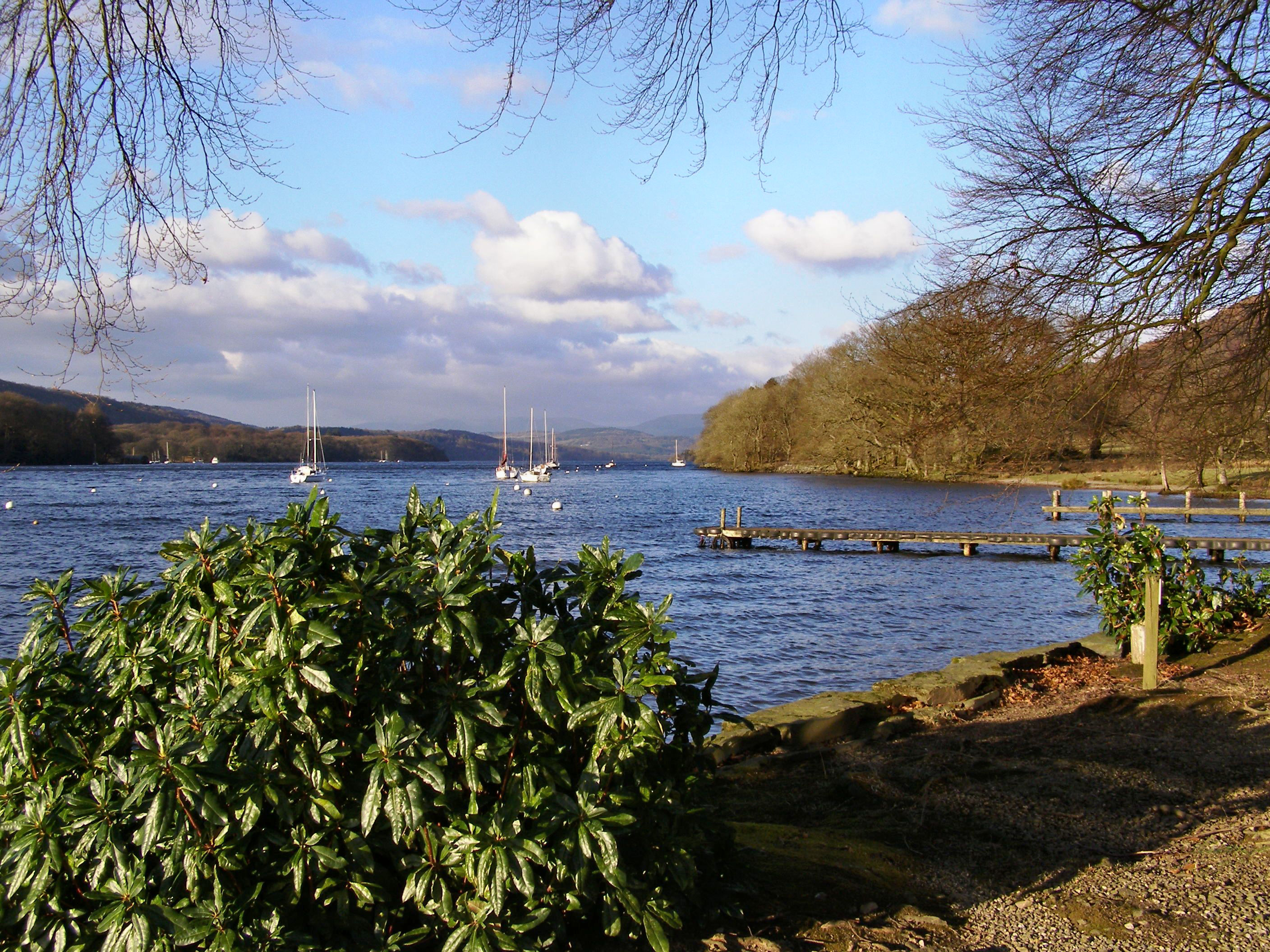
View of Windermere from Fell Foot Park

The parish church is the Church of St Mary, in the Windermere deanery of the Diocese of Carlisle. The church was built by 1618 and extended or restored in 1678, 1793, and 1896–97. Since 1976 the church has formed part of the United Benefice of Leven Valley, along with those of Finsthwaite and Haverthwaite. At the furthest south east shore of the lake can be found Fell Foot Park, owned by the National Trust. Also of note is Fell Foot House (demolished) and neighbouring Town Head House, and several very old farms. 4 miles away is Buck Crag, which was once the residence of Edmund Law, curate of Staveley-in-Cartmel and local teacher. Two endowed schools respectively for boys and girls were recorded in the early 1870s. To the east is Simpson Ground Reservoir. There are 23 listed buildings and structures in the parish; the bridge over the River Leven at Newby Bridge, which was repaired in the 17th century, is grade II* listed, and the others grade II.

Alfred Wainwright identifies the upland to the north east of the village as Staveley Fell, although this name does not appear on Ordnance Survey maps. He describes a walk there in his The Outlying Fells of Lakeland.

== See also ==
- Listed buildings in Staveley-in-Cartmel
