= Low Newton =

Low Newton may refer to:

- Low Newton, Cumbria, a village located on the Cartmel Peninsula in Cumbria, England
- Low Newton-by-the-Sea, a village located in the district of Alnwick in Northumberland, England
- HM Prison Low Newton, a women's prison located in the village of Brasside in County Durham, England
