= Low Newton, Cumbria =

Hamlet in Cumbria, England

Coordinates: 54.232°N 2.913°W

Low Newton
- Yew Tree Barn, Low Newton

- Location in South Lakeland Location within Cumbria
- OS grid reference: SD404822
- Civil parish: Lindale and Newton-in-Cartmel
- Unitary authority: Westmorland and Furness
- Ceremonial county: Cumbria
- Region: North West
- Country: England
- Sovereign state: United Kingdom
- Post town: GRANGE-OVER-SANDS
- Postcode district: LA11
- Dialling code: 015395
- Police: Cumbria
- Fire: Cumbria
- Ambulance: North West
- UK Parliament: Westmorland and Lonsdale

Low Newton (originally Nether Newton) is a hamlet in the Westmorland and Furness Unitary Authority, in the county of Cumbria, England and in the Lake District also commonly known as The Lakes. It was on the A590 road until along with its neighbour High Newton a bypass was built, opening on Tuesday 8 April 2008.

Nearby settlements include the town of Grange-over-Sands, the villages of Lindale, High Newton, Cartmel and Newby Bridge and the hamlets of Barber Green, Ayside and High Hampsfield.

The hamlet contains two Grade: II Listed Buildings, probably from the 18th Century, Fell Cottage and East View (see English Heritage).

There is one Bed & Breakfast, Ellenboro House B&B, situated in a traditional 19th Century Lake District house.

Yew Tree Barn houses architectural & interior antiques, whilst The Gallery has high quality art and design-led crafts, gifts and interiors, along with artisan studios.

Blackheath Moss Beck runs through the hamlet, starting south of High Newton.

== Transport ==
Low Newton is on the X6 bus route which runs from Kendal to Barrow-in-Furness via Grange-over-Sands. Grange-over-Sands railway station has connections to Ulverston and Barrow-in-Furness to the west, and Lancaster, Preston and Manchester (and its airport) to the east.

== See also ==
- Listed buildings in Lindale and Newton-in-Cartmel
