= Ridehalgh =

Ridehalgh or Ridealgh is a surname. Notable people with the surname include:

- Arthur Ridehalgh (1907–1971), British lawyer and attorney general of Hong Kong
- George Ridehalgh (1835–1892), English businessman
- Judith Constance Mary Ridehalgh, later Judith Hart, British politician
- Liam Ridehalgh (born 1991), British footballer
- Mabel Ridealgh (1898–1989), British politician

== See also ==
- Sagar v Ridehalgh & Sons Ltd, 1931 UK labour law case
