= Listed buildings in Staveley-in-Cartmel =

Staveley-in-Cartmel is a civil parish in the Westmorland and Furness Unitary Authority of Cumbria, England. It contains 22 listed buildings that are recorded in the National Heritage List for England. Of these, one is listed at Grade II*, the middle of the three grades, and the others are at Grade II, the lowest grade. The parish is in the Lake District National Park. It contains the villages of Staveley-in-Cartmel and Newby Bridge, and smaller settlements, but is mainly rural. In the parish is Fell Foot Park, a country park on the shore of Windermere; four buildings in this park have been listed. The other listed buildings include farmhouses, farm buildings, other houses, a milestone, a bridge, a church, and a sundial in the churchyard.

== Key ==
| Grade | Criteria |
|---|---|
| II* | Particularly important buildings of more than special interest |
| II | Buildings of national importance and special interest |

== Buildings ==
| Name and location | Photograph | Date | Notes | Grade |
|---|---|---|---|---|
| St Mary's Church; 54.26529°N 2.95435°W | | Before 1618 | The church was repaired in 1678, the tower and south aisle were added in about 1793, and the church was restored by Austin and Paley in 1897. It is built in stone, the south front is slate-hung, and the roof is slated. The church consists of a nave and a chancel in one vessel, a south aisle, and a west tower with a lean-to vestry to the south. The tower has a moulded doorway with a pointed arch, a clock face on the north side, and at the top is a projecting embattled parapet with crocketed pinnacles. The windows along the side have round heads. | II |
| Yewtree Farmhouse; 54.23612°N 2.92967°W | — | 1630 | The farmhouse is in roughcast stone with a slate roof. There are two storeys, six bays, two outshuts at the rear, one a stair wing, and a slate-hung wing between them. On the front is a gabled porch, some windows are casements, and some are sashes. | II |
| Fiddler Hall South and outbuilding 54.25392°N 2.94678°W | — | 1639 | The house is in roughcast stone with a slate roof, two storeys and three bays, with two projecting bays at the rear. On the front is a gabled porch, and the windows are casements. The outbuilding to the right is in stone, and has a pitching hole and a lean-to shed. | II |
| Fair Rigg Farmhouse and barn 54.25510°N 2.95210°W | — | Late 17th century | The farmhouse is in roughcast stone with a slate roof. There are two storeys, five bays, the fifth bay shallower and wider, and a rear single-story wing. On the front is a gabled porch, a French window in the fifth bay, casement windows in the other ground floor bays, and above are four sash windows and one casement window. The barn is in stone and contains paired doors, a cow house door, and ventilation slits. | II |
| High Cark Hall; 54.23351°N 2.95298°W | — | Late 17th century | A roughcast stone farmhouse with a slate roof. It has two storeys, four bays, with two lower bays to the left and a lean-to extension, and a rear gabled wing. The windows on the front are cross-mullioned, and above the doorway is a decorated and initialled lintel. At the rear are casement windows and a stair window. | II |
| Barrow Fold; 54.26736°N 2.95591°W | — | 17th or early 18th century | A roughcast house with a slate roof, two storeys, four bays, and a rear wing. On the front is a gabled porch. In the first bay is a bow window, in the fourth bay is a stair window, and elsewhere the windows vary. | II |
| Fair Rigg Cottage; 54.25516°N 2.95342°W | — | Late 17th or 18th century | A roughcast stone house with a slate roof. There are two storeys with an attic, four bays, and a continuous outshut at the rear. On the front is a gabled porch with an entrance on the side, the windows are of varying types, and at the rear is a stair window. At the right is an outbuilding. | II |
| Seatle Farmhouse and barn 54.24051°N 2.95395°W | — | Early 18th century | The house and barn are in stone, the house roughcast, with slate roofs. The house has two storeys, four bays, the right two bays lower, and a lean-to outbuilding on the left. The main entrance has a timber porch, and the entrance in the fourth bay has a lean-to canopy and a bench. Most of the windows are casements, and in the fourth bay are sashes. The barn projects to the right and has a barn entrance and a cow house entrance, and outshuts at the right and the rear. | II |
| Newby Bridge Farmhouse, outbuildings and mill 54.26787°N 2.97510°W | — | 18th century | The house, outbuildings and mill are in stone, partly roughcast, with slate roofs. The house has two storeys (three at the rear), four bays, an outshut at the front, an out building on each side, and the mill at the rear. The windows at the front of the house are casements, and elsewhere are mullioned windows and sash windows. The mill contains machinery, and has three upper cruck trusses. | II |
| Seatle Hall; 54.24012°N 2.95443°W | — | 18th century (probable) | A roughcast stone house with a slate roof, two storeys and three bays. On the front is a gabled porch. Most of the windows are sashes, and on the ground floor at the rear are cross-mullioned windows and stair windows. | II |
| Seatle Farm Cottage and outbuilding 54.23992°N 2.95470°W | — | 18th century (probable) | A stone house and outbuilding, the house is partly roughcast. It has two storeys, two bays, and a gabled wing at the rear. On the front is a gabled porch, the ground floor windows are casements, and there are sash windows in the upper floor. The outbuilding to the left has steps leading up to two doorways. | II |
| Sundial; 54.26523°N 2.95455°W | — | 18th century | The sundial is in the churchyard of St Mary's Church. It is in stone, and consists of a square pier with a moulded base and cap. On the top is a small decorated and inscribed bowl. There is no plate or gnomon. | II |
| Town Head; 54.28131°N 2.94827°W | — | 18th century | A house, partly used later as a shop, it is in roughcast stone with slate roofs. The south front has two storeys and five bays, the outer bays recessed with hipped roofs and verandahs. On the front is a three-bay verandah with Doric columns, a frieze, a cornice, and a parapet. There is a right rear wing of three bays and a left rear wing of six bays, both with two-storey bow windows. The left wing has a single-storey service wing, a lean-to porch, and there is also a rear gabled stair wing. | II |
| Barn, Yewtree Farm; 54.23613°N 2.93000°W | — | 18th century (probable) | The barn is in stone with a slate roof. On the front is an entrance with a segmental head, at the left end is a small outshut, and at the right end is a gabled wing. There are three outshuts at the rear. | II |
| Seatle East Farmhouse; 54.24006°N 2.95533°W | — | Late 18th century | A roughcast stone farmhouse with a slate roof. It has two storeys, three bays, a four-bay rear wing, and a single-storey gabled extension and an outshut to the left. On the front is a shallow gabled porch, the windows on the front are sashes, and at the rear is a stair window. | II |
| Milestone; 54.26805°N 2.96332°W | — | Late 18th or early 19th century | The milestone, on the north side of the A592 road, was provided for the Kirkby Kendal to Kirkby Ireleth Turnpike Trust. It consists of a round-headed post inscribed with an initial and a number indicating the distance in miles to Kendal. | II |
| Rose Cottage; 54.23630°N 2.93060°W | — | Early 19th century | A roughcast stone house with a slate roof, two storeys and two bays. On the front is a gabled timber trellis porch. The windows are sashes, those on the ground floor with hood moulds. | II |
| Manager's House, Fell Foot Park; 54.27590°N 2.95114°W | — | 1869 | Originally a gas works, later converted into a house, it is in stone with quoins, limestone dressings, and a slate roof. There are two storeys with attics, three bays, and a rear wing with lean-to extensions. The central bay projects forward under a gable with decorative bargeboards. The windows are casements with limestone lintels. | II |
| Northern Boathouse, Fell Foot Park; 54.27626°N 2.95222°W | — | 1869 | The boathouse is in slate rubble with a slate roof. The boat entrance has a Tudor arched head, and a timber portcullis and doors. It is flanked by turrets with slots and projecting embattled parapets. The gable is also embattled, and has a raised embattled panel. | II |
| Southern Boathouse, Fell Foot Park; 54.27581°N 2.95222°W | | 1869 | The boathouse is in slate rubble with a slate roof. It has a pointed boat entrance with an arrow slit above on the west side, a blocked pointed window to the left, and an embattled parapet. There is another pointed entrance on the east side. | II |
| Workshop and dock, Fell Foot Park; 54.27591°N 2.95217°W | | 1869 | The workshop is in slate rubble with limestone dressings and a slate roof. On the west side is a window with a pointed head and an embattled parapet, and the entrance also has a pointed head. At the entrance to the dock is a round-headed arch with imposts, flanking turrets, and an embattled parapet. | II |
| Newby Bridge; 54.26898°N 2.97037°W | | Uncertain | The bridge, which was repaired in the 17th century, is in stone with limestone coping. It consists of five segmental arches, and is higher in the centre. There are large triangular cutwaters that rise to form refuges on both sides. The bridge is also a scheduled monument. | II* |
