= Field Broughton =

Village in Cumbria, England

Coordinates: 54.224°N 2.939°W

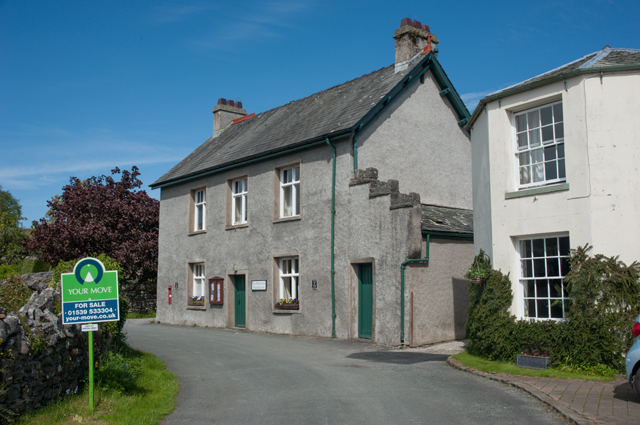
- Field Broughton Parish Rooms

- Location in South Lakeland Location within Cumbria
- OS grid reference: SD387813
- Civil parish: Broughton East
- Unitary authority: Westmorland and Furness
- Ceremonial county: Cumbria
- Region: North West
- Country: England
- Sovereign state: United Kingdom
- Post town: GRANGE-OVER-SANDS
- Postcode district: LA11
- Dialling code: 015395
- Police: Cumbria
- Fire: Cumbria
- Ambulance: North West
- UK Parliament: Westmorland and Lonsdale

Field Broughton is a village in the Westmorland and Furness Unitary Authority of the English county of Cumbria.

The village forms part of the civil parish of Broughton East.

== Location ==
It is about four miles away from the town of Grange-over-Sands.

== Transport ==
For transport there is the A590 road and Grange-over-Sands railway station nearby.

== Nearby settlements ==
Nearby settlements include the town of Grange-over-Sands, the villages of High Newton and Cartmel and the hamlets of Low Newton and Barber Green. It has a church called St. Peter's Church.

== See also ==
- Listed buildings in Broughton East
