= George Ridehalgh =

Colonel George John Miller Ridehalgh (1835–1892) was a director of the North Lonsdale Iron and Steel Company, colonel of the 2nd Westmorland Volunteer Battalion Border Regiment] and one of the founder members of the Royal Windermere Yacht Club. He lived at Fell Foot Park in Staveley-in-Cartmel, Cumbria, England, where the gothic boat-houses he built still exist and are Grade II listed buildings, although the house was demolished in 1907.

He married Frances Rosa "Fanny" Reade in 1856; she died in 1870, and they had no children. A group of nearly 60 letters he had written to her over the years before their marriage were found in 2006 in a secret compartment of a desk under restoration, and reported in the Daily Telegraph. He later married Elizabeth, but is buried in Staveley churchyard in a grave shared with Fanny, whose inscription reads "In affectionate remembrance of Fanny Rosa, the beloved wife of GJM Ridehalgh of Fell Foot, died May 2nd, 1870, aged 45 years. Blessed are the dead who die in the Lord".

He owned several yachts on Windermere. The Britannia, built for him in 1879 by Seaths, was bought by the Furness Railway in 1907 and carried 122 passengers in great comfort as a charter vessel. She was laid up during World War I and scrapped in 1919.
