= Listed buildings in Lindale and Newton-in-Cartmel =

Lindale and Newton-in-Cartmel (sometimes spelled without hyphens) is a civil parish in the Westmorland and Furness district of Cumbria, England, known until April 2018 as Allithwaite Upper or Upper Allithwaite. It contains 17 listed buildings that are recorded in the National Heritage List for England. Of these, two are listed at Grade II*, the middle of the three grades, and the others are at Grade II, the lowest grade. The parish is in the Lake District National Park. It contains the villages of Lindale, High Newton, and Low Newton, and is otherwise rural. The listed buildings consist of farmhouses, farm buildings, houses with associated structures, the wall of a Friends' burial ground, a limekiln, a bridge, two memorials, and a church.

== Key ==
Grade	Criteria
II*	Particularly important buildings of more than special interest
II	Buildings of national importance and special interest

== Buildings ==
Name and location	Photograph	Date	Notes	Grade
Newton Hall Cottage and Jessamine Cottage; 54.23765°N 2.92070°W	—	1673	A pair of houses, at right angles, roughcast with slate roofs and two storeys. Newton Hall Cottage has four bays, the first bay is gabled, and it forms the end of Jessamine Cottage. Most of the windows are sashes, and the doorway is in the second bay. Jessamine Cottage has two bays and contains small-paned windows.	II
Friends' Burial Ground walls 54.25475°N 2.91248°W	—	c. 1676	The wall to the Friends' burial ground is in stone and encloses a semicircular area. It runs along the road for about 45 metres (148 ft), and at the south end is an entrance with a gabled porch that has an inscribed lintel.	II
Barrow Wife; 54.25568°N 2.91203°W	—	1677	Originally a Friends' meeting house, later a private house, it is in stone with a slate roof. There are two storeys and four bays, and an outbuilding at the rear. There is a two-storey gabled porch in the third bay with a round-headed opening, and above this is a datestone and a round-headed window. The windows have small-paned glazing.	II*
Skinner Hill; 54.21936°N 2.90158°W	—	1686	A stone house, partly roughcast with a slate roof. There are two storeys and three bays, a lean-to extension on the left and an outshut at the rear. Most of the windows are small-paned casements, those in the ground floor having slate lintels and hood moulds.	II
Barrow Hollin; 54.25575°N 2.91192°W	—	1714	A roughcast stone house with a slate roof, two storeys and three bays. On the front is a gabled porch, the windows have small-paned glazing, and there are hood moulds above the ground floor windows.	II
East View and Fell Cottage; 54.23193°N 2.91343°W	—	18th century (probable)	A pair of stone houses with limestone quoins and a slate roof. There are two storeys and three bays, and the windows are fixed with small panes and opening lights.	II
Low Green Farmhouse; 54.23423°N 2.88579°W	—	18th century	A stone house with quoins and a slate roof. There are two storeys with an attic, two bays, a small gabled wing at the rear, and a single-storey lean-to extension on the left. The windows are small-paned casements, some with segmental heads.	II
Newton Hall; 54.23763°N 2.92089°W	—	1754	A roughcast stone house with a slate roof. It has two storeys, a symmetrical front of three bays, and a gabled rear wing. The windows on the front are sashes, and at the rear most have small-paned fixed glazing. In the centre of the front is a doorway with rusticated jambs, a flat arch, a keystone, and a pediment on consoles. The rear doorway has a gabled canopy.	II
Greensyke; 54.23783°N 2.92091°W	—	1765	A roughcast stone house with a slate roof, two storeys and three bays. The porch has a segmental pediment on consoles, and the windows are sashes. At the rear is a small-paned stair window.	II
Barn, Low Green Farm; 54.23409°N 2.88617°W	—	Late 18th century	A bank barn with quoins, and a roof mainly in corrugated iron, and partly in slate. On the south side are six cow house entrances with segmental heads, at the end is an opening with an elliptical head, and there is a winnowing door with a segmental head. At the rear two barn entrances are approached by a ramp. There is also an outshut with three cow house doors.	II
Limekiln; 54.23030°N 2.91983°W	—	18th or early 19th century	The limekiln stands on an outcrop of rock, and is in stone. It is a square structure, with an arched opening on the east side.	II
Wilson House Bridge; 54.22059°N 2.88243°W	—	Late 18th or early 19th century	The bridge carries a road over River Winster. It is in stone, and consists of a single segmental arch with a keystone, a band, and a coped parapet.	II
Monument to John Wilkinson; 54.21538°N 2.89334°W		1808	The monument to the industrialist John Wilkinson consists of a cast iron obelisk painted black. It is 40 feet (12 m) high, and stands on a square base on stone steps. It contains inscriptions and a gilt plaque with a bust of Wilkinson in relief. The memorial was originally over Wilkinson's grave in his garden, and was moved to its present site in 1863.	II*
Bleacrag Bridge; 54.24638°N 2.88764°W	—	1816 (probable)	The bridge carries Holme Road over the River Winster. It is in stone, and consists of a single elliptical arch. The bridge has straight parapets with limestone coping, and on the south side is an inscribed plaque and a benchmark.	II
Eller How; 54.22459°N 2.90321°W	—	c. 1818	Originally a cottage designed by Francis Webster, it was considerably enlarged between 1827 and 1850 by George Webster. It is built in rendered slate with roofs of Westmorland slate, and is in cottage orné style. The house is in one and two storeys, with an irregular plan, and includes multiple gables with ornate bargeboards, finials and drops, and Tudor-style chimneys. At the north end is a porch in Italianate style. Associated with the house are an ornamental lake with a bridge and a weir, and walls with balustrades and piers.	II
Webster Memorial; 54.21595°N 2.90002°W		1827	The memorial is in the form of a mausoleum to the architect Francis Webster, and it stands in the churchyard of St Paul's Church opposite the south door. It is in limestone, and has angle pilaster strips with round heads. Surrounding the top are cast iron railings with decorative finials. On the tomb slab is an inscription to Francis Webster, and a plaque commemorating his architect son George.	II
St Paul's Church; 54.21600°N 2.89985°W		1828	The church was designed by George Webster, the chancel, vestry and organ loft were added in 1864, and the aisle in 1912. The original part is roughcast, the chancel is in limestone, the aisle is in stone rubble, and the roof is slated. The church consists of a nave clasping a west tower, a north aisle, a south porch, and a chancel with a north vestry. The tower has a projecting embattled parapet and a pyramidal roof with an ornate cross. The windows are lancets.	II
