= Broughton East =

Civil parish in Cumbria, England

Coordinates: 54.215°N 2.934°W

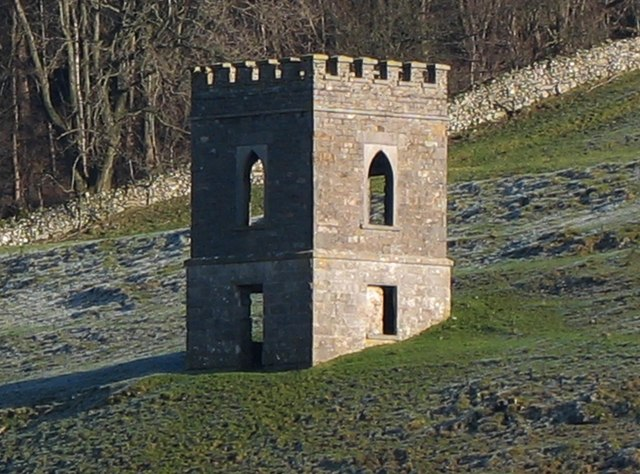
- Longlands Tower

- Location within Cumbria
- Population: 196 (2011)
- OS grid reference: SD3881
- Civil parish: Broughton East
- Unitary authority: Westmorland and Furness
- Ceremonial county: Cumbria
- Region: North West
- Country: England
- Sovereign state: United Kingdom
- Post town: GRANGE OVER SANDS
- Postcode district: LA11
- Dialling code: 01539
- Police: Cumbria
- Fire: Cumbria
- Ambulance: North West
- UK Parliament: Westmorland and Lonsdale

Broughton East is a civil parish in the Westmorland and Furness Unitary Authority of Cumbria, England. In the 2001 census the parish had a population of 173, increasing at the 2011 census to 196. The parish includes the village of Field Broughton and the hamlet of Green Bank at grid reference SD379803. The Parish sits at the southern border of the Lake District National Park. The name Broughton may have come about due to the area being home to a brook or stream.

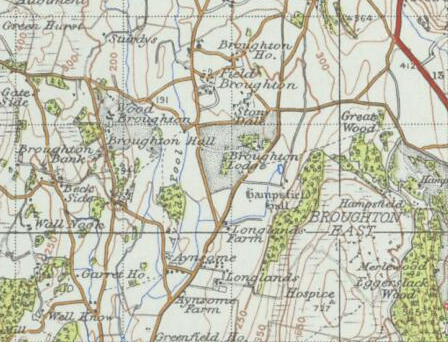
Broughton East Ordnance Survey Map

== History ==
Until the 18th Century the area which Broughton East is situated was known as Broughton. It was referred to as "Brochton" in 1277. It was under the control of the Manor of Cartmel, originally Cartmel Priory. The parish was mainly made up of small farms who were tenants of the manor and would pay rent to its owners. Records of the rents show that oats and barley were grown by the villagers as William Mokeld took note of what he included around 1508-9. This was “a rent of 19d. each term, paying 15d. for service and 20d for ingress, with 1d. and a hen and a half for tithe hay and 9 bushels of oats and 6 pecks of barley for tithe corn”. The only other estate was that at Hampsfield, centred on the 17th century Hampsfield Hall under Hampsfell. This replaced a medieval peel tower for defence against the Scots.

In the 1870s, Broughton East was described as:

BROUGHTON (East), or Broughton-Field, a township-chapelry in Cartmel parish, Lancashire; 4 miles N of Cartmel r. station, and 7 NE of Ulverstone. Post Town, Cartmel, under Newton-in-Cartmel. Acres, 2,830. Real property, £4,332. Pop., 534. Houses, 107.

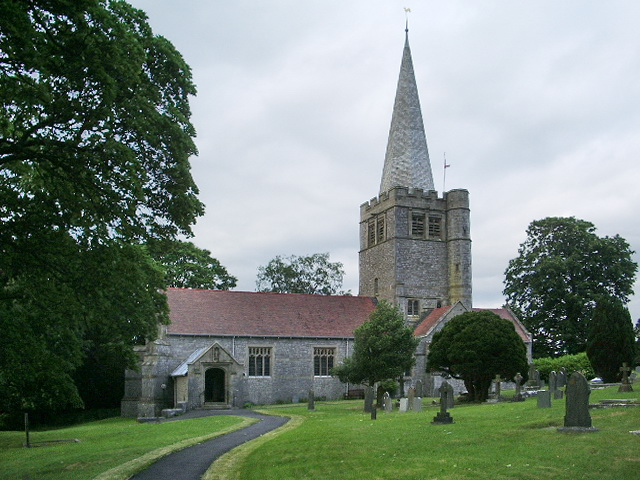
St Peter's Church

One of the most significant developments of the village was the building of St Peter's church in 1894, replacing a chapel of ease from 1745. The building was made of red sandstone and was built for £3,000. It was designed by local architects Paley and Austin, and its high shingled spire is a prominent local landmark.

The parish is dominated by the 222m high hill of Hampsfell (short for Hampsfield Fell). This is topped by extensive limestone pavements and a shelter or 'hospice' built in 1846.

== Population ==
Broughton East has generally had a small population with most people being farmers. However, the population was 534 by the 1870s and was nearly 1800 in 1890. In 1881 over 50 people still worked in agriculture, but a large number of people - over 200 females and 50 males - worked in domestic service.

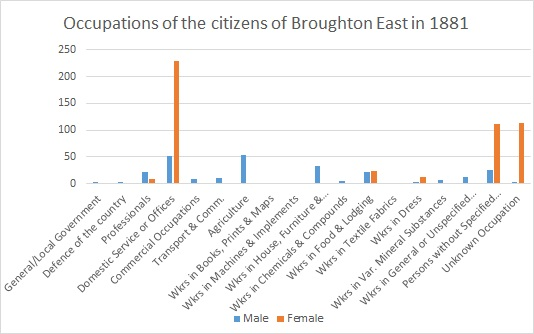
Occupations of Broughton East Citizens in 1881

Boundary changes in the early twentieth century reduced the size of the parish leaving it with a population of around 200 which has stayed constant since. The nature of employment has changed greatly since 1881. 103 residents were in employment as of 2011. Many of these jobs are in professional and managerial positions which together make up half the working population.

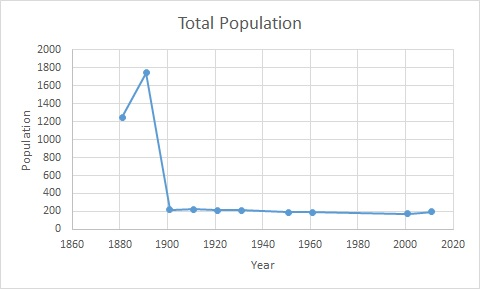
Total population of Broughton East Civil Parish, Cumbria, as reported by the Census of Population from 1881 to 2011.

== See also ==
- Listed buildings in Broughton East
