= Listed buildings in Broughton East =

Broughton East is a civil parish in the Westmorland and Furness, Cumbria, England. It contains 20 listed buildings that are recorded in the National Heritage List for England. Of these, one is listed at Grade II*, the middle of the three grades, and the others are at Grade II, the lowest grade. The parish contains the village of Field Broughton and smaller settlements, and is otherwise rural. Most of the listed buildings are houses and associated structures, farmhouses and farm buildings. The other listed buildings consist of two folly towers, a milestone, an animal pound, a limekiln, and a church.

== Key ==
Grade	Criteria
II*	Particularly important buildings of more than special interest
II	Buildings of national importance and special interest

== Buildings ==
Name and location	Photograph	Date	Notes	Grade
Greenbank Farmhouse and Cottage; 54.21520°N 2.95100°W	—	1663	Two houses in roughcast stone with a slate roof. There are two storeys, the cottage on the left has one bay, the farmhouse has three, and at the rear are two gabled wings. On the front of the cottage is a gabled porch, and on the front of the farmhouse is an asymmetrical porch, and a door with a dated and initialled lintel flanked by consoles brackets. Most of the windows on the front are sashes, and at the rear they are casements.	II
Hampsfield Hall; 54.21653°N 2.92902°W	—	1687 or earlier	A roughcast stone farmhouse with a slate roof. It has two storeys with attics, two bays, the left bay being gabled, and a rear outbuilding. The windows are varied; some are mullioned, others are sashes, there are also casement windows, and many windows have hood moulds. In the left bay is a gabled porch, and in the right bay is a doorway with a chamfered surround.	II
Borwicks Aynsome Farmhouse and outbuildings 54.20678°N 2.94391°W	—	Late 17th or early 18th century (probable)	The farmhouse and outbuildings are in roughcast stone with a slate roof. There are two storeys, and the farmhouse has five bays and a central doorway. The windows are mullioned with hollow-chamfered surrounds, and contain casements. To the north is a long outbuilding, and to the rear are barns; these have casement windows, various entrances, and a pitching hole.	II
Ridding Fold; 54.21576°N 2.91439°W	—	Late 17th or early 18th century (probable)	A stone house with a slate roof, and two storeys. There are five bays, a lean-to outhouse on the right, and a gabled wing at the rear. In the centre is a lean-to porch, and the windows are casements, some having flat arches with voussoirs. In the rear wing is a mullioned window with a chamfered surround and a hood mould.	II
Stonelands and outbuilding 54.22478°N 2.94000°W	—	1708	The house and outbuildings are in stone with a slate roof. The house has two storeys and three bays, an open porch and casement windows. The outbuilding, which projects on the right, has paired doors.	II
High Hampsfield Farmhouse; 54.21548°N 2.91525°W	—	Early 18th century (probable)	A roughcast farmhouse with a slate roof, it has two storeys and four bays, the first bay being recessed. In the first bay is a doorway with a canopy, and in the third bay is a gabled porch containing an outer door with a limestone lintel. The ground floor windows are casements, in the upper floor they are sashes, and there is a fire window.	II
Milestone; 54.20644°N 2.94487°W	—	18th century	The milestone has a triangular plan, with one angle removed. On the faces are panels inscribed with the distances in miles to Hawkshead and to Kendal.	II
Pound; 54.22641°N 2.94356°W	—	18th century (probable)	The pound stands near a road junction, it is in stone and has an oval plan. The pound measures about 11 metres (36 ft) by 8 metres (26 ft) and has walls about 2 metres (6 ft 7 in) high with limestone copings. There is a southwest opening with limestone quoins and a single gate post.	II
Broughton Lodge; 54.21944°N 2.93459°W	—	1770–80	A house built as a holiday house, and later converted into flats, it is in roughcast stone with bands, a cornice and a hipped slate roof. The central block has three storeys and five bays and is linked to flanking two-storey pavilions. There is a porch with unfluted Ionic columns, a frieze and a cornice, and the pavilions have pediments and Venetian windows. The other windows in the main block are sashes, and in the pavilions they are casements. At the rear is a bowed central bay with a parapet.	II
Former stables, Broughton Lodge; 54.21933°N 2.93345°W	—	1780–90	The former stables are in stone with a hipped slate roof. There are two storeys and five bays. The central bay protrudes forward under a pediment, and the end bays also project, and have hipped gables. The central bay contains an elliptical-headed entrance, and the windows in the lower floor are sashes. In the central bay of the upper floor is a lunette, in the end bays are round-headed windows, and elsewhere are ventilation slits. On the right side steps lead up to a first floor entrance.	II
Stony Dale; 54.22319°N 2.93431°W	—	c. 1790	The house was extended in 1811. It is in roughcast stone with quoins and a hipped slate roof. There are two storeys, three bays, a recessed single-bay wing to the left, and two wings at the rear. In the centre is a timber gabled porch, and a round-headed doorway that has panelled pilasters and a blind fanlight. In the left wing is a bay window, most of the other windows are sashes, and on one of the rear wings is a pineapple finial.	II
Broughton House and Broughton House Croft; 54.22664°N 2.93575°W	—	Late 18th or early 19th century (probable)	Two roughcast stone houses with quoins, a top frieze, a corbelled cornice, and a hipped slate roof. There are two storeys and three bays. The entrance has a Doric doorcase with a frieze and a cornice, and there is another entrance with a canopy. The windows are sashes, apart from one casement window.	II
Longlands; 54.20810°N 2.93835°W	—	c. 1820	A stone house with a band, wide bracketed eaves and a slate roof. The central block has a hipped roof, two storeys, a front of five bays, the outer bays breaking forward and gabled, and three bays on the sides. The central block is flanked by two-bay pavilions with one storey and attics. At the rear are projecting wings, one with four bays. The porch has columns, a frieze, a cornice and a blocking course, and above the door is a fanlight. Most of the windows are sashes, and there are also painted blind windows.	II
Hampsfell Hospice; 54.20654°N 2.92246°W		1834–46	The tower is a folly in limestone. It has a square plan, with stone benches around the base, and at the top is a frieze, a cornice band, and iron railings. On the east front is a gated entrance with an inscribed frieze. On the sides are small windows, and external steps lead up to the flat roof that contains a turntable indicating the landmarks. Inside the tower, two angles are canted, one containing a fireplace, and the other a recess. Surrounding the outside of the tower are twelve posts supporting chains.	II
Hampsfell Tower; 54.20917°N 2.93171°W		1834–46	The tower, also known has Longlands Tower, is a folly in limestone. It has two storeys, a square plan, a band, and a projecting embattled parapet. The windows in the ground floor have flat tops, and in the upper floor they are pointed.	II
Limekiln; 54.21852°N 2.92032°W	—	c. 1840 or before	The limekiln is in limestone. On the west face is a fire opening with a segmental head, at the rear is a platform with stone abutments, and on the top is an opening about 2 metres (6 ft 7 in) in diameter.	II
Broughton Hall; 54.22075°N 2.95425°W	—	c. 1840	A house in roughcast stone with modillioned eaves, moulded gutters, and slate roofs. There are two storeys with attics, a front of five bays, the first two bays being recessed, and at the rear is a projecting stair bay, a gabled wing, and outshuts. On the front is a porch with a Tudor arch and a pediment, and the inner doorway has a chamfered surround and an embattled lintel. Most of the windows are sashes, and in the left return are two two-light mullioned windows.	II
Barn, High Hampsfield Farmhouse; 54.21570°N 2.91532°W	—	19th century (probable)	The barn is in stone with quoins and a slate roof. On the southwest front is a barn entrance with a gabled wing on the left and an outshut to the right, and at the rear are cow house entrances.	II
Greenhouse, Stoney Dale; 54.22362°N 2.93375°W	—	Mid 19th century (probable)	The building is in timber and stone, and has a stone base. There are eight bays on the front, and five on the sides. It has a corbelled cornice with iron cresting and angle blocks, and iron cresting and finials on the roof ridge. To the north is a small stone building with a gabled slate roof.	II
St Peter's Church; 54.22801°N 2.94194°W		1892–94	The church was designed by Paley, Austin and Paley in free Perpendicular style. It is built in limestone with sandstone dressings, and has a red tiled roof and a shingled spire. The church consists of a nave with a south porch, transepts with west aisles, a steeple at the crossing, a chancel and a north vestry. The steeple has a tower with an embattled parapet, an octagonal stair turret at the southeast, and a recessed spire with a weathercock.	II*
