= Listed buildings in Levens, Cumbria =

Levens is a civil parish in Westmorland and Furness, England. It contains 21 listed buildings that are recorded in the National Heritage List for England. Of these, one is listed at Grade I, the highest of the three grades, two are at Grade II*, the middle grade, and the others are at Grade II, the lowest grade. The parish contains the village of Levens and the surrounding countryside. The major building in the parish is Levens Hall; this and associated structures are listed. The other listed buildings include houses, farmhouses, farm buildings, a bridge, a church, and a limekiln.

== Key ==
Grade	Criteria
I	Buildings of exceptional interest, sometimes considered to be internationally important
II*	Particularly important buildings of more than special interest
II	Buildings of national importance and special interest

== Buildings ==
Name and location	Photograph	Date	Notes	Grade
Nether Levens Farmhouse and store 54.25906°N 2.78712°W	—	Early 16th century (probable)	Additions were made later in the 16th century and subsequently. The farmhouse is in stone with sandstone dressings and it has a slate roof with a stone ridge. There are four massive round chimneys, and one smaller one. The house has two storeys, an irregular plan, and various windows, most of which are mullioned and transomed with hood moulds. Inside are many original features.	II*
Levens Hall; 54.25905°N 2.77633°W		16th century	A country house that contains 14th-century fabric and was remodelled in the late 17th century. It is in limestone, partly rendered, with sandstone dressings, and has a slate roof with stone and lead ridges and coped gables. There are two storeys with attics and basements, and the main front has four bays. The third bay has an embattled tower, and the other bays are gabled. The windows are mullioned and transomed, most have hood moulds, and the door is approached by stone steps. There is a service wing that has a square clock tower with a dome and a gilded ball finial.	I
Old stables, cottages and gate piers, Levens Hall; 54.25956°N 2.77540°W		Mid-16th century (probable)	The stables have been converted into houses. They are in stone with sandstone dressings, and have green slate roofs with stone ridges. There are two storeys and eight irregular bays. Most of the windows are casements with mullions, and the doorway has a moulded surround and a cornice. The gate piers at the northeast corner are part-octagonal and have moulded shafts and ball finials, and are flanked by blank niches with semicircular heads.	II*
Ha-ha, Levens Hall; 54.25802°N 2.77726°W	—	c. 1692	The ha-ha is in limestone. It is semicircular with a radius of about 10 metres (33 ft), and is about 3 metres (9.8 ft) high.	II
Garden feature, Levens Hall; 54.25710°N 2.77507°W		Before 1720	The feature, known as the "Smoke House", has a front dating from the 19th century. It is timber framed with rendered lath and plaster infill, and it has a slate roof with a stone ridge.	II
Heaves Farmhouse and barn 54.27281°N 2.78173°W	—	17th century	The farmhouse and barn are under one roof, and the barn is slightly later. They are in limestone, partly roughcast, and have a green slate roof with a stone ridge. There are two storeys, the main front of the house faces east and has three irregular bays, and modern doors and windows. The barn contains four doors in the ground floor and a barn door in the upper floor approached by a ramp.	II
Levens Bridge; 54.26015°N 2.77503°W		17th century (probable)	The bridge was later widened, and carries the A6 road over the River Kent. It is in limestone and consists of two arches with voussoirs and cutwaters. The parapets have flat sandstone coping. The bridge is also a scheduled monument.	II
Dovecote northwest of Nether Levens Farmhouse; 54.25955°N 2.78738°W	—	17th century (possible)	The dovecote is in limestone and has a 20th-century metal roof. In the east front is an opening with three massive oak lintels, and at a higher level on all sides is a small square opening. Inside there are nesting boxes.	II
Frosthwaite Farmhouse and store 54.27497°N 2.77087°W	—	Late 17th century (probable)	The farmhouse, with a store attached to the right, is in roughcast stone, and has a green slate roof with a stone ridge. It has a T-shaped plan, two storeys at the front and three at the rear. Along the front is a slated lean-to canopy on three cast iron posts. The windows are casements, those in the ground floor having segmental arched heads. On the left of the house is a massive stepped chimney.	II
Walls, gate piers and gates north of Levens Hall; 54.25972°N 2.77608°W	—	c. 1700	The wall runs along the north side of the garden. It is a low stone wall with sandstone dressings and moulded copings, on which are four sandstone piers and timber balusters. In the centre is a gateway with rusticated piers with plinths and cornices, and containing decorative wrought iron gates. On top of the piers are vases, and there are more vases at intervals along the wall.	II
Underhill House, barn and pigsties 54.26743°N 2.79175°W	—	Late 17th to early 18th century	The buildings are in stone, the house and barn (which is now incorporated into the house) are rendered, and the roof is slated. The house and barn have two storeys, and the pigsties have quoins and a lean-to roof. On the north front is a stair turret, two small windows, and a lean-to porch. On the south front are sash windows and a doorway.	II
Lawrence House and Levens Brow; 54.26227°N 2.77466°W	—	1708	Formerly one house, later divided into two, the oldest part was rebuilt following a fire, an extension was added to the south probably in the early 19th century, and the north wing was added in about 1910. The house is in stone, partly rendered, with a green slate roof. It has a double-depth plan, and two storeys. All the windows date from the 19th century; some are mullioned and transomed with hood moulds, and others are casements. On the front is a gabled stone porch.	II
Barn, Frosthwaite Farm; 54.27467°N 2.77085°W	—	18th century	This consists of a bank barn with a shippon below. It is in stone with through-stones, it has a green slate roof with a stone ridge, and a lean-to extension on the left. The openings include a wagon door with a small slate canopy, a mullioned window, and a shippon door.	II
Dovecote north-north-east of Nether Levens Farmhouse; 54.25987°N 2.78693°W	—	18th century (possible)	The dovecote is in limestone and has a green slate pyramidal roof with stone hips and a broken finial. On the east side is an opening with a timber lintel, and there is a smaller opening above. Inside are nesting boxes.	II
Heaves Hotel; 54.27347°N 2.77338°W	—	c. 1818	Originally a country house and later a hotel, it was designed by Francis and George Webster in Greek Revival style, and a mansard roof was added in 1932 by Austin and Paley. The building is in sandstone on a plinth, with quoins, a sill band, and a green slate roof with a corniced parapet. There are two storeys with attics, and a front of three bays. On the front is a central porch with four fluted Ionic columns and a dentilled cornice. There is a French window in the centre of the upper floor, and the other windows are sashes in moulded surrounds.	II
Barn and granary, Lawrence House; 54.26240°N 2.77431°W	—	Early 19th century (probable)(architecture)|	This consists of a barn with stables, and a granary at right angles. They are in stone, partly on a plinth, with some through-stones, and a green slate roof with a stone ridge. The barn has eight bays and contains a wagon door. In the granary are a window, three doors, one in the upper with a small gable and approached by external steps. Between the barn and the granary is a wagon arch with a sandstone surround.	II
Gatepiers, Levens Hall; 54.25989°N 2.77526°W		Early 19th century (probable)	The gate piers and walls flank the entrance to the hall. The piers are square, in sandstone, and are rusticated. Each pier has a moulded plinth, and an overhanging top cornice on which is a limestone pine cone in an acanthus cup. Outside the piers are curving walls.	II
Potting shed, stores and gates, Levens Hall; 54.25877°N 2.77717°W	—	Early 19th century (probable)	The potting shed and stores are at right angles, forming an L-shaped plan. They are in stone, the stores have limestone piers, and the roof is slated with a stone ridge. The buildings have a single storey, two windows and a door.	II
St John's Church; 54.26501°N 2.79198°W		1826–28	A vestry and a porch were added in 1873. The church is in limestone, on a plinth, with a band and a slate roof. It consists of a nave with a south porch, a narrower chancel with a north vestry, and a west steeple with a north organ chamber. The steeple has a rectangular tower, an octagonal belfry, and an octagonal spire. The windows are lancets.	II
Stable and hayloft, Frosthwaite Farm; 54.27481°N 2.77112°W	—	1849	The building is in limestone with quoins and through-stones. There are two storeys, and a single-storey extension to the right. There is a door in each floor, and two windows on the ground floor.	II
Limekiln; 54.26196°N 2.79106°W	—	Mid-19th century (probable)	The limekiln is built into a hillside, and is in limestone on a splayed plinth. It has an opening with a semicircular head and radiating voussoirs. The top is incomplete.	II
War memorial 54.26496°N 2.79169°W		1921	The war memorial is in the churchyard of St John's Church. It is in stone, and consists of a wheel-head cross on a tapering shaft with a moulded foot, on a tall tapering plinth, on a three-stepped square base. On the front of the plinth are two brass plaques with inscriptions and the names of those lost in the two World Wars.	II
