= Fell Foot Park =

Country park near Windermere, Cumbria, UK

Fell Foot
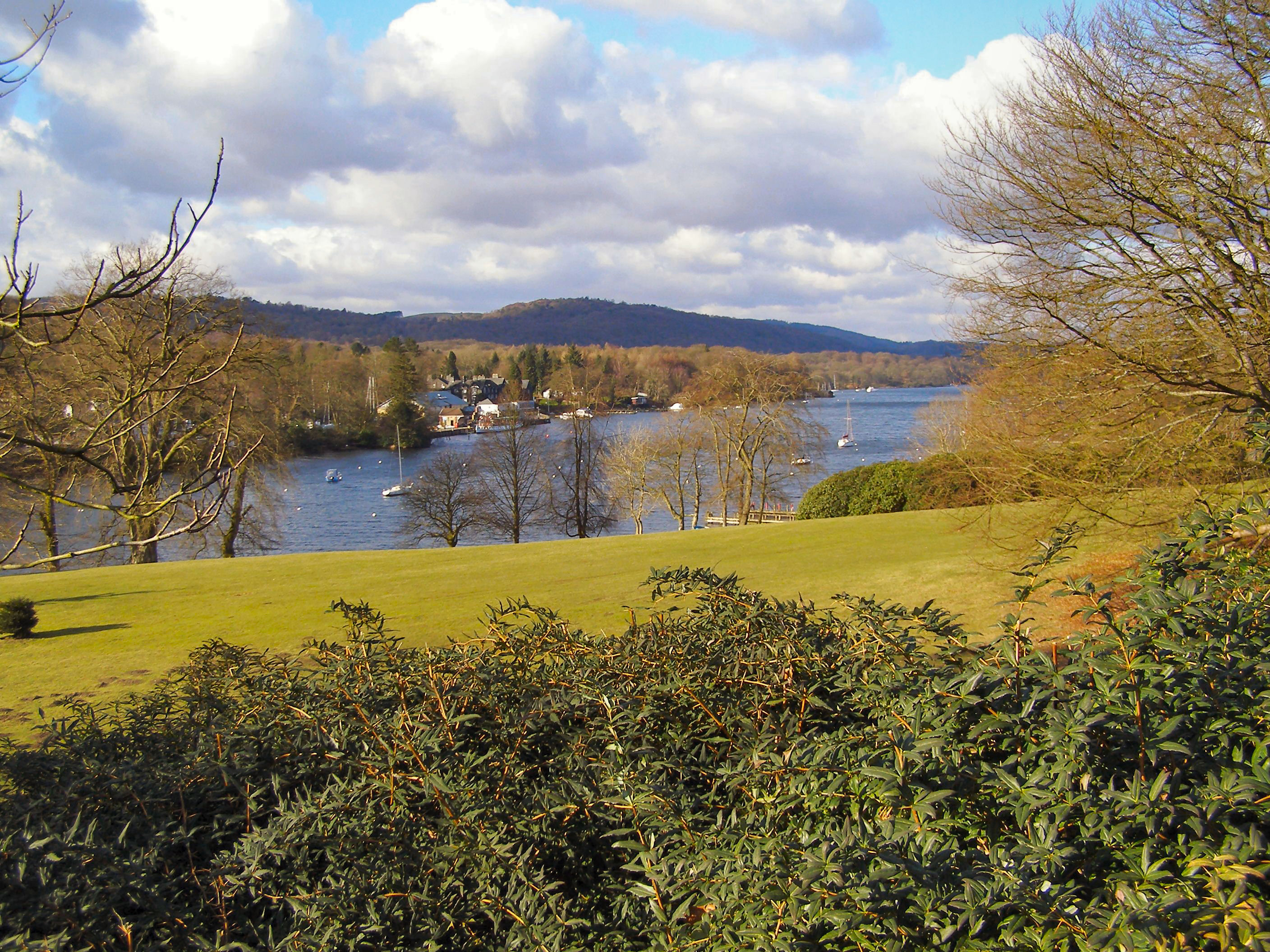
- Fell Foot Park

- Location within the former South Lakeland district Location within Cumbria
- Location: Cumbria, England
- Coordinates: 54.2751°N 2.9523°W
- Operator: National Trust

Fell Foot Park is a country park situated at the southern end of Windermere in Cumbria, the largest lake in England. It is north of Newby Bridge in the civil parish of Staveley-in-Cartmel, in Westmorland and Furness.

Formerly the grounds of a Victorian estate, it is now owned by the National Trust.

== History ==
The land was originally a farm until it was bought by Jeremiah Dixon, mayor of Leeds, in 1784; he began the process of converting it into an estate fit for a member of the gentry by replacing the farmhouse with a villa and moving the local highway (now the A592) away from the edge of the lake to a new route outside of the grounds.

Dixon sold the estate in 1814 to Francis Dukinfield Astley, an industrialist and poet from Cheshire who used it as a holiday residence. Astley was an expert on forestry, and he continued to develop Fell Foot into something more "picturesque," with long carriage driveways, boathouses, woodland trails, and "carefully designed views."

Astley died in 1825, and his son and heir, Francis Dukinfield Palmer Astley, later made the estate his primary residence until 1859, when he sold it to George Ridehalgh and moved to Scotland. Ridehalgh was a director of the North Lonsdale Iron and Steel Company, colonel of the 2nd Westmorland Volunteer Battalion Border Regiment, and one of the founder members of the Royal Windermere Yacht Club. Ridehalgh continued the improvements made by the Astleys, planting an arboretum and replacing the modest lakeside facilities with a "small harbour" consisting of three new piers and five new faux-medieval boathouses.

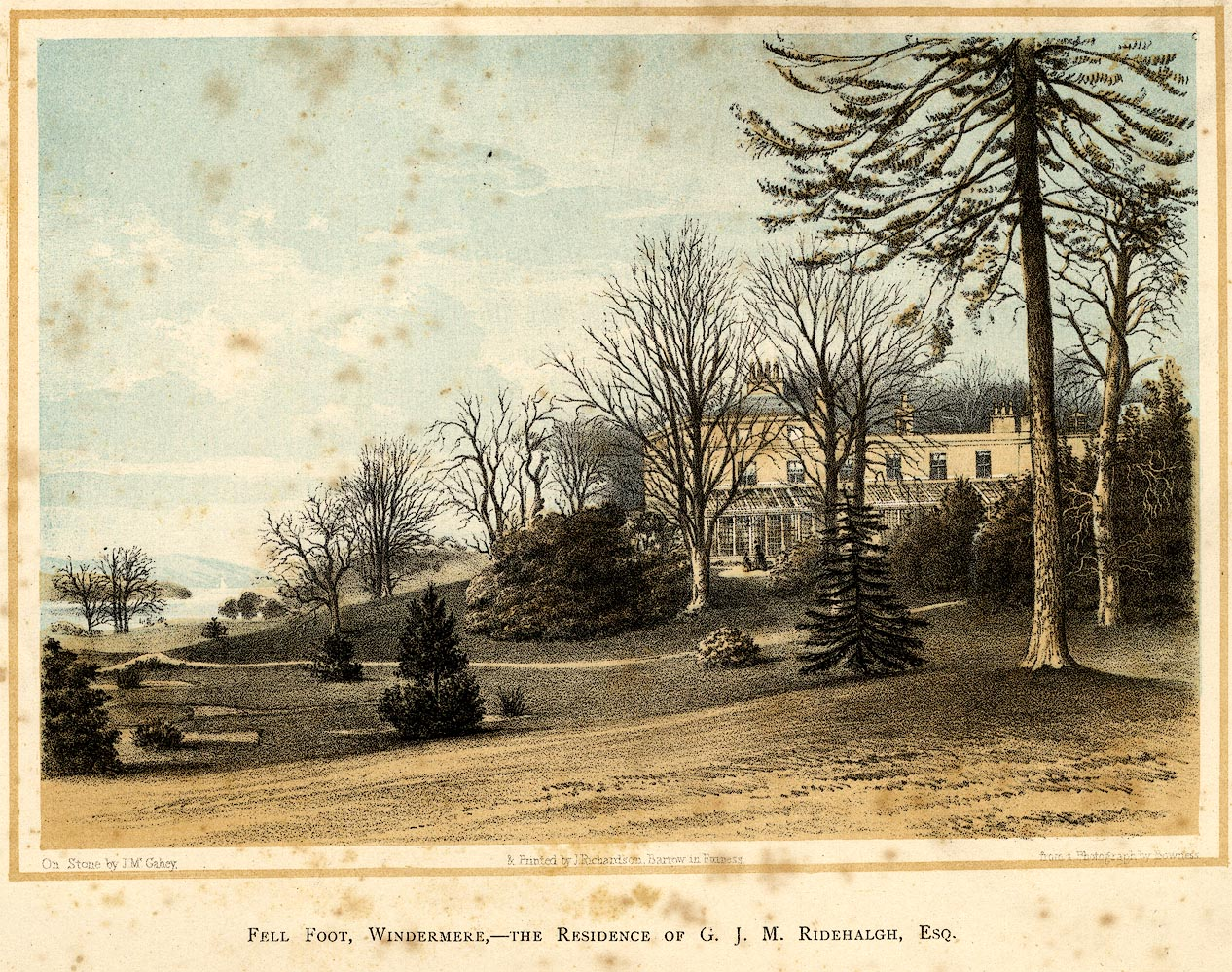
Lithograph, c.1870, showing Fell Foot estate with the villa constructed by Dixon

Ridehalgh died in 1892, and in 1908 his heirs sold the estate to Oswald Hedley, a director of the substantial coal business first founded by his great-grandfather William Hedley. Hedley tore down the villa to build a larger, neo-Jacobean replacement as a gift for his first wife, Marguerite—however, she died suddenly of peritonitis in 1909 and the project was cancelled, with only the cellars for the new house having been built. Hedley abandoned the estate, and it remained unused until his third wife, Edith, donated it to the National Trust in 1948 after his death.

== Current park ==
The manager's house (originally a gas works which provided lighting for the estate), the boathouses (including one converted to a cafe), a workshop, and the dock are all Grade II listed buildings.

A local sailing and rowing club is located at the park, and rowing boat and kayak hire is available during summer months. Other facilities include car parking, toilets, a gift shop and a playground.

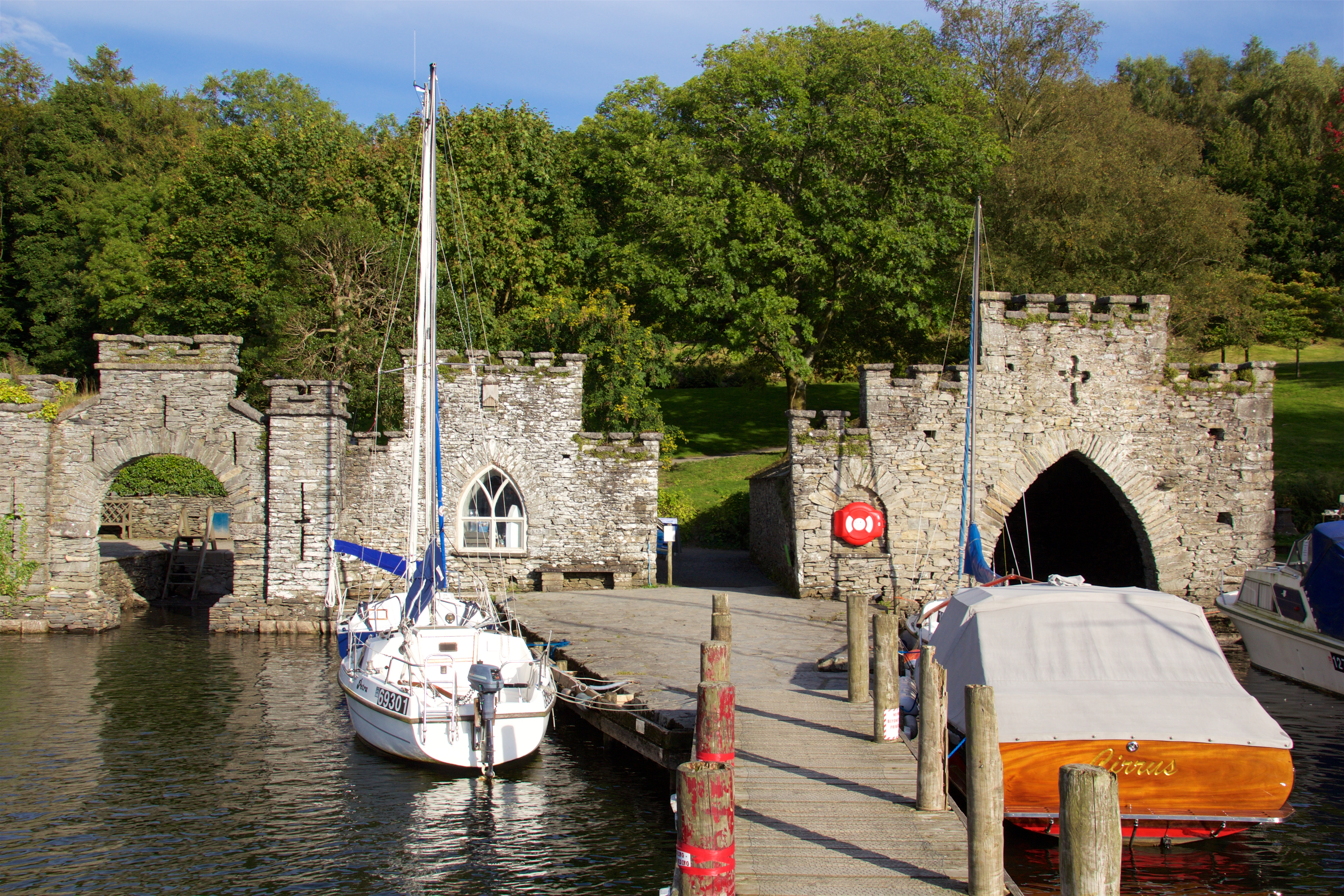
The distinctively crenellated stone-built boathouses

Between March and September, Windermere Lake Cruises operate a passenger ferry service from Lakeside station to Fell Foot. At Lakeside, connection can be made to the same company's steamer service to Bowness-on-Windermere and the preserved Lakeside and Haverthwaite Railway.

The park's buildings were flooded during the 2015–16 Great Britain and Ireland floods.

A new watersports centre opened at the north end of the park in 2018. The park holds regular events, including a parkrun event every Saturday and the All England Open Stone Skimming Championships every August.
