= Simpson Ground Reservoir =

Reservoir in Cumbria, England

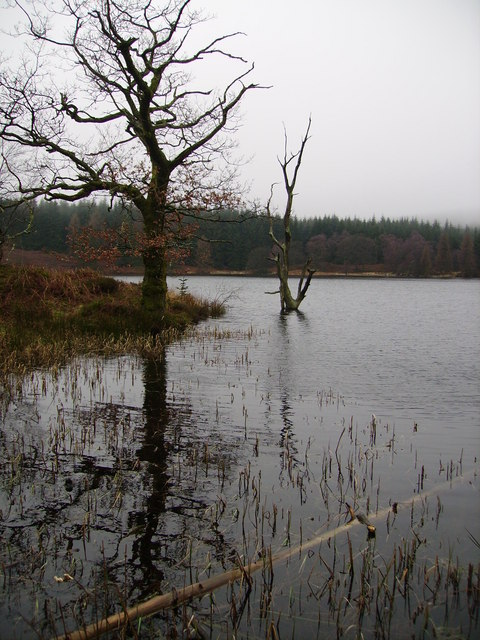
- Simpson Ground Reservoir, May 2007

- Location within Cumbria Location within the United Kingdom
- Interactive map of Simpson Ground Reservoir
- Location: Cumbria, England
- Coordinates: 54°16′6″N 2°55′48″W
- Type: Reservoir
- River sources: Way Beck
- Basin countries: United Kingdom
- First flooded: 4 May 1957
- Max. length: 455 metres (1,493 ft)
- Max. width: 194 metres (636 ft)
- Surface area: 6.89 hectares (17.0 acres)
- Max. depth: 27.5 metres (90 ft)
- Water volume: 44 million imperial gallons (53,000,000 US gal)
- Surface elevation: 193 metres (633 ft)
- Settlements: Staveley-in-Cartmel

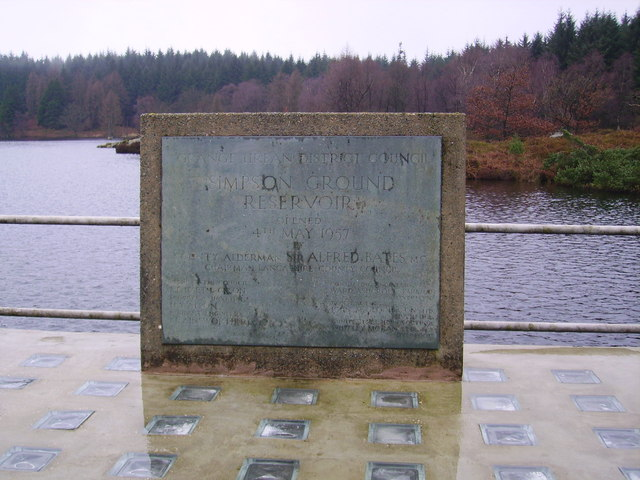
Plaque

Simpson Ground Reservoir is a reservoir in Cumbria, England, near the southeastern end of Windermere. It is located within a Forestry Commission conifer plantation, to the east of Staveley-in-Cartmel and provides fresh water supply for Grange-Over-Sands and the Haweswater aqueduct to Barrow.

The reservoir, which covers an area of 6.89 hectares (17.0 acres), was established in 1957. The reservoir, at an altitude of 193 metres (633 feet), measures 455 m × 194 m (1,493 ft × 636 ft), and has a capacity of 44 million gallons. A plaque near the bank commemorates the opening of the reservoir on 4 May 1957 by the Lancashire County Council.
