= Ayside =

Hamlet in Cumbria, England

Coordinates: 54.243°N 2.934°W

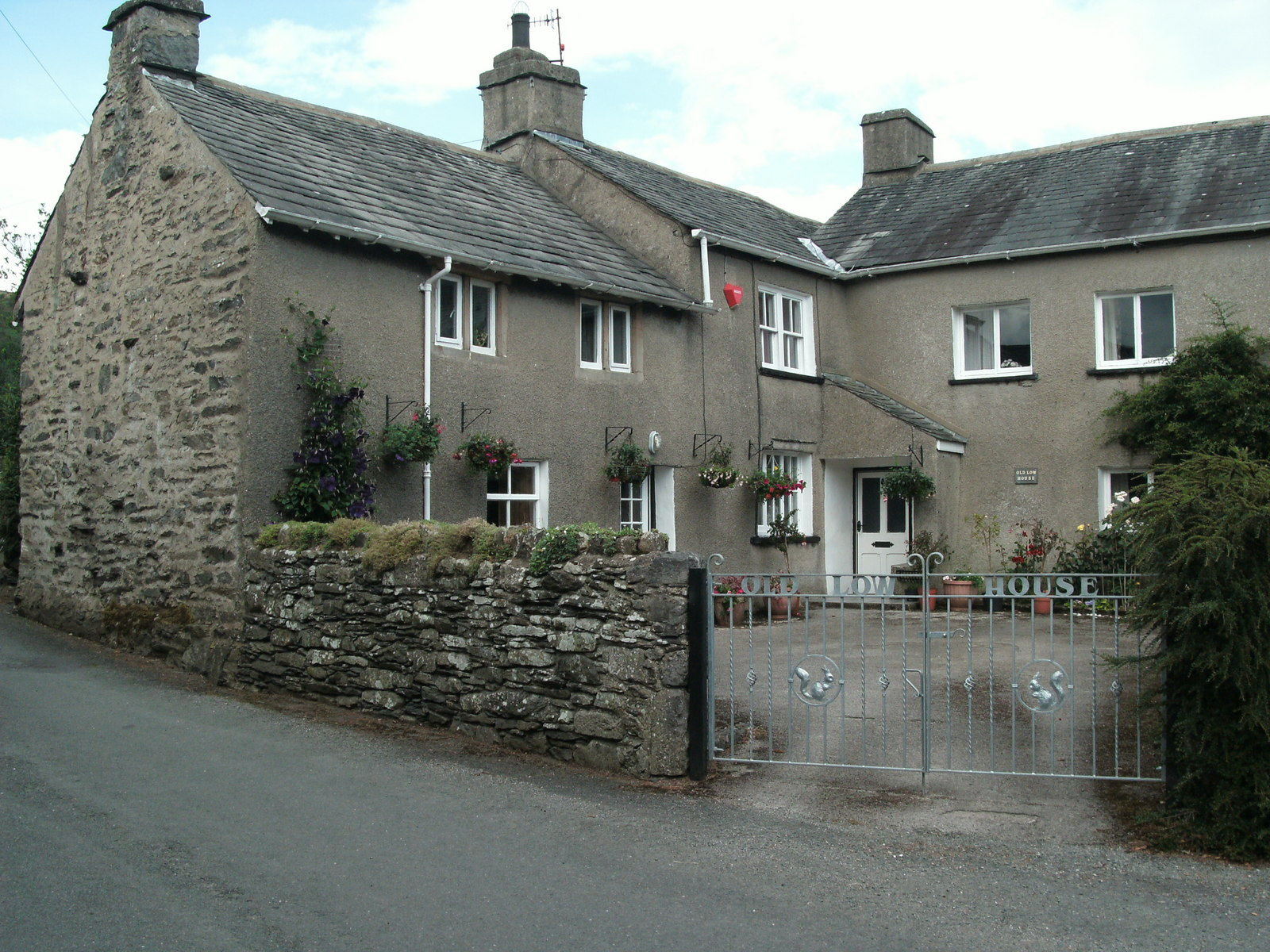
- Old Low House, Ayside

- Location in South Lakeland Location within Cumbria
- OS grid reference: SD391834
- Civil parish: Staveley-in-Cartmel
- Unitary authority: Westmorland and Furness
- Ceremonial county: Cumbria
- Region: North West
- Country: England
- Sovereign state: United Kingdom
- Post town: GRANGE-OVER-SANDS
- Postcode district: LA11
- Dialling code: 015395
- Police: Cumbria
- Fire: Cumbria
- Ambulance: North West
- UK Parliament: Westmorland and Lonsdale

Ayside is a hamlet on the A590 road, in the Westmorland and Furness Unitary Authority, in the county of Cumbria, England.
