= Levens Hall =

Manor house in Cumbria, England

Coordinates: 54.2590°N 2.7764°W

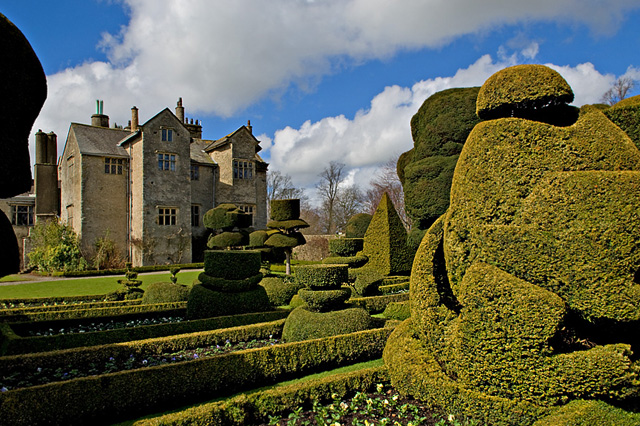
Levens Hall in 2008

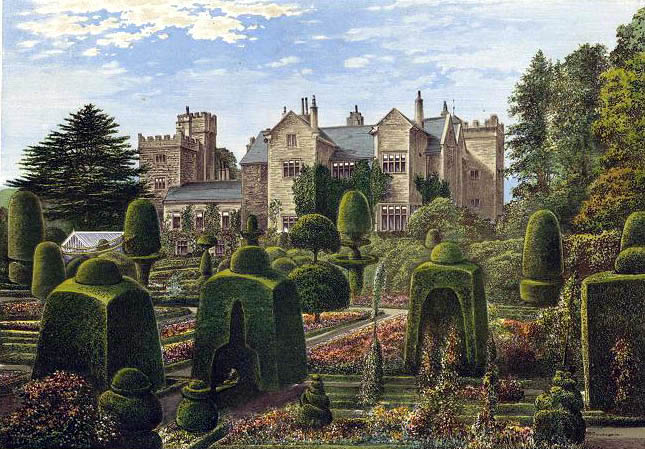
Levens Hall, from Francis Orpen Morris's Country Seats (1880)

Levens Hall and the topiary in 1833 when the estate was the seat of the Hon. Colonel Fulke-Greville Howard

Levens Hall is a manor house in the Kent valley, near the village of Levens and 5 miles (9 km) south of Kendal in Cumbria, Northern England.

== History ==
The first house on the site was a pele tower built by the Redman family in around 1350. Much of the present building dates from the Elizabethan era, when the Bellingham family extended the house. The Bellinghams, who were responsible for the fine panelling and plasterwork in the main rooms, sold the house and estate in 1689 to Colonel James Grahme, or Graham, Keeper of the Privy Purse to King James II. Grahme made a number of additions to the house in the late 17th century. His son Henry Graham was a knight of the shire for Westmorland.

Further additions were made in the early 19th century.

Levens is now owned by the Bagot family and is open to the public. The small collection of steam road vehicles includes several traction engines which are usually steamed on Sundays and Bank Holidays.

In October 2021, the building was one of 142 sites across England to receive part of a £35-million injection into the government's Culture Recovery Fund.

In the 1960s, Levens Hall was reportedly haunted by a Grey Lady.

== Gardens ==
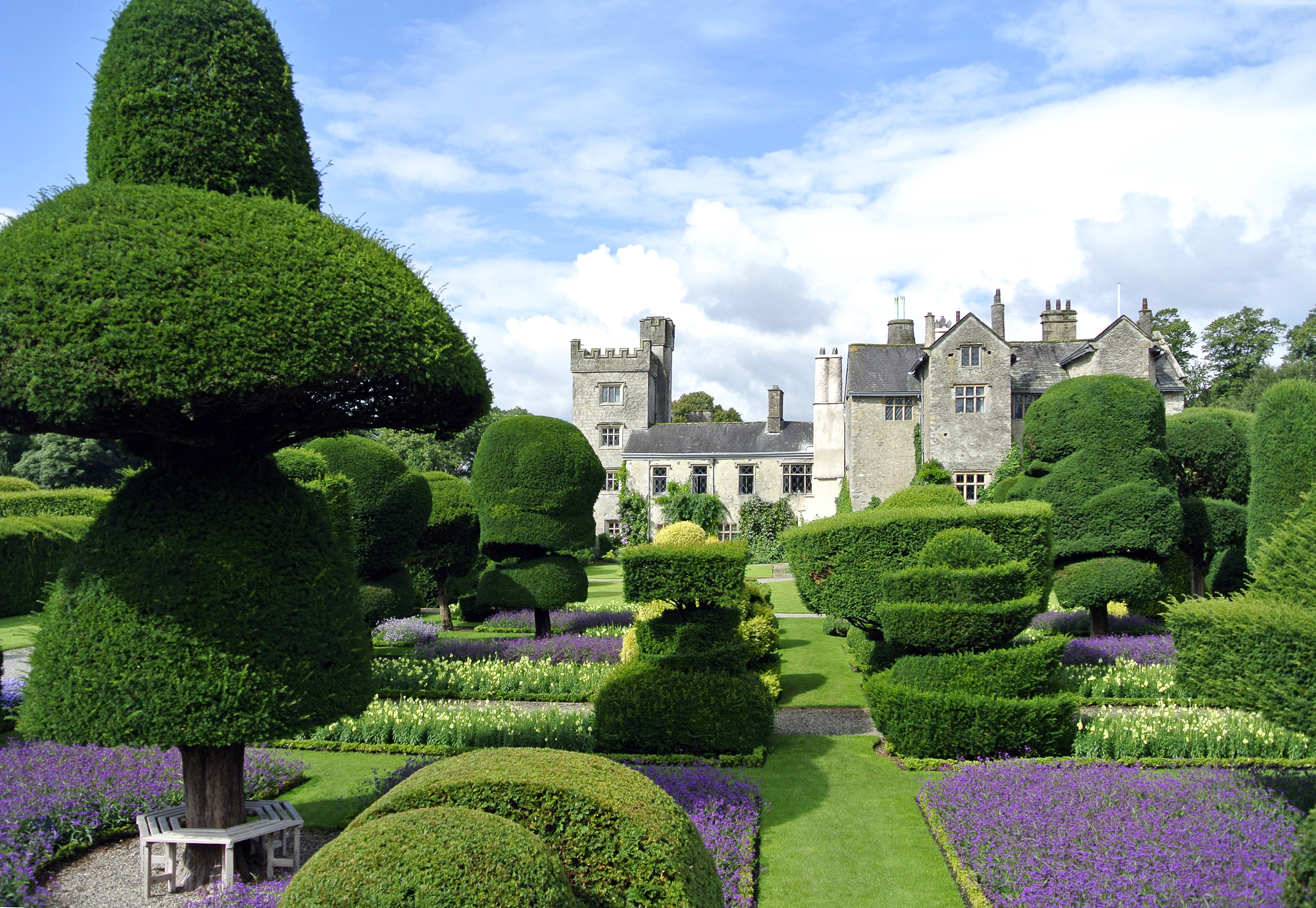
Topiary at Levens Hall

Levens has a celebrated and large topiary garden, which was first created by the French gardener Guillaume Beaumont, the gardener of King James II and the designer of the grounds at Hampton Court. Beaumont also planned the tree planting in the deer park, now inhabited by black fallow deer and Bagot goats.

The park and gardens laid out by Beaumont between 1689 and 1712 have survived remarkably intact. They have been described as retaining "almost all of the essential elements of the completed scheme as shown on maps of the park and gardens of 1730". In December 2021 the gardens were featured in the BBC series Gardeners' World.

== In popular culture ==
Levens Hall posed as Baskerville Hall for the 2002 BBC production of The Hound of the Baskervilles.

== See also ==
- Grade I listed buildings in Cumbria
- Listed buildings in Levens, Cumbria
