= Grange Fell Church, Grange-Over-Sands =

Coordinates: 54.19221°N 2.92129°W

Grange Fell Church
- Grange Fell Church
- Denomination: Church of England
- Churchmanship: Anglican
- Website: Grange Fell Church, Grange-over-Sands

Administration
- Province: Province of York
- Diocese: Diocese of Carlisle

Clergy
- Vicar: The Reverend Jonathan Brewster

Grange Fell Church commonly referred to by locals as the Fell Church is a Church of England church in the Grange Fell area of Grange-over-Sands, Cumbria, England. It was built in 1907. Its benefice is united with those of St Mary, Allithwaite, St Mary and St Michael, Cartmel, St Peter, Field Broughton, St John the Baptist, Flookburgh, St Paul, Grange-over-Sands, and St Paul, Lindale, to form the benefice of Cartmel Peninsula.

== History ==
A parish magazine of 1898 states "an afternoon service at the church room on Grange Fell has been recommenced for the winter months". This 'room' was in the home of Nell Smith who provided accommodation so people in the area could worship regularly. The present building was built in 1907, it was dedicated on 26 April 1907 year by John Diggle, Bishop of Carlisle.

== Today ==
The church is part of the Diocese of Carlisle, Archdeaconry of Westmorland & Furness and the Deanery of Windermere. Inside Windermere it is part of the parish of St. Paul Grange-over-Sands along with St Paul Parish Church in the town centre, both of which share the same vicar who is, The Reverend Andrew Norman (September 2019).

Grange Fell Cemetery is a short distance away.
