= St Mary's Church, Staveley =

Coordinates: 54.2653°N 2.9543°W

- Church of St Mary, Staveley-in-Cartmel
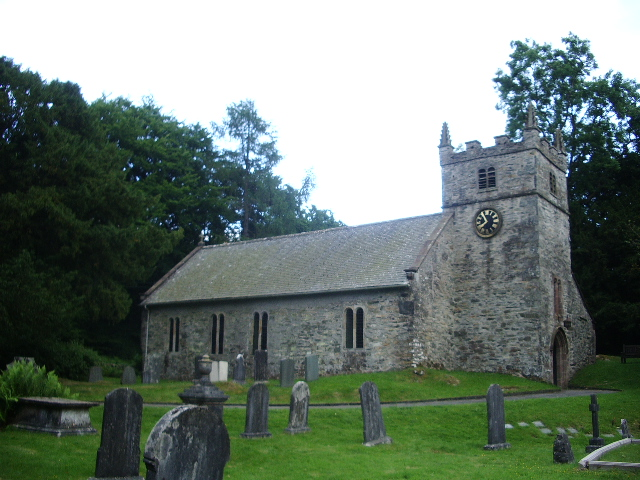
- St Mary's Church, Staveley, from the northwest

- Location in Cumbria
- OS grid reference: SD 379,859
- Location: Staveley-in-Cartmel, Cumbria
- Country: England
- Denomination: Anglican
- Website: St Mary, Staveley-in-Cartmel

History
- Status: Parish church

Architecture
- Functional status: Active
- Heritage designation: Grade II
- Designated: 25 March 1970
- Architect: Austin and Paley (restoration)
- Architectural type: Church
- Style: Gothic

Specifications
- Materials: Stone, slate roof

Administration
- Province: York
- Diocese: Carlisle
- Archdeaconry: Westmorland and Furness
- Deanery: Windermere
- Parish: St Mary, Staveley-in-Cartmel

Clergy
- Vicar: Canon Peter Calvert

St Mary's Church is in the village of Staveley-in-Cartmel, Cumbria, England. It is an active Anglican parish church in the deanery of Windermere, the archdeaconry of Westmorland and Furness, and the diocese of Carlisle. It is recorded in the National Heritage List for England as a designated Grade II listed building.

== History ==
A church was present on the site by 1618, and was repaired in 1678. The south aisle and the tower date possibly from 1793. The church was restored in 1897 by the Lancaster architects Austin and Paley. The restoration included removal of pews, reroofing and reseating the church, and replacing the stone arcade with one in timber. Its estimated cost was £1,000 (equivalent to £110,000 as of 2025).

== Architecture ==
The church is constructed in stone rubble with slate roofs. Its plan consists of a nave and a chancel in one range, a south aisle, and a west tower with a vestry to its south. The tower has a west doorway, with a two-light window above it. The paired bell openings are round-headed, and the battlemented parapet has crocketed pinnacles at the corners. There is a clock face on the north side. On the sides of the church are two-light round-headed windows. The east window has three lights.

Inside the church is a five-bay oak arcade, and a 19th-century open timber roof. The furniture dates from the 19th century and includes a simple octagonal font, and a timber pulpit decorated with traceried panels. The two-manual pipe organ is located at the east end of the south aisle, and was built by Wilkinson of Kendal in 1870.

== External features ==
In the churchyard, standing on an outcrop of rock, is an 18th-century stone sundial. This consists of a square pier with a moulded base and cap. The plate and gnomon are missing. The sundial is listed at Grade II.

== See also ==
- Listed buildings in Staveley-in-Cartmel
- List of ecclesiastical works by Austin and Paley (1895–1914)
