= St John the Baptist's Church, Flookburgh =

Coordinates: 54.1760°N 2.9737°W

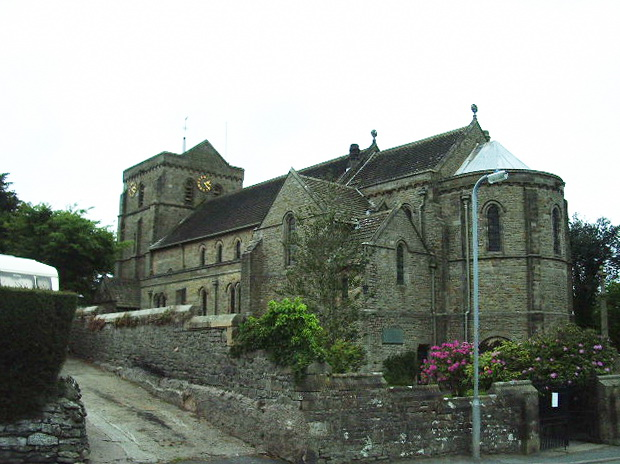
- St John the Baptist's Church, Flookburgh, from the southeast

- Location in Cumbria
- OS grid reference: SD 366,760
- Location: Flookburgh, Cumbria
- Country: England
- Denomination: Anglican
- Website: St John the Baptist, Flookburgh

History
- Status: Parish church
- Dedication: John the Baptist
- Consecrated: 1900

Architecture
- Functional status: Active
- Heritage designation: Grade II*
- Designated: 25 March 1970
- Architect: Austin and Paley
- Architectural type: Church
- Style: Romanesque Revival
- Groundbreaking: 1897
- Completed: 1900
- Construction cost: £12,000

Specifications
- Materials: Sandstone

Administration
- Province: York
- Diocese: Carlisle
- Archdeaconry: Westmorland and Furness
- Deanery: Windermere
- Parish: St John, Flookburgh

Clergy
- Vicar: Revd Ferial Etherington

St John the Baptist's Church is in Station Road in the village of Flookburgh, on the Cartmel Peninsula in Cumbria, England. It is an active Anglican parish church in the deanery of Windermere, the archdeaconry of Westmorland and Furness, and the diocese of Carlisle. Its benefice is united with those of St Mary, Allithwaite, St Mary and St Michael, Cartmel, St Peter, Field Broughton, St Paul, Grange-over-Sands, Grange Fell Church, Grange-Over-Sands, St Paul, Lindale, St Mary Staveley-in-Cartmel, St Anne Haverthwaite and St Peter Finsthwaite to form the benefice of Cartmel Peninsula. The church is recorded in the National Heritage List for England as a designated Grade II* listed building.

== History ==
St John's was designed by the Lancaster architects Austin and Paley, and paid for by Victor Cavendish. It replaces an older church built in 1777 on a site nearby, which in turn was a rebuilding of a chapel dating back to at least the 16th century. The foundation stone was laid in 1897 by Lady Evelyn Cavendish, and the church was consecrated in 1900. Its original estimated cost was £8,000, but it finally cost £12,000 (equivalent to £1,280,000 in 2025).

== Architecture ==
=== Exterior ===
The church is constructed in pale sandstone, dressed to be almost smooth, with ashlar dressings and bands. It is roofed in sandstone flags, other than the apse, which has a lead roof. The architectural style is Romanesque. Its plan consists of a four-bay nave with a clerestory, north and south three-bay aisles, a west tower, a south porch, and a chancel with a chapel to the north, an organ chamber to the south, and a semicircular apse to the east with a vestry beneath. The church stands on a sloping site, with the tower at the top, and the rest of the church stepped down the slope. The tower is in three stages, with buttresses, a corbelled coped parapet, and a saddleback roof with gables on the east and west sides. On the west side of the tower are paired lancet windows in the bottom stage, a round-headed lancet window with zigzag moulding in the middle stage, and paired louvred bell openings in the top stage. On the south side of the tower is a porch with two open quatrefoils in its gable. Above this is a lancet window and a single bell opening. The north side has a gabled stair turret, a lancet window, and a single bell opening. On the east side is a pair of bell openings. There are clock faces on all sides. The windows in the body of the church are round-headed lancets, single or in pairs. Each bay of the clerestory contains a two-light window.

=== Interior ===
The three-bay arcade is carried on quatrefoil piers. All the furnishings were designed by the architects, and are "very good in a quiet way". Also in the nave are creed and commandment boards dating from the 18th century, and the royal arms of George III. In the chancel is a trefoil-headed sedilia. All the stained glass is by Shrigley and Hunt, dating from about 1901 to 1927, the newest window depicting Saint Cuthbert preaching. The organ has two manuals; its builder is not known. There is a ring of eight bells, all cast by John Taylor & Co; four date from 1900, two from 1949, and two from 2008.

== See also ==
- Grade II* listed buildings in Westmorland and Furness
- Listed buildings in Lower Holker
- List of ecclesiastical works by Austin and Paley (1895–1914)
