= St Mary's Church, Allithwaite =

Coordinates: 54.1830°N 2.9429°W

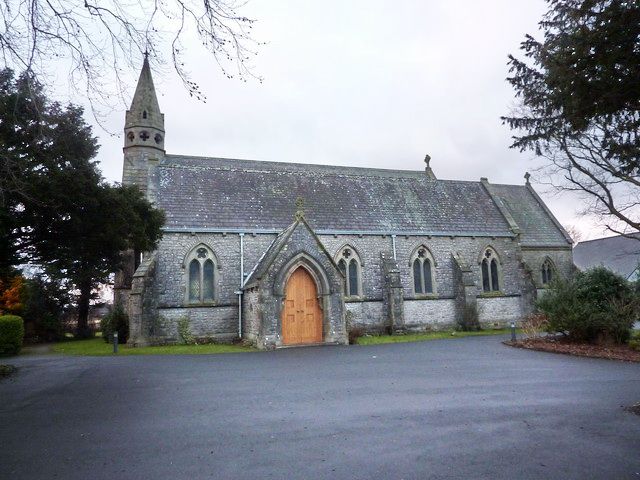
- St Mary's Church, Allithwaite, from the south

- Location in Cumbria
- OS grid reference: SD 38558 76774
- Location: Allithwaite, Cumbria
- Country: England
- Denomination: Anglican
- Website: St Mary, Allithwaite

History
- Status: Parish church

Architecture
- Functional status: Active
- Architect: E. G. Paley
- Architectural type: Church
- Style: Gothic Revival
- Groundbreaking: 1864
- Completed: 1865

Specifications
- Materials: Limestone with sandstone dressings Slate roofs

Administration
- Province: York
- Diocese: Carlisle
- Archdeaconry: Westmorland and Furness
- Deanery: Windermere
- Parish: St Mary, Allithwaite

Clergy
- Rector: Revd Canon Nicholas John Ash

St Mary's Church is in the village of Allithwaite, Cumbria, England. It is an active Anglican parish church in the deanery of Windermere, the archdeacon of Westmorland and Furness, and the diocese of Carlisle. Its benefice is united with those of St Mary and St Michael, Cartmel, St Peter, Field Broughton, St John the Baptist, Flookburgh, St Paul, Grange-over-Sands, Grange Fell Church, Grange-Over-Sands, and St Paul, Lindale to form the benefice of Cartmel Peninsula. The church is recorded in the National Heritage List for England as a designated Grade II listed building.

== History ==
The church was built in 1864–65 and designed by the Lancaster architect E. G. Paley. At the same time Paley designed the village school and vicarage. These were financed by Miss Mary Winfield Lambert of Boarbank Hall, who died in 1857 and bequeathed £2,500 (equivalent to £240,000 in 2025) towards the church, £1,000 for the school, and £1,500 for the vicarage.

== Architecture ==
St Mary's is constructed in rock-faced limestone; it has sandstone ashlar dressings, and slate roofs. The architectural style is Decorated. Its plan consists of a five-bay nave with a south aisle under a separate roof, a south porch, and a two-bay chancel with a chapel and organ loft to the north. At the west end is an octagonal bell turret surmounted by a spire-let. Internally, the arcade is carried on round piers. The font is square and plain, carried on an octagonal shaft. The pulpit is carved with corbelled triangular arches. In the east window is stained glass from 1921 by Morris & Co. The stained glass in the east window in the aisle dates from 1950 and is by Abbot and Company. Also in the aisle are two windows with a musical theme, designed by Paul G. Chapman. The two-manual organ was designed by Albert Keates, and was restored in about 1930.

== See also ==
- Listed buildings in Lower Allithwaite
- List of ecclesiastical works by E. G. Paley
