= St John the Evangelist's Church, Woodland =

Coordinates: 54.29195°N 3.15796°W

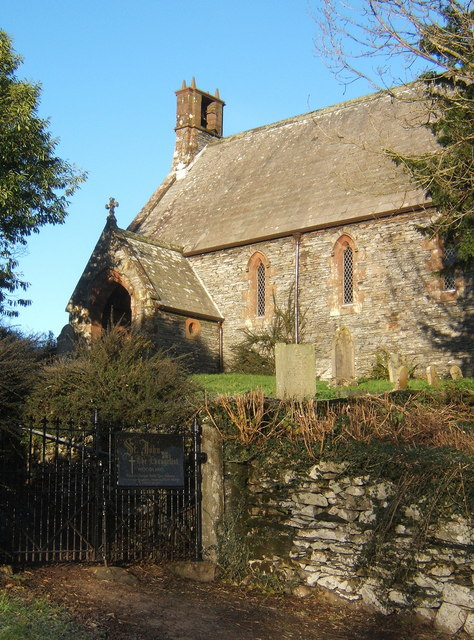
- St John the Evangelist's Church, Woodland, from the southeast

- Location in Cumbria
- OS grid reference: SD 24725 89098
- Location: Woodland, Cumbria
- Country: England
- Denomination: Anglican
- Website: St John the Evangelist, Woodland

Architecture
- Architect: E. G. Paley
- Architectural type: Church
- Groundbreaking: 1864
- Completed: 1865
- Construction cost: Nearly £1,000

Administration
- Province: York
- Diocese: Carlisle
- Archdeaconry: Westmorland and Furness
- Deanery: Furness
- Parish: Broughton and Duddon

Clergy
- Priest: Revd Stephen Tudway

St John the Evangelist's Church is in the hamlet of Woodland, about 4 kilometres (2 mi) to the northeast of Broughton-in-Furness, Cumbria, England. It is an active Anglican parish church in the deanery of Furness, the archdeaconry of Westmorland and Furness, and the diocese of Carlisle. Its benefice is united with those of St Mary Magdalene, Broughton-in-Furness, Holy Innocents, Broughton Mills, St John, Ulpha, and Holy Trinity, Seathwaite.

The church was built in 1864–65, and was the third church to be built on the site. The earlier churches had been built in 1698 and 1822. The present church was designed by the Lancaster architect E. G. Paley, having been designed by him in 1862. It cost nearly £1,000 (equivalent to £110,000 in 2025), and provided seating for 150 people. In 1868–69 a parsonage was built for the church, which was also designed by Paley.

St John's is a small and simple church, like many other churches nearby, consisting of only a nave and an apse. It has a flat-topped bellcote, which is surmounted by four small spikes, each in the form of an obelisk.

== See also ==
- List of ecclesiastical works by E. G. Paley
