= Levens, Cumbria =

Village in Cumbria, England

Coordinates: 54.268°N 2.789°W

Levens
- Village and parish
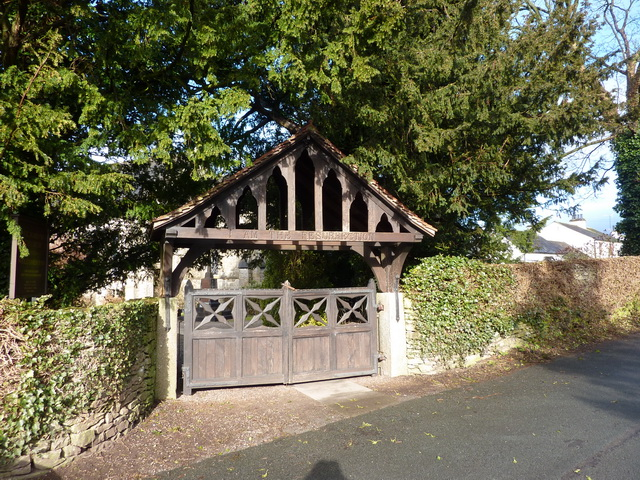
- Lych gate at St John's Church

- Location in the former South Lakeland district Location within Cumbria
- Population: 1,049 (2011)
- OS grid reference: SD4886
- Civil parish: Levens
- Unitary authority: Westmorland and Furness
- Ceremonial county: Cumbria
- Region: North West
- Country: England
- Sovereign state: United Kingdom
- Post town: KENDAL
- Postcode district: LA8
- Dialling code: 01539
- Police: Cumbria
- Fire: Cumbria
- Ambulance: North West
- UK Parliament: Westmorland and Lonsdale

Levens is a village and civil parish in Westmorland and Furness, Cumbria. It lies within the historic county of Westmorland. In the 2001 census the parish had a population of 1,007, increasing at the 2011 census to 1,049. The village lies four miles (6.4 km) south of Kendal off the A6 and A590 roads. Levens Hall is within the parish.

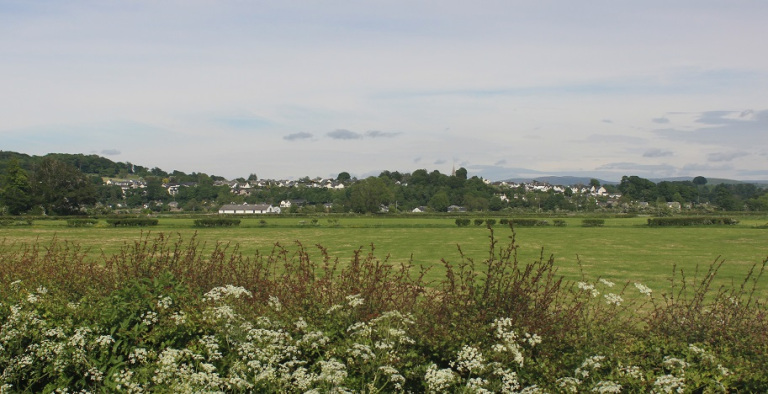
Levens, seen from the west.

== Governance ==
An electoral ward in the same name exists. This ward stretches from Helsington, then south to Heversham. The total ward population at the 2011 Census was 2,056.

== Transport ==
The village has one route serving it run by Stagecoach Kendal to Cartmel or Kendal.

== Notable people ==
- Henry Graham (of Levens) (died 1707), landowner and member of parliament
- James Knox (born 1995), racing cyclist

== See also ==
- Listed buildings in Levens, Cumbria
