= St Paul Parish Church, Grange-over-Sands =

Coordinates: 54.1933°N 2.9098°W

St Paul's Parish Church
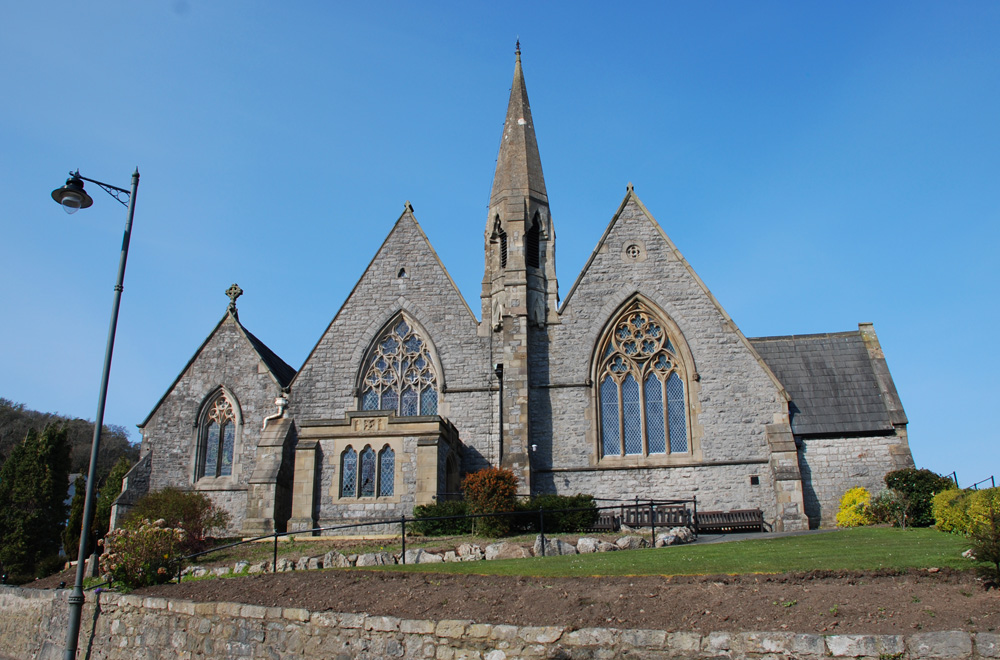
- St Paul's Church from the west

- Location in South Lakeland Location in Cumbria
- OS grid reference: SD 407,779
- Location: Crown Hill, Grange-Over-Sands, Cumbria
- Country: England
- Denomination: Anglican
- Website: St Paul, Grange-over-Sands

History
- Status: Parish church
- Consecrated: 13 October 1853

Architecture
- Functional status: Active
- Heritage designation: Grade II
- Designated: 2 May 1975
- Architect(s): J. Murray, T. D. Barry, Henry Paley
- Architectural type: Church
- Style: Gothic Revival
- Groundbreaking: 1852
- Completed: 1933

Specifications
- Materials: Limestone, sandstone dressings, slate roofs

Administration
- Province: York
- Diocese: Carlisle
- Archdeaconry: Westmorland and Furness
- Deanery: Windermere
- Parish: St Paul, Grange-over-Sands

Clergy
- Rector: Revd Jonathan Brewster

St Paul's Church is in Crown Hill, Grange-over-Sands, Cumbria, England. It is an active Anglican parish church in the deanery of Windermere, the archdeaconry of Westmorland and Furness, and the diocese of Carlisle. Its benefice is united with those of St Mary, Allithwiate, St Mary and St Michael, Cartmel, St Peter, Field Broughton, St John the Baptist, Flookburgh, Grange Fell Church, Grange-Over-Sands, and St Paul, Lindale, to form the benefice of Cartmel Peninsula. The church is recorded in the National Heritage List for England as a designated Grade II listed building.

== History ==
In 1851 an appeal was opened by Sarah Anne Clarke from Liverpool to build a church in the town. This resulted in a church designed by J. Murray being built in 1852–53. This consisted of a nave, a short chancel, a porch, and a baptistry. The foundation stone was laid by the Earl of Burlington in October 1852, and the church was consecrated on 13 October 1853 by Rt Revd John Graham, Bishop of Chester. It was expanded by T. D. Barry of Liverpool by the addition of a north aisle in 1861, and a south aisle in 1867. The north aisle cost £662, and the south aisle £1,180. In 1875, the chancel was lengthened, and an organ chamber was added. At this stage, the church was re-consecrated on 6 June 1876 by the Rt Revd Harvey Goodwin, Bishop of Carlisle. It became a parish church in its own right on 14 April 1884. A north porch was added in 1904. In 1912 it was planned to rebuild the church, but this was prevented by the First World War. After the war, the church was improved when the chancel and the south aisle were lengthened, and vestries and a south porch were added by Henry Paley of the Lancaster architects Austin and Paley in 1932–33. The interior of the church was re-ordered in the 1950s.

== Architecture ==
The church is constructed in limestone with sandstone dressings and slate roofs. Its plan consists of a nave, north and south aisles, a south porch, and chancel with a polygonal apse. At the west end is a bell turret topped by a stone spirelet. Inside the church are five-bay arcades carried on marble piers with sandstone capitals. Also in the church are two pairs of churchwardens' stalls dating from the 20th century, and a wooden font. The east window in the south chapel dates from 1888 and was designed by S. Evans; the other windows date from the 20th century and are by Shrigley and Hunt or by Abbott and Company. The two-manual pipe organ was built in 1873 by William Hill and Son, and restored in 1933 by Wilkinson and Son of Kendal.

== See also ==
- Listed buildings in Grange-over-Sands
- List of ecclesiastical works by Austin and Paley (1916–44)
