= St Peter's Church, Field Broughton =

Coordinates: 54.2280°N 2.9419°W

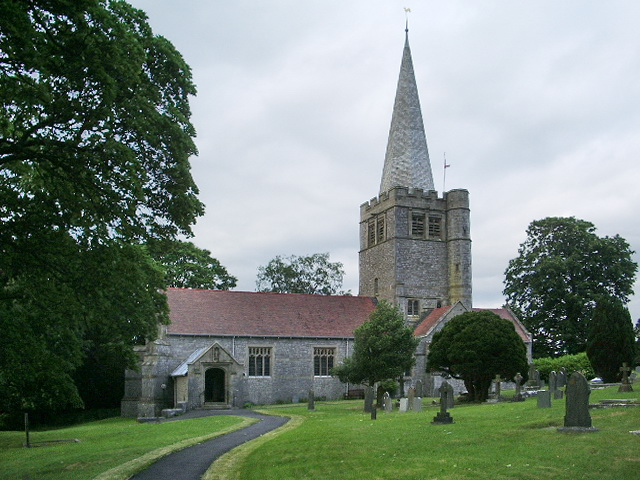
- St Peter's Church, Field Broughton, from the south

- Location in Cumbria
- OS grid reference: SD 387,818
- Location: Field Broughton, Cumbria
- Country: England
- Denomination: Anglican
- Website: St Peter, Field Broughton

History
- Status: Parish church
- Founded: 1745
- Dedication: Saint Peter
- Consecrated: 29 June 1894

Architecture
- Functional status: Active
- Heritage designation: Grade II*
- Architect: Paley, Austin and Paley
- Architectural type: Church
- Style: Gothic Revival
- Groundbreaking: 10 May 1892
- Completed: 1894

Specifications
- Materials: Limestone with sandstone dressings Red tiled roof, shingled spire

Administration
- Province: York
- Diocese: Carlisle
- Archdeaconry: Westmorland and Furness
- Deanery: Windermere
- Parish: St Peter, Field Broughton

Clergy
- Rector: Nicholas John Ash

St Peter's Church is in the village of Field Broughton, Cumbria, England. It is an active Anglican parish church in the deanery of Windermere, the archdeaconry of Westmorland and Furness, and the diocese of Carlisle. Its benefice is united with those of St Mary, Allithwiate, St Mary and St Michael, Cartmel, St John the Baptist, Flookburgh, St Paul, Grange-over-Sands, Grange Fell Church, Grange-Over-Sands, and St Paul, Lindale, to form the benefice of Cartmel Peninsula. The church is recorded in the National Heritage List for England as a designated Grade II* listed building.

== History ==
The original church on the site was a chapel of ease to Cartmel Priory built in 1745. In 1875 Field Broughton became a separate parish, but by 1880 the chapel was in a poor condition and was inadequate for its purpose. The current church was designed by the Lancaster firm of architects, Paley, Austin and Paley. Its foundation stone was laid on 10 May 1892, and the church was consecrated by the Rt Revd John Bardsley, bishop of Carlisle on St Peter's Day, 29 June 1894. The church cost between £7,500 and £8,000. The parish was united with that of Lindale-in-Cartmel in 1971, and in 1997 it became part of the Cartmel Peninsula Team Ministry.

== Architecture ==
=== Exterior ===
St Peter's is constructed in limestone with sandstone dressings and a red tiled roof. At the crossing is a shingled spire, which rises to 110 feet (34 m). The plan of the church is cruciform, and consists of a three-bay nave, a south porch, a steeple above the crossing, north and south transepts with extensions to the west forming single-bay aisles, a chancel, and a north vestry. Its architectural style is free Perpendicular. The south porch is gabled, and above the entrance is a niche containing a statue. The three straight-headed windows along the south side of the nave contain Perpendicular tracery. The west end of the church has large buttresses, a four-light window and a gable cross. Along the north side of the aisle are windows with three or four lights. On the southeast corner of the tower is a stair turret. The bell openings have two lights and are louvred. The parapet is coped and embattled. On top of the tower is a recessed spire with a weathercock. The transepts are buttressed, and contain three-light windows with Perpendicular tracery. The east side of the church has a five-light window with Perpendicular tracery, and a gable cross. On the north and south sides of the chancel are two-light straight-headed windows.

=== Interior ===
The interior of the church is lined with dressed sandstone. The fittings were designed by the architects. The pulpit, altar, and pews are timber. The octagonal font stands at the west end of the church and is in Dent fossil marble; it has a cover dating from 1965. In the chancel are a sedilia and a piscina. The reredos is in alabaster. There are two more fonts in the church. The one in the south transept is also octagonal, is made of Portland stone, and is carved on four of its faces with the symbols of the Four Evangelists. The smallest font, which measures 18 inches (0.46 m) high and stands in a niche, was moved from the old chapel. On the south side of the church are stained glass windows by Kempe dated 1894 and 1898. On the north side is a window by Morris & Co. dating from 1920. Also on the north side of the church, and in the north transept, are windows by Abbott and Company of Lancaster. The two-manual organ was made by Forster and Andrews in 1894.

== See also ==
- Grade II* listed buildings in Westmorland and Furness
- Listed buildings in Broughton East
- List of works by Paley, Austin and Paley
