= Barber Green =

Coordinates: 54.23°N 02.93°W

- Village
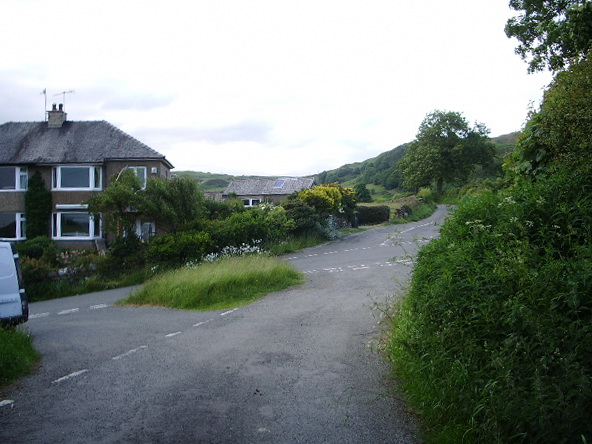
- Junction at Barber Green

- Location in the former South Lakeland district Location within Cumbria
- OS grid reference: SD3982
- Civil parish: Staveley-in-Cartmel
- Unitary authority: Westmorland and Furness
- Ceremonial county: Cumbria
- Region: North West
- Country: England
- Sovereign state: United Kingdom
- Post town: GRANGE-OVER-SANDS
- Postcode district: LA11
- Dialling code: 015395
- Police: Cumbria
- Fire: Cumbria
- Ambulance: North West
- UK Parliament: Westmorland and Lonsdale

Barber Green is a hamlet in Cumbria, England.
