= Royal Windermere Yacht Club =

- Burgee

- Ensign
- Short name: RWYC
- Founded: 1860
- Location: Fallbarrow Road, Bowness-on-Windermere, Cumbria, England.
- Commodore: Richard Jennings 2026-27
- Website: http://www.rwyc.co.uk

The Royal Windermere Yacht Club is a sailing club which was founded in 1860, situated at Fallbarrow Road, Bowness-on-Windermere, Cumbria, England.

== History ==
The first recorded yacht race was to be held on Windermere in 1818, using, as its land base, the inn at Ferry Nab. However, the race was not to be, the wind was then, as it is now, and that is unpredictable! (or in the case of 1818, absent). Undeterred, the hardy souls who wished to race were not put off and racing in an 'ad hoc' manner, continued for many years. Indeed, the regatta of 1824 was witnessed by illustrious figures including Sir Walter Scott, William Wordsworth and Robert Southey. This 'ad hoc' affair gained in popularity and became increasingly organised.

The Windermere Sailing Club was founded in 1860 and started to organise yacht racing on Windermere in a more formal manner. In doing so, it introduced limits on size and handicapping for different types of yacht. However, the club members were not averse to stretching the rules on size, apparently taking the line that everything not mentioned in the rules was permissible. This rule bending resulted in the construction of a 'one design' class, where all racing yachts had to conform to rather more stringent parameters than had hitherto been the case. This resulted in the first 'Windermere' class racing yacht, having a waterline of 22'

In 1887 Sir William Forwood acquired the Royal Warrant for the club. This was on the occasion of the Diamond Jubilee of Queen Victoria.

The 22' Windermere Class continued to be the only racing yachts on the lake for many years. But, in 1904 a new class was proposed. The design brief for the boat was that it should be cheap, easy to handle, suitable for amateurs, capable of being taken out quickly and may be sailed single handed if necessary. The design evolved into the Windermere 17' class yachts, or as they were called in those days, the 'second class' yachts.

The 22' and 17' fleets co-existed quite nicely for several years, but eventually the 22' class dwindled, with fewer and fewer new boats being built. This apparent malaise also set in with the 17' class, so that by 1914, the entire fleet of the club numbered 14 boats. In 1922, the club introduced the 19' class. This was not a popular class as construction prices had increased markedly, following the Great War and there were plenty of 17' boats still in use. The 19' fleet often sailed in handicap races with the 17' fleet.

== Dinghies ==
On 23 October 1948, the club decided that something must be done to encourage more people to sail on Windermere. The decision they took on that date was to introduce sailing dinghies. The decision was not accepted with universal jubilation; the proposed club dinghy was to be the 'Firefly' many members were of the opinion that a dinghy would be unsafe on the lake and that catastrophe was inevitable. They might also attract 'young people'!

In 1951, the club agreed to introduce a second dinghy class. The GP14 fleet came into being. The GP was seen as a much more suitable family boat than the firefly, which was designed solely for racing. The GP Fleet remains popular with club members and a strong racing fleet can be seen on the lake during the season.

== Racing Fleets ==
Racing at RWYC is divided into six classes. They are;

- Windermere 17' class yachts
- Flying Fifteen (keelboat)
- GP14
- RS400 (Dinghy)
- Laser dinghy
- Mirror (dinghy)
