= Lindale and Newton-in-Cartmel =

Civil parish in Cumbria, England

Coordinates: 54.182°N 2.941°W

- Lindale Church

- Location within Cumbria
- Population: 842 (2011 census)
- Civil parish: Lindale and Newton-in-Cartmel
- Unitary authority: Westmorland and Furness
- Ceremonial county: Cumbria
- Region: North West
- Country: England
- Sovereign state: United Kingdom

Milestone in High Newton

Lindale and Newton-in-Cartmel, formerly Upper Allithwaite (sometimes Allithwaite Upper) is a civil parish in the Westmorland and Furness unitary authority, in the ceremonial county of Cumbria, England. Historically it is in the county of Lancashire. The spelling Lindale and Newton in Cartmel, without hyphens, is used by the parish council.

The parish includes the villages of Lindale, High Newton and Low Newton and lies north of Grange-over-Sands.

The parish has an area of 1,390.08 hectares (3,435.0 acres) and in the UK census 2011 had a population of 842.

== History ==
Upper Allithwaite was formerly a township in the parish of Cartmel, in 1866 Upper Allithwaite became a civil parish in its own right. The parish was renamed from "Upper Allithwaite" to "Lindale and Newton-in-Cartmel" on 16 April 2018 as the new name provides a clearer description of the geographical area.

== Listed buildings ==
There are 15 listed buildings or structures in the parish, including St Paul's church, Lindale and the grade II* listed Barrow Wife, a former Quaker meeting house dated 1677 and now a private house.
