= LA postcode area =

Postcode area within the United Kingdom

Lancaster
- Postcode area
- Location within the United Kingdom
- Coordinates: 54.173°N 2.907°W
- Sovereign state: United Kingdom
- Postcode area: LA
- Postcode area name: Lancaster
- Post towns: 17
- Postcode districts: 23
- Postcode sectors: 66
- Postcodes (live): 11,800
- Postcodes (total): 14,678
- Statistics as at May 2020

The LA postcode area, also known as the Lancaster postcode area, is a group of 23 postcode districts in north-west England, within 17 post towns. These cover north Lancashire (including Lancaster, Morecambe and Carnforth) and southern Cumbria (including Barrow-in-Furness, Kendal, Ulverston, Windermere, Dalton-in-Furness, Milnthorpe, Sedbergh, Grange-over-Sands, Askam-in-Furness, Kirkby-in-Furness, Broughton-in-Furness, Coniston and Ambleside and Millom), and part of North Yorkshire.

Mail for the LA postcode area is processed at Preston Mail Centre, along with mail for the PR, BB and FY postcode areas.

== Coverage ==
The approximate coverage of the postcode districts:

Postcode district	Post town	Coverage	Local authority area(s)
LA1	LANCASTER	Lancaster, Aldcliffe, Bailrigg	City of Lancaster
LA2	LANCASTER	Lancaster, Abbeystead, Aldcliffe, Aughton, Austwick, Bailrigg, Bay Horse, Caton, Clapham, Cockerham, Dolphinholme, Ellel, Farleton, Galgate, Glasson Dock, Halton, Hest Bank, High Bentham, Hornby, Quernmore, Tatham, Wharfe	City of Lancaster, North Yorkshire, Wyre
LA3	MORECAMBE	Morecambe, Heysham, Middleton, Overton, Sunderland Point	City of Lancaster
LA4	MORECAMBE	Morecambe, Torrisholme	City of Lancaster
LA5	CARNFORTH	Carnforth, Arnside, Silverdale, Warton, Bolton-Le-Sands	City of Lancaster, Westmorland and Furness
LA6	CARNFORTH	Arkholme, Burton-in-Kendal, Burton in Lonsdale, Cantsfield, Casterton, Ingleton, Ireby, Kirkby Lonsdale, Masongill, Tunstall, Whittington	City of Lancaster, North Yorkshire, Westmorland and Furness
LA7	MILNTHORPE	Milnthorpe, Beetham, Storth, Heversham	Westmorland and Furness
LA8	KENDAL	Brigsteer, Grayrigg, Levens, Sedgwick, Sizergh	Westmorland and Furness
LA9	KENDAL	Kendal, Burneside, Natland, Oxenholme	Westmorland and Furness
LA10	SEDBERGH	Sedbergh, Dent, Lunds	Westmorland and Furness, North Yorkshire
LA11	GRANGE-OVER-SANDS	Grange-over-Sands, Allithwaite, Cark, Cartmel, Field Broughton, High Newton, Lindale, Low Newton, Meathop and Ulpha, Witherslack	Westmorland and Furness
LA12	ULVERSTON	Ulverston, Aldingham, Backbarrow, Gleaston, Graithwaite, Haverthwaite, Leece, Lindal-in-Furness, Newbiggin (Furness), Newby Bridge, Staveley-in-Cartmel, Urswick	Westmorland and Furness
LA13	BARROW-IN-FURNESS	Barrow-in-Furness (east), Newton-in-Furness, Piel Island, Rampside, Roa Island, Roose, Stainton with Adgarley	Westmorland and Furness
LA14	BARROW-IN-FURNESS	Barrow-in-Furness (west), Walney Island	Westmorland and Furness
LA15	DALTON-IN-FURNESS	Dalton-in-Furness	Westmorland and Furness
LA16	ASKAM-IN-FURNESS	Askam-in-Furness	Westmorland and Furness
LA17	KIRKBY-IN-FURNESS	Kirkby-in-Furness	Westmorland and Furness
LA18	MILLOM	Millom	Cumberland
LA19	MILLOM	Waberthwaite, Bootle	Cumberland
LA20	BROUGHTON-IN-FURNESS	Broughton-in-Furness	Westmorland and Furness
LA21	CONISTON	Coniston, Torver	Westmorland and Furness
LA22	AMBLESIDE	Ambleside, Chapel Stile, Elterwater, Grasmere, Hawkshead, Near Sawrey, Skelwith Bridge	Westmorland and Furness
LA23	WINDERMERE	Windermere, Bowness-on-Windermere, Troutbeck	Westmorland and Furness

== Map ==
LA postcode area map, showing postcode districts in red and post towns in grey text, with links to nearby BB, BD, CA, DL, FY and PR postcode areas.

== See also ==
- Postcode Address File
- List of postcode areas in the United Kingdom
