= A590 road =

Trunk road in north west England

A590

Route information
- Length: 34 mi (55 km)

Major junctions
- North East end: M6 Junction 36 nr. Kendal; 54.2368°N 2.7179°W
- A65; M6 A591; A6 A5074 A592 A5092 A5087 A595
- South West end: Vickerstown, Walney Island, Barrow-in-Furness; 54.0976°N 3.2578°W

Location
- Country: United Kingdom
- Primary destinations: Barrow-in-Furness

Road network
- Roads in the United Kingdom; Motorways; A and B road zones

The A590 is a trunk road in southern Cumbria, in the north-west of England. It runs north-east to south-west from junction 36 of the M6 motorway, through the towns of Ulverston and Barrow-in-Furness to terminate at Biggar Bank on Walney Island. The road is a mixture of dual carriageway and single carriageway, with the section east of Low Newton to the M6 being mainly dual. Further dual sections are south of Newby Bridge, south of Greenodd and south of Ulverston. The road is the main route for tourists entering the southern Lake District. It has often humorously been described as "the longest cul-de-sac in the world".

== Route ==
=== M6 to Ulverston ===
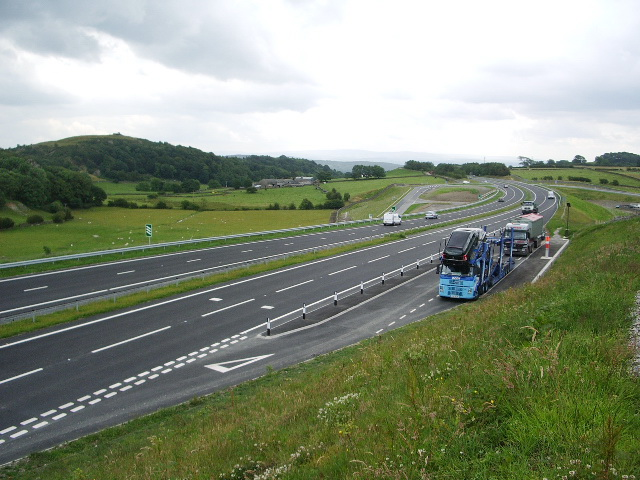
A590 by-pass at High and Low Newton

From east to west, the A590 originally terminated at the A6 road at Levens Bridge. Its route followed a number of country roads via a series of Turn Off To Stay On (TOTSO)s, passing through a number of villages including Lindale, High Newton, Low Newton, Newby Bridge and Greenodd into the larger town of Ulverston. This road formed a large part of the southern boundary of the Lake District National Park upon its formation in 1951.

This stretch of road has now undergone a series of improvements and route alignments. In the mid-1970s, the A591 'Kendal link road' was built between Junction 36 of the M6 and Kendal with an extension of the A590 also being constructed to join this as part of the wider Lancashire expressways plans. This improvement to the A590 also included a realignment and dualling of the road to the west as far as High Newton, by-passing Lindale. In the mid-1990s the A590 was extended eastward through a re-numbering of the A591 between Sizergh and the M6, providing a single road between Barrow-in-Furness and the M6.

West of the Lindale bypass is the road's most recent improvement, a 2.4-mile (3.8-kilometre) long stretch of dual carriageway built to bypass High and Low Newton at a cost of £35.3 million. This new stretch of road was constructed to a high environmental standard and achieved a CEEQUAL Award following its opening in Spring 2008. It connects to the original route to the east of Newby Bridge. The A590 reaches its most northern point at the foot of Windermere, before following the route of the River Leven to its estuary at Greenodd. Both the villages of Backbarrow and Greenodd have now been by-passed, though parts of this route remain narrow and winding. West of Greenodd the road switches between sections of single and dual carriageway.

=== Ulverston-Walney Island ===
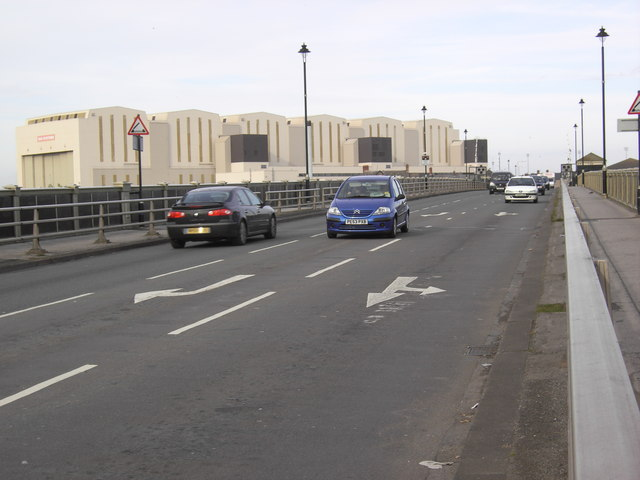
A590 crossing Walney Bridge in Barrow-in-Furness

The A590 passes through Ulverston, avoiding its most central streets, along an inner relief road. West of Ulverston the road is entirely single carriageway and is mainly used for commuting between Ulverston, Barrow-in-Furness and the small towns in-between the two. West of Dalton-in-Furness, the A590 follows an entirely different route to that it did prior to the early 1990s when Dalton was bypassed. Previously, the road had gone through Dalton and entered Barrow along the wide Victorian Abbey Road, before passing through Barrow's shipyard onto Barrow Island.

Since 1992, the road has followed a modern bypass close to the South Lakes Safari Zoo and enters Barrow via its north-western industrial area, parallel to Walney Island passing the site of Barrow's former iron and steelworks. A one way system opened in April 2008 now applies to the road as it passes closest to the centre of Barrow, with westbound traffic heading towards the town centre at Craven Park roundabout and eastbound traffic continuing through the industrial land alongside Walney Channel. The road continues westward over the Jubilee Bridge onto Walney Island and terminates at the Irish Sea
