= Lindale, Cumbria =

Village in Cumbria, England

Coordinates: 54.216°N 2.894°W

Lindale
- The Lindale Inn public house, Lindale, seen in 2009

- Location in South Lakeland Location within Cumbria
- OS grid reference: SD417804
- Civil parish: Lindale and Newton-in-Cartmel
- Unitary authority: Westmorland and Furness
- Ceremonial county: Cumbria
- Region: North West
- Country: England
- Sovereign state: United Kingdom
- Post town: GRANGE-OVER-SANDS
- Postcode district: LA11
- Dialling code: 01539
- Police: Cumbria
- Fire: Cumbria
- Ambulance: North West
- UK Parliament: Westmorland and Lonsdale

Lindale - traditionally Lindale in Cartmel - is a village in the south of Cumbria. It lies on the north-eastern side of Morecambe Bay, England. It is located in the historic county of Lancashire. It is in the civil parish of Lindale and Newton-in-Cartmel, in Westmorland and Furness Unitary Authority. It is bypassed, to the north, by the A590 road, and is on the B5277 which leads to Grange-over-Sands from the A590.

== History ==
Lindale's most famous resident was John "Iron-Mad" Wilkinson, an ironworker and inventor who lived in the village from 1750, where he owned the Castle Head estate. He produced the iron for and helped design the world's first iron bridge (at Ironbridge and Broseley) and he made the world's first iron boat in 1787. A large iron obelisk stands in the village as memorial to him.

Traditionally a farming village, Lindale's proximity to the A590 road has seen a growth in the number of commuters who live there. It is also a centre for car showrooms. The local tourist boom has largely missed Lindale, with nearby Grange-over-Sands developing into a seaside resort, and villages to the north and west (such as Windermere) benefiting from their position in the Lake District National Park.

== St Paul's Church ==
St Paul's church is a grade II listed building of 1828–29. It was designed by architect George Webster. Webster, whose practice was based in Kendal, had a house in Lindale.

It includes stained glass by Shrigley and Hunt of Lancaster. The church closed in 2019 as a result of a declining congregation and costs of repair.

== See also ==
- Listed buildings in Lindale and Newton-in-Cartmel
- Listed buildings in Grange-over-Sands
