= Pelland Engineering =

British engineering company

Pelland Engineering was a British engineering company that produced kit cars and made an attempt on the world land-speed record for steam cars.

== The Pelland Sports ==
On his return from Australia, Peter Pellandine set up Pelland Engineering at Thetford, Norfolk. In 1979, he began to manufacture kit cars developed from his Pellandini steam car. The two-seater Pelland Sports used the Volkswagen Beetle drivetrain but mounted backwards to create a mid-engined configuration. This was intended to enhance the dynamic characteristics of the car. The body shell was a GRP monocoque with VW front torsion bar suspension but Pellandine's own design traverse-leaf arrangement at the rear. It was essentially a roadster but a gull-wing hardtop was available.

The design was sold to Ryder Cars of Coventry in 1980 who marketed it as the Rembrandt and explored the feasibility of replacing the flat4 VW engine with a midmounted water cooled Ford Kent Crossflow engine. The company was then sold on to Graham Autos based in Tyneside. Very few cars were built by either business and some time later it was sold again to Listair.

Listair subtly updated the styling in the late 1980s and sold it as the Dash. They also offered the option of an Alfa Romeo Alfasud engine.

Dash Sports Cars of Chesterwood, Hereford then took on the project in 1990.

Around 1996/7 the project was sold to Richard Bell who moved from England and took the project with him to Dana Point in Southern California. Bell still owns 3 examples of the cars and continues to research the history of the marque.

Chris Evans based near Inverness, Scotland is the Owner, Secretary & Treasurer of the Pelland Rembrant Register. The club boasts a small membership but as at April 2009 has located 19 surviving examples. Chris, himself, owns five cars of which two are complete runners whilst two of the others are undergoing restoration and the last one is in the final stages of modification prior to it being used as a basis to produce fresh moulds. This latest derivation, (Name to be decided), is a little larger and more practical but retains the character of Peter Pellandine's original creation.

Paul Pellandine built the first two VW powered versions in South Australia and the first UK model in 1979. He still has his now sky blue car in Northern NSW Australia completely restored.

The Dash demo car and moulds were passed on to Mel Hubberd of Manx Buggies in Norfolk, England.

== The Pelland Steamer ==
Pelland Steamer
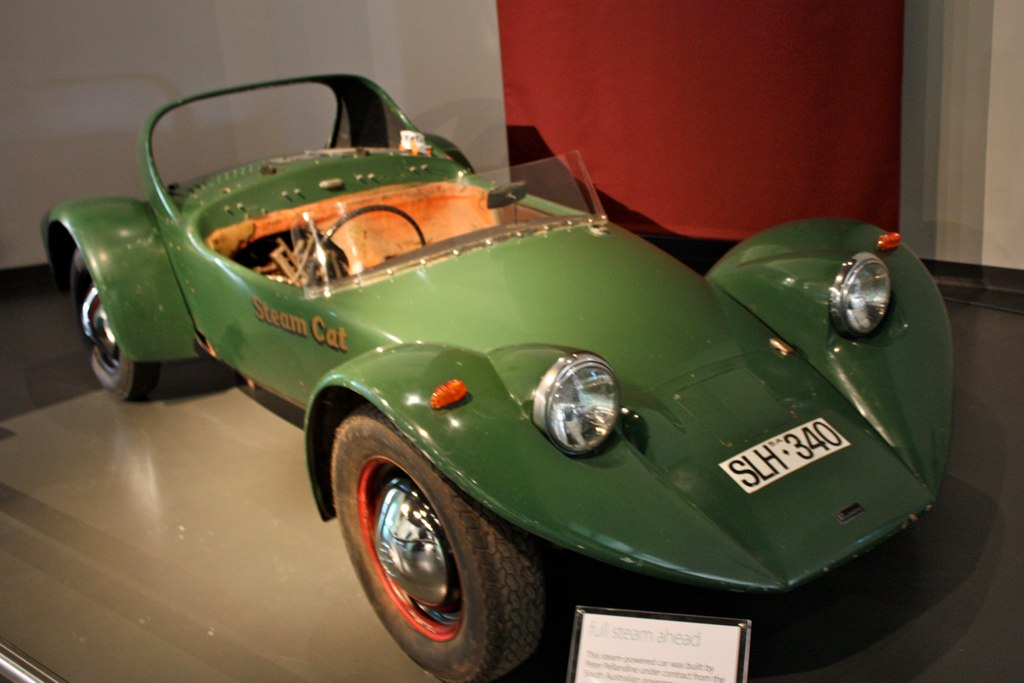

Overview
- Manufacturer: Pelland Engineering
- Production: 1977
- Designer: Peter Pellandine

Body and chassis
- Body style: Roadster
- Layout: Rear Engine, RWD

Powertrain
- Engine: 6 litres (6,000 cc; 370 cu in) single cylinder Steam engine
- Power output: 160 brake horsepower (160 PS; 120 kW); 1,500 newton-metres (1,100 lbf⋅ft)
- Transmission: 1-speed Direct Drive

Dimensions
- Wheelbase: 2,889 millimetres (113.7 in)
- Length: 4,767 millimetres (187.7 in)
- Width: 1,700 millimetres (67 in)
- Height: 1,081 millimetres (42.6 in)
- Kerb weight: 480 kilograms (1,060 lb)

The Pelland Sports formed the basis of the first Pelland steam car called "The Steam Cat" This was the same fibreglass monocoque chassis and used a twin-cylinder double-acting compound engine. The car was built to a contract with the South Australian Government in 1974. It currently is at the National Motor museum at Birdwood South Australia. In 1977 the Pelland Mk II Steam Car was built. It was a project Pellandine had originally started in Australia with funding from the Australian government. It had a three-cylinder double-acting engine in a 'broad-arrow' configuration. This was mounted in a tubular steel chassis, with a Kevlar body giving a gross weight of just 1,050 lb (480 kg). Uncomplicated and robust, the steam engine was claimed to give trouble-free, efficient performance. It had huge torque (1,100 ft⋅lbf (1,500 N⋅m)) at zero engine revs, and could accelerate from 0 to 60 mph (97 km/h) in under 8 seconds.

Pellandine's intention was to break the world land-speed record for steam cars which stood at 127.66 mph (205.45 km/h). He made a number of attempts to set a record, but was repeatedly thwarted by technical problems. The last attempt was in 1991. Subsequently sold at Christie's, this historic car can be viewed at the Lakeland Motor Museum in Backbarrow, Cumbria.

Pellandine moved back to Australia in the 1990s where he continued to develop the Steamer. The latest version is the Mark IV.

== The Pelland Sports Mk II ==
Peter Pellandine marketed an all-new version of his Pelland Sports in 1989. It also used a GRP monocoque but with bespoke double-wishbone suspension and a mid-mounted Alfa Romeo Alfasud powertrain. It was available in both roadster and coupé versions with traditional-style doors, rather than the gullwings of earlier projects. The car's roadholding was described as "superb" by Kitcars International magazine.

== See also ==
- Pellandini Cars – the predecessor company, in Australia
