= Grange-over-Sands =

Town in Cumbria, England

Coordinates: 54.190°N 2.915°W

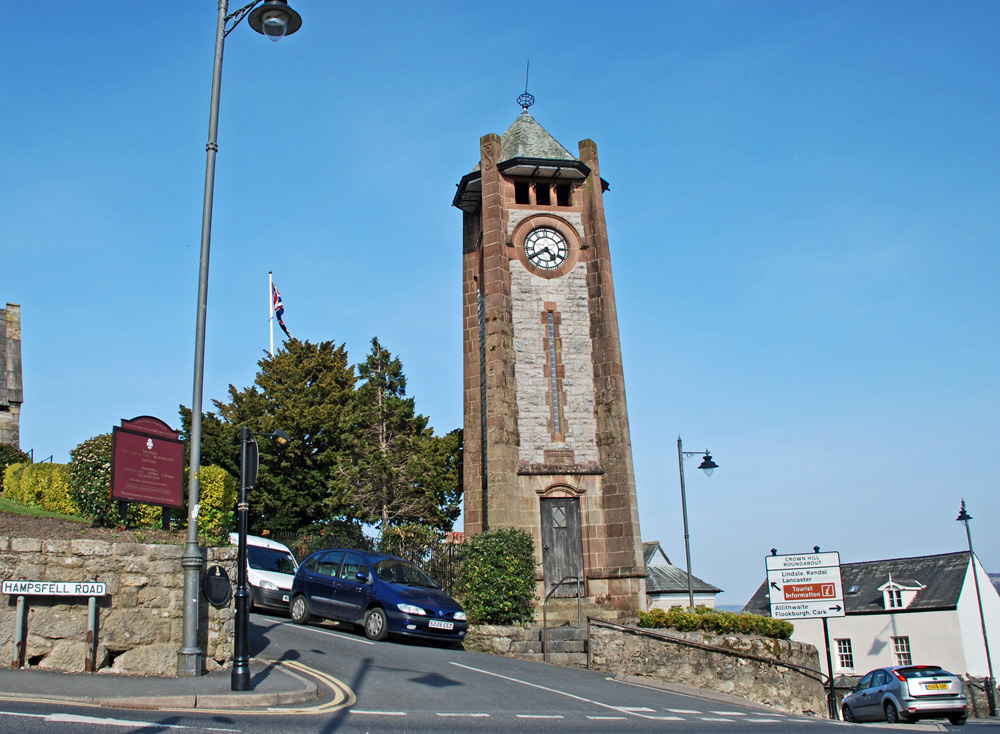
- Church Hill

- Location on Morecambe Bay Location within Cumbria
- Population: 4,279 (2021)
- OS grid reference: SD4077
- Civil parish: Grange-over-Sands
- Unitary authority: Westmorland and Furness
- Ceremonial county: Cumbria
- Region: North West
- Country: England
- Sovereign state: United Kingdom
- Post town: GRANGE-OVER-SANDS
- Postcode district: LA11
- Dialling code: 015395
- Police: Cumbria
- Fire: Cumbria
- Ambulance: North West
- UK Parliament: Westmorland and Lonsdale

Grange-over-Sands is a town and civil parish on the north side of Morecambe Bay in Cumbria, England, a few miles south of the Lake District National Park. In the 2011 census the parish had a population of 4,114, increasing at the 2021 census to 4,279. Within the boundaries of the historic county of Lancashire, the town became administered as an urban district in 1894. Though the town remains part of the Duchy of Lancaster, since 2023 it has been administered as part of the Westmorland and Furness Council area.

Travelling by road, Grange-over-Sands is 13.1 miles (21.1 km) to the south of Kendal, 14.9 miles (24.0 km) to the east of Ulverston, 25 miles (40 km) to the east of Barrow-in-Furness and 28.1 miles (45.2 km) to the north of Lancaster.

== History ==
The town developed in the Victorian era from a small fishing village and the arrival of the railway in 1857 made it a popular seaside resort on the north side of Morecambe Bay, across the sands from Morecambe. The "over-Sands" suffix was added in the late 19th or early 20th century by the local vicar, who was fed up with his post going to Grange in Borrowdale near Keswick.

In 1932 Grange Lido was built on the seafront, and remained in use until 1993, in 2011 it was listed Grade II. There is a campaign to restore and re-open it (as 2019).

The River Kent used to flow past the town's mile-long promenade but its course migrated south, away from Grange. The sands or mudflats with dangerous quicksands became a grass meadow now grazed by small flocks of sheep. Following sustained easterly winds in the early part of 2007, the river began to switch its course back across the bay.

== Amenities ==
=== Sanatorium ===
The clean, sea air and local spring water were believed to be of benefit to tuberculosis sufferers, and in 1891 one of the first sanatoriums in the country was established at Meathop.

=== Swimming pool ===
In 2003 a new public swimming pool, the "Berners Pool", was opened. The pool, which cost £3.5 million, was designed by architects Hodder Associates and won a RIBA Design Award in 2004. However it suffered from high running costs and structural problems and was closed in 2006 when the Community Trust which ran it became insolvent. It was subsequently demolished in 2013 and later replaced by affordable housing.

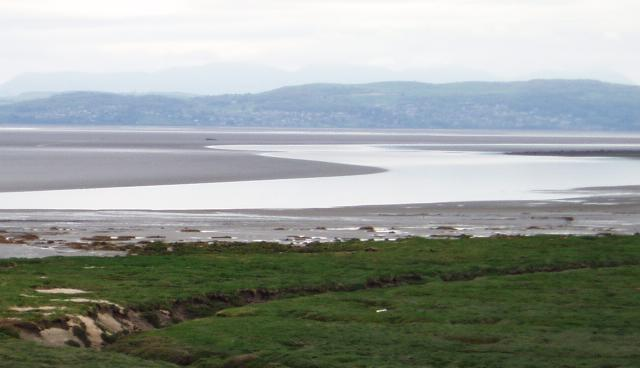
Looking across Morecambe Bay towards Grange-over-Sands

A new pool and leisure centre was subsequently planned as part of the redevelopment of the Grange Lido site. However this development was opposed as it would have involved filling in the Grade II listed lido. As of September 2018, the future of the site was still being debated.

=== Grange Lido ===
In January 2019, it was announced that the derelict Grade II listed coastal lido would be refurbished and reopened to the public, but not as a swimming pool.

In August 2019, the derelict Grange Lido opened for public tours.

=== Media ===
A local free newspaper, Grange Now, which reports on local news, is published monthly and is delivered to over 5,000 homes on the Cartmel Peninsula.

Local news and television programmes are provided by BBC North West and ITV Granada. Television signals are received from the Winter Hill TV transmitter, and the Lancaster relay transmitter.

The town is served by both BBC Radio Cumbria and BBC Radio Lancashire. Other radio stations including Heart North West, Smooth Lake District and community online stations, Lake District Radio, and Bay Trust Radio.

== Governance ==
Grange-over-Sands is part of the Westmorland and Lonsdale parliamentary constituency, of which Tim Farron is the current MP representing the Liberal Democrats.

Before Brexit, it was in the North West England European Parliamentary Constituency.

For Local Government purposes, it is in the Grange and Cartmel Ward of the Westmorland and Furness Council area. Prior to this it was in the Grange Ward of South Lakeland District Council and the Grange Division of Cumbria County Council.

The town also has its own Town Council; Grange-over-Sands Town Council.

== Education ==
There is one primary school, the Grange-over-Sands Church of England Primary School. There is no secondary school, so most pupils attend the nearby schools in either Cartmel or Milnthorpe.

== Tourism ==
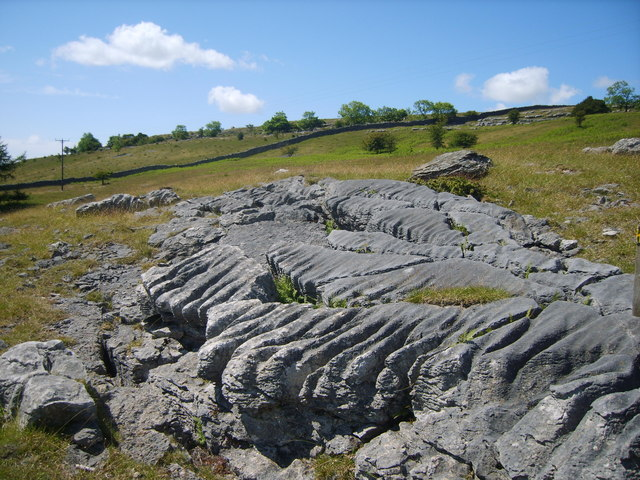
Limestone pavement on the flanks of Hampsfell

The town is a centre for tourists exploring the southern Lakeland fells, and is home to a number of hotels, bed & breakfasts and holiday properties. Within the town itself, there is an ornamental duck pond and a traffic-free promenade.

Adjacent to Grange are Lindale, to the north-east, Cartmel to the north-west, with its priory to which the village was once the 'grange' or farm, and Allithwaite to the west. Also nearby is a country house, Holker Hall, which was built on land that once belonged to the priory. The stables at Holker Hall housed the Lakeland Motor Museum until its move to Backbarrow in 2010.

In December 2019, National Geographic published an article called How to spend a weekend on the Cumbrian coast, in which it recommended that tourists should "Resist the lure of the Lake District and instead trace England’s northwest coastline by road or rail, savouring epicurean discoveries and sandy hikes along the way." The article included a recommendation for visiting Grange-over-Sands.

== Hampsfield Fell ==
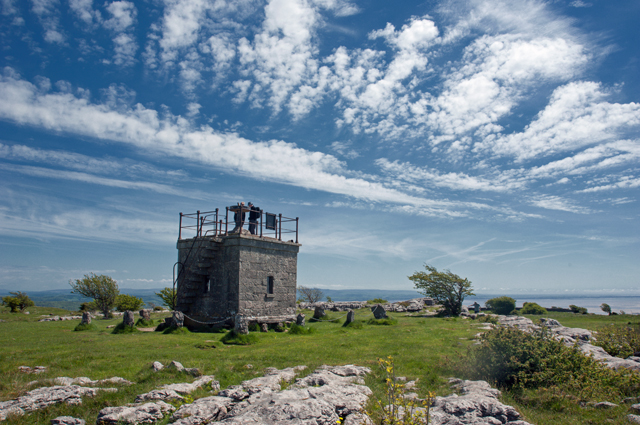
Hampsfell Hospice

Above the town is Hampsfield Fell (generally abbreviated to Hampsfell), crowned by 'Hampsfell Hospice', a sturdy limestone tower monument built in 1846 by the vicar of Cartmel. This offers shelter in bad weather and extensive views in better conditions. Over the door, which faces east, there is an inscription from Homer - 'ΡΟΔΟΔΑΚΤΥΛOΣ EΩΣ' - (RODODAKTYLOS EOS "rosy-fingered" Dawn) - whilst inside are painted boards commemorating its construction, praising the view and welcoming visitors. On the roof, which is accessible by a crude flight of stone stairs, is a crude alidade or compass pointer allowing the easy identification of nearby peaks and sights of interest. Hampsfell is the subject of a chapter of Wainwright's book The Outlying Fells of Lakeland. It reaches 727 feet (222 m). The summit of Hampsfell is surrounded by several flat, incised areas of limestone pavement.

== Transport ==
Grange-over-Sands railway station, which serves the town, was opened by the Ulverston and Lancaster Railway on 1 September 1857 and is now served by the Furness Line, giving connections to Ulverston and Barrow-in-Furness to the west, and Lancaster, Preston, Manchester Piccadilly and Manchester Airport to the east.

The town has two routes serving it both run by Stagecoach Cumbria.

The main road access is the A590, which runs between the M6 and Barrow-in-Furness. Before the building of the railway, the main way of reaching Grange was the road across the Sands of Morecambe Bay from Hest Bank.

== Notable people ==
- Jack Crayston, footballer
- Richard Palairet, cricketer
- George Mearns Savery, educator and founder of Harrogate Ladies' College
- Harry J. Scott, founding editor of the Dalesman magazine
- Len Shackleton, footballer

== See also ==
- Listed buildings in Grange-over-Sands
- Grange Fell Church, Grange-over-Sands
- Grange-over-Sands railway station
