= Autotune (Rishton) =

British manufacturer of automobiles

Autotune (Rishton) Limited
- Type: Limited company
- Industry: Automobiles
- Founded: 1975
- Founder: George Anthony Taylor; Carolyn Bridge Taylor
- Headquarters: Rishton, Lancashire
- Website: www.autotuneuk.com

Autotune (Rishton) Limited is a British manufacturer of automobiles.

== Company history ==
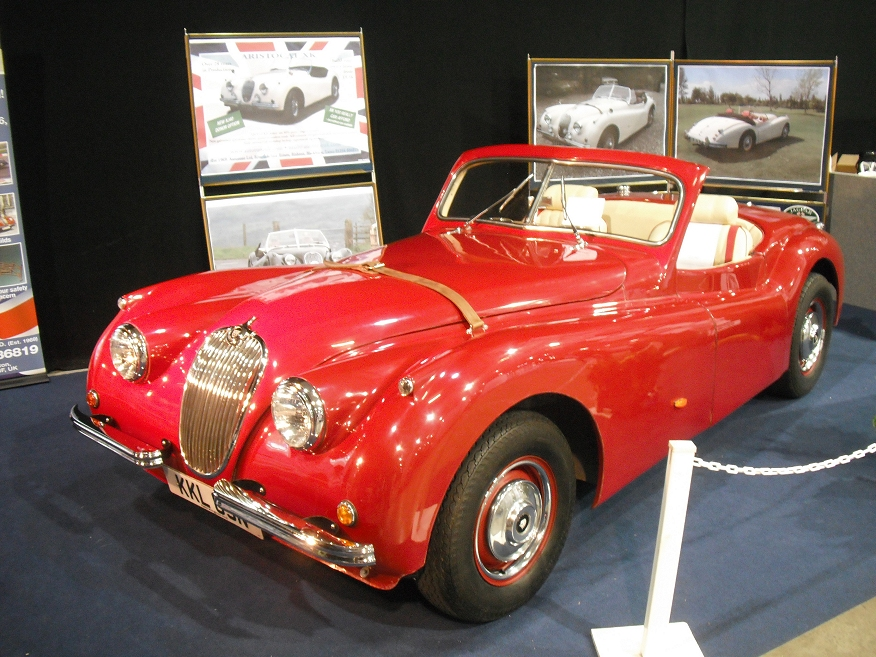
Autotune Aristocat

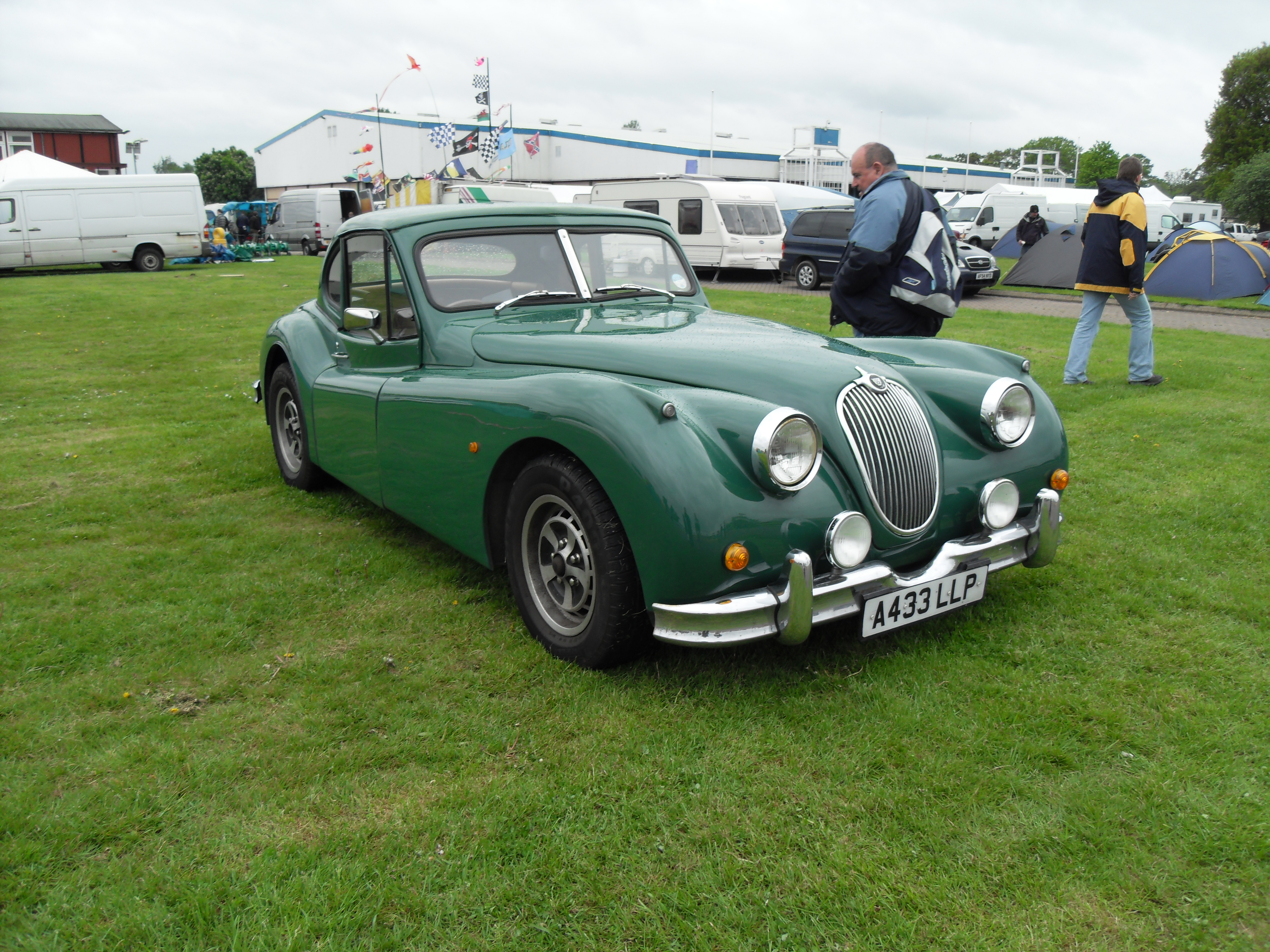
Autotune Aristocat Sports

George Anthony Taylor and Carolyn Bridge Taylor founded the company on 15 April 1975 in Rishton, near Blackburn, Lancashire. However, the company states that it has been active since 1969. Initially they worked in the field of restoration. Production of automobiles and kits began in 1983. The brand name is Autotune. A total of around 485 copies have been created so far.

== Vehicles ==
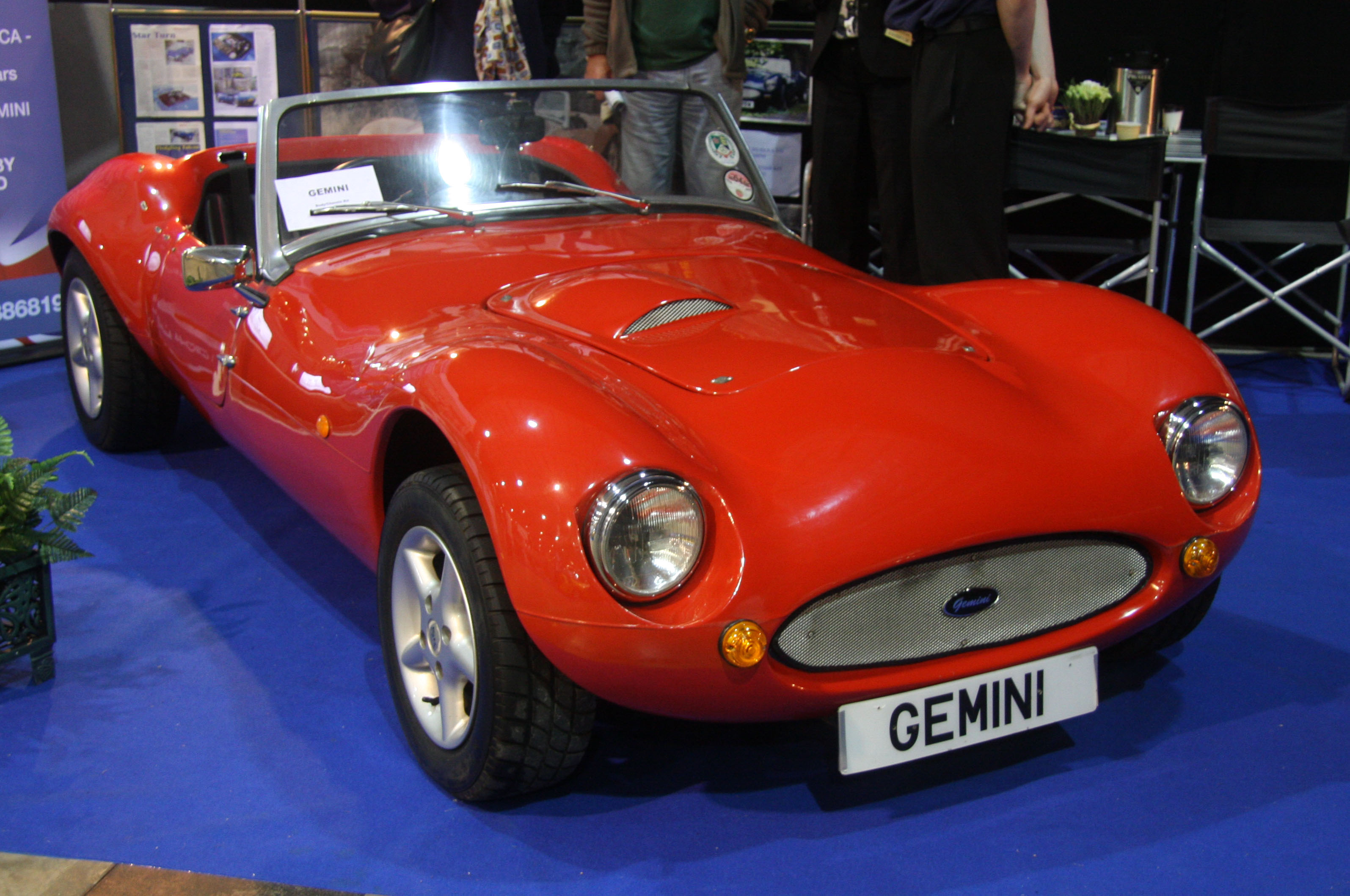
Autotune Gemini

The first Aristocat model is also the most successful model. The vehicle is based on the Jaguar XJ 6. The subframe, axles and the six-cylinder engine are used by this vehicle. The customer can choose between 2800 cm^{3}, 3400 cm^{3} and 4200 cm^{3} displacement. There is also a model with a twelve-cylinder engine with a displacement of 5300 cm^{3}. The convertible body is similar to the Jaguar XK 140, but is not a direct replica and is wider than the original. Around 300 copies have been created since 1983.

The Aristocat Sports is the coupe version of the Aristocat, but narrower and therefore more similar to the original. Around 60 copies have been sold since 1995.

The Gemini is similar to the Mk. 2 model from Falcon Cars or, according to another source, the Courier from Elva Cars. It is a two-seat roadster. The basis was initially the chassis of the second generation Ford Escort. The Ford Sierra chassis has been used since 2002. Both versions have a front engine and rear drive. There are four-cylinder engine options from Ford with 1300 cm^{3} and 1600 cm^{3} displacement as well as six-cylinder engines and a V8 engine from Rover. Around 80 copies have been created since 1988.

The Can-Am is a replica of the McLaren M 1 racing sports car from 1965. The basis is a specially manufactured chassis. Various eight-cylinder engines from Chevrolet and Rover power the vehicles. Around 45 copies have been created since 1992.

The Aquilla, a two-seater coupé introduced in 2004, remained a one-off.
