= Peter Pellandine =

British car designer & manufacturer (1927-2012)

Peter John Pellandine
- Born: 11 February 1927; West Ham, London, United Kingdom
- Occupations: Car designer, Manufacturer
- Known for: Specials/kit cars, Steam-powered vehicles

Peter John Pellandine (11 February 1927 – December 2012) was a British car designer and manufacturer who was influential in the field of specials/kit cars and steam-powered vehicles in both the United Kingdom and Australia.

== Biography ==
Peter John Pellandine was born in West Ham, London on 11 February 1927. He worked for the prestigious British coachbuilders H. J. Mulliner & Co.

=== Ashley and Falcon cars ===
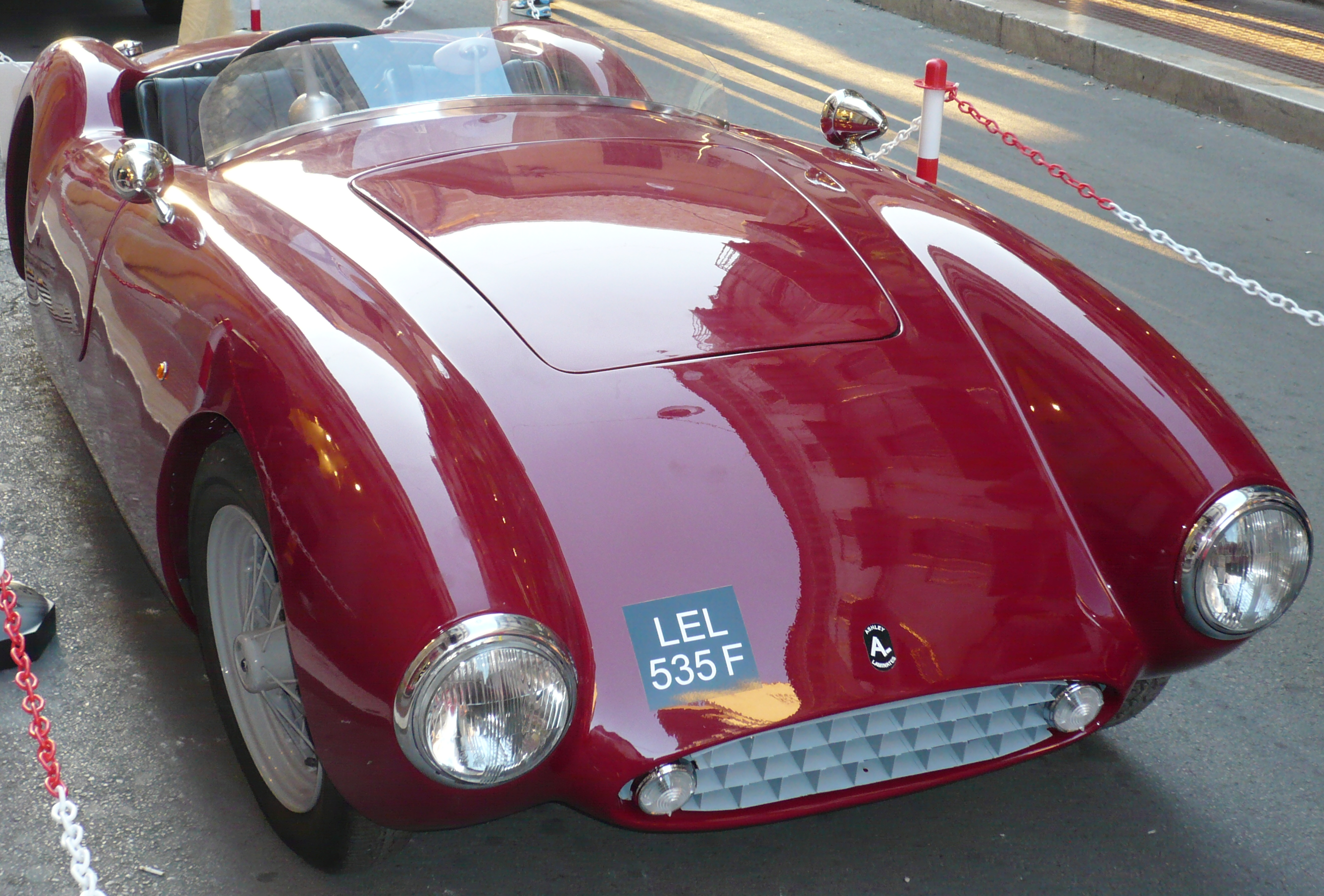
Ashley 750

In 1955 he left Mulliner's to form Ashley Laminates in partnership with Keith Waddington. The name "Ashley" was derived from the name of Pellandine's then home Ashleigh in Woodford Green. Ashley Laminates premises were first in a small garage in Epping New Road, Loughton quite close to Epping Forest.

A year later the partnership broke up amicably split and Pellandine founded Falcon Shells. Pellandine wanted to form a company he could grow and sell to enable him to emigrate. Falcon Shells was based at Waltham Abbey, and later at Hatfield. It had the rights to the short wheel base Ashley 750, which became the Falcon Mk 1 and the Ashley Sports Racer the Falcon Mk II.

Pellandine moved to New Zealand with family in 1957 and setting up a New Zealand branch of Falcon Shells, whilst continuing to operate Falcon Shells Ltd in UK. He returned to England via Australia in 1959 after closing down Falcon Shells (N.Z.). It is probable that Pellandine licensed Bill Ashton, formerly of Microplas and Weltex, and Ted George to continue making the Falcon under the Tiki brand in the 1960s. The Tiki is known to be based on the Ashley 750 body style. Pellandine continued to operate Falcon Shells Ltd in England until he sold it in 1962 to Mike Moseley and emigrated to Australia.

=== Australia and steam power ===
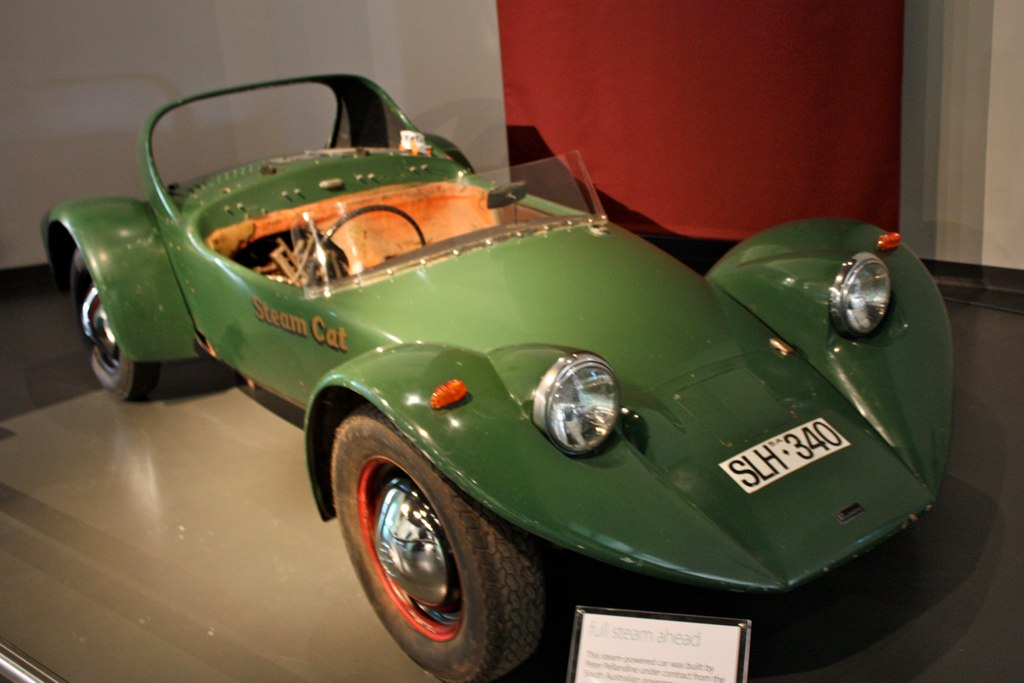
Pellandine Mk 1 Steam Car

Pellandine continued his involvement in car design at Cherry Gardens, South Australia with Pellandini Cars, which he founded in 1970. Pellandini Cars sold BMC Mini and Volkswagen based kit cars. During this time in South Australia Pellandine conducted state-sponsored experiments with a steam car. The state was seeking a solution to deal with a smog problem in Adelaide. He even made an attempt at the world steam car speed record on an Adelaide track in 1976. His car was being evaluated at about the same time as Edward Pritchard's steam-powered 1963 model Ford Falcon was being evaluated by the Australian Federal Government. Pellandine moved back to England in 1978.

Back in England at Thetford in Norfolk, he founded Pelland Engineering in 1978, which made the Volkswagen-based Pelland Sports kit car from the moulds used from 1974 in Australia. Pelland Engineering introduced its Alfa Romeo Alfasud based Pelland Sports kit car in 1989. Pellandine's design was sold to Ryder Cars in 1980, then to Graham Autos, and then to Listair. Listair remodeled the car and sold it as the Dash. From 1990 Dash Sports Cars built the remodeled car, but in the mid 1990s Richard Bell acquired the rights and moved construction to Dana Point, Southern California.

=== Pelland Steamer ===
Returning to his interest in steam-powered cars in the 1980s, Pellandine created, with Pelland Engineering, the Pelland Steamer. He hoped to break steam car landspeed record. but was unsuccessful. The Mk II is on display at the Lakeland Motor Museum in Backbarrow, Cumbria.

Pellandine moved back to Australia in the 1990s, where he continued to develop the Steamer, the final version being the Mark IV. Pellandine died in Tasmania in December 2012, at the age of 85.

== Sources ==
- Specialist Sports Cars - Peter J Filby (1974)
- Complete Encyclopedia of Motorcars 1885 to present - G.N. Georgano (1982)
- Paul Pellandine
