= Pellandini Cars =

Defunct Australian kit car manufacturer

Pellandini Cars was a manufacturer of kit cars during the early 1970s that was located in South Australia.

== History ==
Englishman Peter Pellandine founded Pellandini Cars Ltd in 1970 at Cherry Gardens, South Australia. He first produced a curvy, gull-wing coupe that used a mid-mounted BMC Mini drivetrain of 1100 or 1275cc capacity. Alloy wheels were 10-inch at the front and 12 inches at the rear. The body was made of GRP with an integral GRP chassis. The suspension points were individually mounted directly to the GRP chassis as were the engine mounts. The seats were part of the chassis and not adjustable: instead the pedals moved. Even the steering rack was bolted to the GRP bulkhead. The car weighed 480kg and did 0 to 100 km in 5 secs. It had a one-piece nose section that hinged at the front which concealed the radiator and spare wheel.

Pellandine also offered a roadster version in 1974 but these proved less popular. In all, seven coupés were sold. Most of these cars still remain, some having been rebuilt after motor racing accidents.

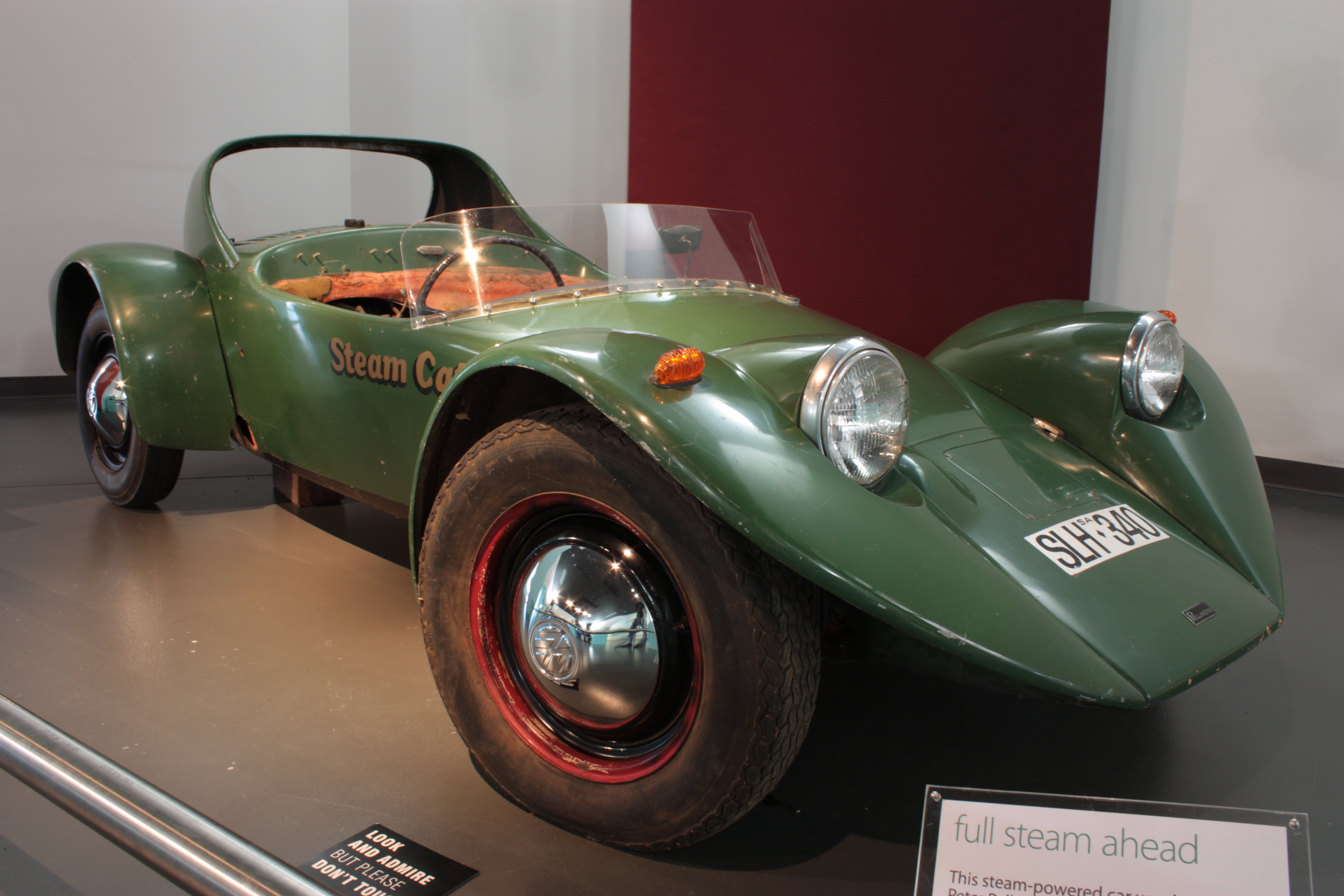
The steam car.

Pellandine also embarked on a project to build a practical steam car with a contract from the South Australian Government. It used a double-acting two-cylinder 40hp engine mounted in the rear of a two-seater, with the condenser mounted on the rear deck like a racing wing. This steam car is now at the National Motor Museum at Birdwood South Australia.

Pellandini Cars wound up in 1978 before Pellandine returned to England, where he produced two further models both using a fibreglass monocoque chassis and mid-mounted engines.

== See also ==
- Pelland Engineering – the successor company, in the UK
