= Grange Lido =

Outdoor swimming pool in Grange-over-Sands, Cumbria, England

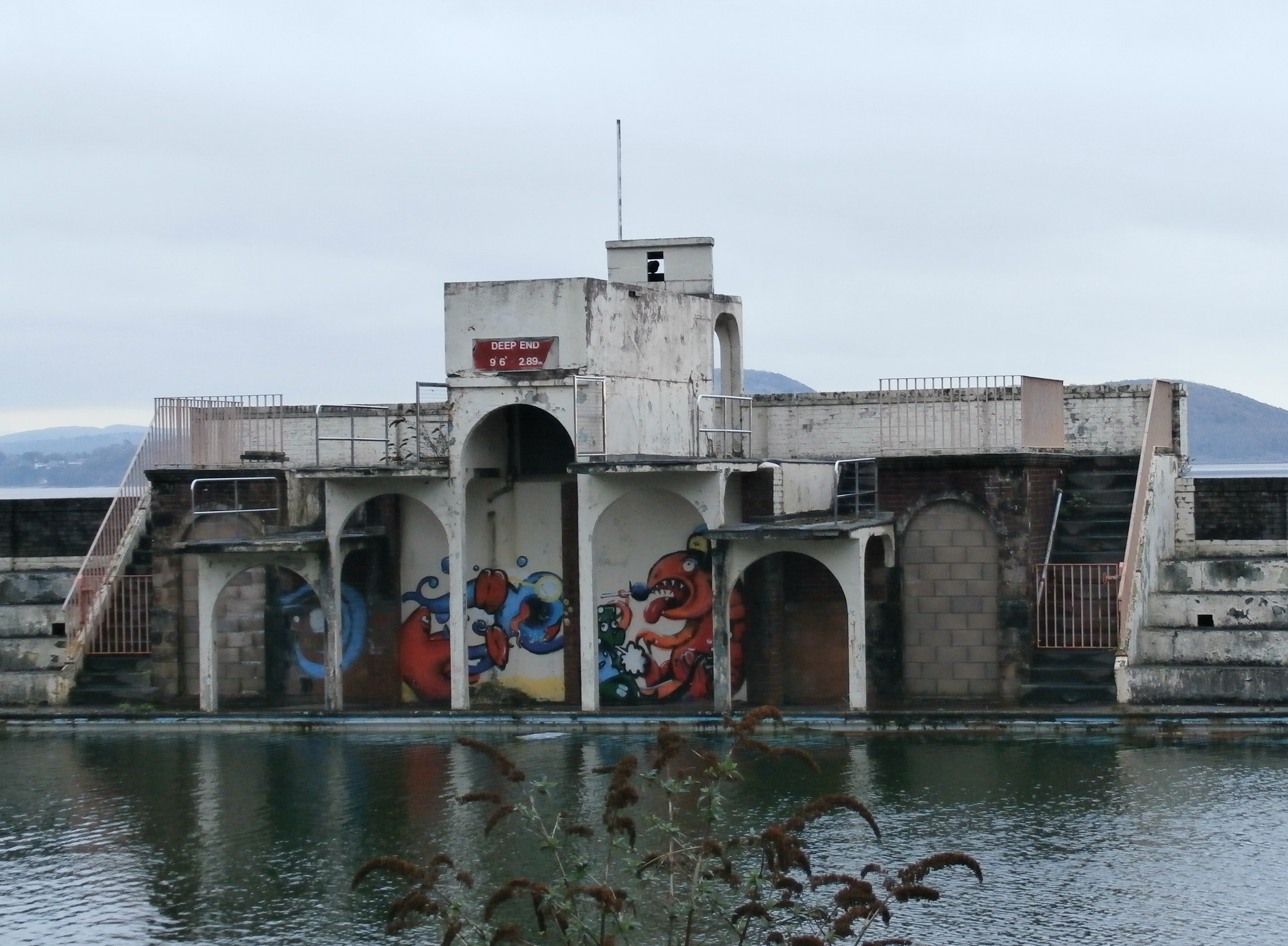
- Grange Lido in 2016

General information
- Architectural style: Art Deco
- Location: Grange-over-Sands, Cumbria, England
- Coordinates: 54.187489°N 2.912146°W
- Opened: 1932
- Renovated: 2023–present
- Closed: 1993

Design and construction
- Architect(s): Bernard Smith or Thomas Huddlestone
- Designations

Listed Building – Grade II
- Official name: Grange Over Sands Lido
- Designated: 26 August 2011
- Reference no.: 1402086

Grange Lido is an open-air 50-metre sea-water swimming pool, or lido, in Grange-over-Sands, Cumbria, England. It opened in 1932 and closed in 1993, but campaigners are working to see it re-opened as a swimming pool. Refurbishment works to create a public space have been ongoing since 2023. The lido is in Art Deco style, and is Grade II listed.

== History and architecture ==
The lido opened in 1932. The buildings were designed by Grange-over-Sands Urban District Council's surveyor, named Bernard Smith or Thomas Huddlestone. The lido sits on Grange promenade on the shore of Morecambe Bay, although as of 2019 the changing course of the River Kent means that the sea is at some distance from the promenade, separated by salt marsh. The 165 ft × 112 ft (50 m × 34 m) pool was filled with filtered sea-water at high tide, and was unheated.

The buildings are in Art Deco style. Historic Pools of Britain describes the lido as "A very fine intact Art Deco mushroom shaped lido in a stunning setting on the edge of Morecambe Bay".

English Heritage state the reasons for the lido's Grade II listing in 2011 as:

- Completeness: as a complete example of a 1930s lido with the survival of all key ancillary buildings and structures
- Pool: for the unusually shaped pool, designed for multiple uses and which retains its original stepped diving stage
- Historic: as an evocative reminder of the former popularity of sea-side towns such as Grange over Sands and the inter-war cult of fresh air, fitness and mass leisure

Pevsner's The Buildings of England (revised ed. 2010), within its description of Grange promenade, simply says "Lido, 1933, closed 1992, and now very forlorn".

The lido suffered damage from floods in 1977, when the outer wall was breached, but celebrated its 50th anniversary in 1982 with a special gala.

== Closure and future ==
The lido closed in 1993, after a report suggested that necessary repairs would be too expensive to be justified.

In 2011 the Save Grange Lido campaign was established, aiming to "transform it into a vibrant community owned leisure facility with a restored 50m pool at its heart." The group has produced a detailed business plan setting out how it believes this could be achieved. It is a community benefit society.

In 2015 South Lakeland District Council began to consider future uses for the site which would not include a swimming facility: the pool area was to become a "landscaped open space". In February 2019, the council allocated £2 million for "light touch refurbishment" of the lido, to include making it structurally sound, bringing it back into public use, and providing refurbished units for community groups or entrepreneurs.

In February 2023, it was reported that the repair work was to start the following month, and later that year the lido's pool was given a "temporary infill" of stones in order to create a public space. In March 2024, works were anticipated to finish by summer, however in May 2025 it was announced that the reopening had been delayed due to issues with concrete repairs.

== See also ==
- Listed buildings in Grange-over-Sands
