= Listed buildings in Grange-over-Sands =

Grange-over-Sands is a civil parish in the Westmorland and Furness district of Cumbria, England. It contains 51 listed buildings that are recorded in the National Heritage List for England. Of these, one is listed at Grade II*, the middle of the three grades, and the others are at Grade II, the lowest grade. The major settlement in the parish is the town of Grange-over-Sands, which developed as a holiday resort after the arrival of the Furness Railway in 1857. Elsewhere the parish contains the villages of Kents Bank and Lindale, and the surrounding countryside. Inside the town the listed buildings include houses, shops, a café, hotels, churches, a railway station, public buildings, a bank, a bandstand, a clock tower, and a disused lido. Outside the town are farmhouses and farm buildings, a country house and associated structures, and a limekiln.

== Buildings ==
=== Key ===
Grade	Criteria
II*	Particularly important buildings of more than special interest
II	Buildings of national importance and special interest

Name and location	Photograph	Date	Notes	Grade
Hardcragg Hall; 54.19378°N 2.91261°W		17th century	The house was restored in about 1900 and since used as a hotel. It is roughcast with a slate roof, and has two storeys. The house has an L-shaped plan, with a south front of five bays and an east front of two bays. The windows are mullioned, some also have a transom, and there are bay windows on both fronts. The porch is gabled and contains a sundial.	II
Monk's Rest; 54.18338°N 2.91846°W	—	17th century	A pebbledashed house with sandstone dressings and a slate roof. There are two storeys and two bays. The central doorway has a moulded surround and an embattled lintel, and above it is a sandstone hood on brackets. The windows are mullioned.	II
Guides Farmhouse and farm buildings 54.18051°N 2.91957°W	—	Mid to late 17th century	The farmhouse and outbuildings are in limestone, the farmhouse is roughcast, and the roofs are slated. They consists of a farmhouse, a higher bank barn to the north, and a single-story range to the east. The farmhouse has two storeys with an attic, five bays, two doorways, and mainly sash windows. In the barn are two shippon doorways, a cart doorway, a small window, and a threshing door. The other range contains two doorways.	II
Brown Robin; 54.19838°N 2.90102°W	—	Late 17th century	A row of three houses in roughcast stone with slate roofs, and two storeys. The central house is the oldest, and the house to the right is taller with two bays. Most of the windows in these houses have windows with rebated and chamfered mullions. The front wall of the house to the left is canted back, it has one bay, and casement windows.	II
Fellgate; 54.19075°N 2.93041°W	—	Late 17th century	A roughcast house with stone dressings, a slate roof, and two storeys. There are three bays and a 20th-century one-bay extension to the left. On the front is a gabled stone porch, and the windows are chamfered and mullioned.	II
Yew Tree Farmhouse and House; 54.18353°N 2.91831°W	—	1740 (probable)	The farmhouse and attached house are pebbledashed with slate roofs. The farmhouse has three storeys and three bays. In the centre is a porch and a doorway with a moulded surround and a dated lintel. The house to the right has two storeys and two bays, and above the left bay is a dormer. Most of the windows are casements.	II
Farm buildings, High Farm; 54.20100°N 2.91538°W	—	Mid-18th century	The earliest farm building is a barn with an entrance on the east front and a shippon at the south. There is a later barn at right angles on the west side with cart entrances and a shippon at a lower level. To the north is a two-storey workshop, and to the south are more shippons.	II
Middle Fell Gate Farmhouse and Underwood; 54.18835°N 2.92844°W	—	Mid-18th century	A pair of roughcast houses with a slate roof and two storeys. The farmhouse, on the left, has three bays, sash windows, and a central doorway with a flat stone hood. Underwood was probably converted from a farm building, and has two bays and casement windows.	II
Farm buildings south of Middle Fell Gate Farmhouse; 54.18811°N 2.92834°W	—	Mid-18th century (probable)	These consist of a barn and an outbuilding at the front, mainly in limestone with slate roofs. Above the main entrance to the barn is a canopy. The outbuilding projects to the front, and in its south face has a doorway with a segmental head. (Note: Street View in September 2016 shows that the buildings have been converted for residential use.)	II
Castle Head; 54.21105°N 2.88848°W		Late 18th century	A country house built for John Wilkinson. later extended and remodelled and used for other purposes. It is rendered and has slate roofs. The original part has three storeys, three fronts of three bays, a continuous verandah, and two parallel hipped roofs. The windows are casements, and on the east front is a three-storey canted bay window.	II
Castle Head Bridge; 54.20962°N 2.88762°W	—	c. 1800	The bridge, with sluice gates, crosses the River Winster. It is in limestone with iron railings on the north parapet, and consists of two segmental arches with cutwaters. The bridge is also a Scheduled Monument.	II
Limekiln; 54.19668°N 2.90853°W		Early 19th century (probable)	The limekiln is built into a hillside and has a roughly square plan. It is constructed in limestone with a brick lining. There is a doorway with a stone lintel, and the chamber has a segmental vault.	II
Barn, Spring Bank Farm; 54.19599°N 2.92366°W	—	Early 19th century (probable)	A bank barn in stone, mainly limestone, with through-stones and a slate roof. It contains a wagon entrance with a segmental arch, doorways and windows.	II
Animal shelter, Castle Head; 54.20893°N 2.88822°W	—	Early to mid-19th century	Originally a garden building, it is in limestone with a corrugated sheet roof. Built into a hillside, it has embattled parapets and in the west wall is a pointed archway. The parapet is capped by a piece of limestone pavement.	II
Coffee Pot Café; 54.19391°N 2.90785°W		Early to mid-19th century	A house, later a café, roughcast with stone dressings and a slate roof. It has three bays and two storeys, with an attic in the middle bay, which is gabled with plain bargeboards and a finial. The doorway in the central bay has engaged columns with palm-leaf capitals, a frieze with roundels, and a pediment containing a laurel wreath, on the upper floor is a sash window, and in the attic is a round-headed window with a keystone. On the ground floor of the left bay is a shop window, and the other windows are sashes.	II
Kent's Bank House; 54.17335°N 2.92574°W	—	Early to mid-19th century	A house that was extended later, and subsequently used for other purposes, it is roughcast with a slate roof. The earlier part, facing south, has two storeys and attics, and two bays. It has a central round-headed doorway with a fanlight, on the ground floor are canted bay windows with casement, and above the windows are sashes, those in the attic partly in gabled dormers. To the right is a gabled wing containing a wide canted bay window. The extensions face east and have two storeys, gables, casement windows, and French windows.	II
Mews Cottage; 54.17344°N 2.92603°W	—	Early to mid-19th century	A roughcast house with an artificial slate roof, two storeys and two bays. In the centre is a lean-to porch, and the windows are sashes with stone surrounds and projecting sills.	II
Rose Cottage; 54.19648°N 2.90489°W		Early to mid-19th century	A roughcast house with a sill band, a slate roof, two storeys and three bays. In the centre is a timber gabled trellis porch with shaped bargeboards. The round-headed doorway has a stone surround, impost blocks, and a fanlight, and the windows are sashes.	II
Abbot Hall; 54.17220°N 2.92791°W		1840s	A large house that was extended in about 1870, and later a hotel. It is roughcast with some limestone dressings, and has a slate roof. The original part has two storeys with an attic and a T-shaped plan. It has a symmetrical front of three bays, the central bay projecting and gabled with shaped bargeboards. The additions include a taller gabled wing with a two-storey canted bay window and pierced and shaped bargeboards, and a tower with three storeys and an attic and a pyramidal roof. A later addition is a 20th-century lean-to glass porch.	II
Garden Temple, Holme Island; 54.19499°N 2.88730°W	—	1840s	The garden temple is in limestone, and has a circular plan. It is surrounded by a moat, and stands on three limestone steps. Around the temple are 16 Corinthian cast iron columns supporting an entablature decorated with swags and goats' heads. Above this is a drum with four windows and a lead-covered dome. On the north side are curved double doors with an architrave and a cornice on brackets, and around the temple are three round headed niches. Crossing the moat is a cast iron bridge with limestone abutments and iron balustrades.	II
Bay Hall; 54.19396°N 2.90780°W		1849	A house that was extended to the left in 1860, it is roughcast with limestone dressings and a slate roof. There are two storeys, a basement and an attic, and two gabled bays face the road. In the right gable end is a round-headed stair window with a keystone, and it contains glass that is etched and coloured. To the left is a small window, to the right is a doorway, and in the gable is an initialled and dated roundel. In the left gable is a dated plaque, and below are two sash windows.	II
Fern Cottage; 54.19642°N 2.90498°W		Mid-19th century	A roughcast house with a slate roof, two storeys and two bays. In the centre is a timber gabled trellis porch with shaped bargeboards. The doorway has a rendered surround, and the windows are casements.	II
Hawthorne Cottage; 54.18236°N 2.91909°W	—	Mid-19th century	A roughcast house with a slate roof, two storeys and two bays. In the centre is a timber gabled latticework open porch. The windows have sandstone sills, on the ground floor they are casements, and on the upper floor they are sashes.	II
Seaside Cottage, Morningside Cottage and Rose Cottage; 54.18139°N 2.91913°W	—	Mid-19th century	A row of three limestone, partly roughcast, houses with a slate roof. There are two storeys, a double-depth plan, and the front at each end is gabled with four bays. The windows in the north front are 20th-century casements, and in the south front most are sashes. On the west wall is a cast iron dated nameplate.	II
Slack House; 54.20408°N 2.90572°W	—	Mid-19th century (probable)	A house that was extended later in the 19th century, it is pebbledashed with limestone dressings and a slate roof. There are two storeys, and the original part has three bays. This has a gabled porch with decorative bargeboards and double doors. The single-bay addition to the right has gables, also with decorative bargeboards. Most of the windows in both parts are sashes, and in the right return is a canted bay window.	II
The Cottage; 54.18135°N 2.91962°W	—	Mid-19th century	A house, mainly in limestone, with a slate roof hipped on the right, and two storeys. On each front are three bays, and the windows are sashes. On the south front are two blind recesses, and on the east front is a doorway.	II
Two follies 54.19795°N 2.89836°W	—	Mid-19th century (probable)	The buildings are in the grounds of Netherwood Hotel, they were originally outbuildings and have been converted into houses. They are in limestone with embattled parapets and slate roofs, and are joined by an embattled wall. The west building has a corbelled round corner turret, the east building has a corbelled embattled parapet, and both buildings have windows with triangular heads.	II
St Paul's Church; 54.19330°N 2.90979°W		1852–53	Aisles were added under separate pitched roofs in 1861 and in 1867, the chancel was lengthened in 1875, the porch was added in 1904, and in 1932–33 the east end was rebuilt and altered by Henry Paley. The church is built in limestone with sandstone dressings and a slate roof. It consists of a nave with a west porch, north and south aisles, and a chancel with a polygonal apse. At the west end, between the nave and the south aisle, is a bell turret with a spirelet.	II
Merlewood; 54.20888°N 2.90664°W		1853	A country house that was extended in 1881, and has since been divided into apartments. It is in limestone with slate roofs, and has an irregular plan. There are two high storeys with attics, and its features include steep gables with ornamental bargeboards, two-storey bay windows, an oriel window, and an oblong tower with a pyramidal roof and a weathervane.	II
Merlewood Lodge; 54.20654°N 2.90422°W		1853	The lodge at the entrance to the drive to Merlewood is roughcast with limestone dressings and a slate roof. There are two storeys, and the front facing the drive has two bays, the right bay projecting and gabled. The left bay has a timber gabled porch, a mullioned window, and a gabled dormer with ornamental bargeboards. In the left return is a canted bay window and a gable with similar bargeboards.	II
Former stable block, Castle Head; 54.21050°N 2.89098°W	—	1864	The stable block surrounds a courtyard, and is built with limestone outer walls and brick inner walls. The roofs have asbestos sheet replacing slate. On the west side is an elliptical entrance arch, above which is an embattled wall with a dated plaque. At the entrance are iron gates and a cast iron weighbridge, and in the west range are two round archways. From the south of the block an embattled wall runs along the driveway.	II
Abbot Hall Lodge; 54.17346°N 2.92654°W	—	Mid to late 19th century	The lodge is roughcast with a hipped slate roof and a single storey. On the front is a gabled porch with a segmental head. There is one window to the left and two to the right; they are mullioned with two lights, and contain sashes with Gothic tracery.	II
South Lodge, Castle Head; 54.20618°N 2.89516°W	—	Mid to late 19th century	The lodge, at the entrance to the drive, is in limestone with a slate roof, and has one storey with a basement at the rear. Facing the road is a gable end containing a casement window. To the left and in the left return are three more casement window in hipped dormers. To the right is a tower with a verandah below. The verandah is carried on six cast iron barley-sugar columns on sandstone bases and with timber brackets pierced with quatrefoils. The tower is square with quatrefoils and a pyramidal roof.	II
Gate piers, South Lodge, Castle Head; 54.20606°N 2.89506°W	—	Mid to late 19th century	The gate piers at the entrance to the drive are in limestone. They are octagonal with chamfered rustication, and have moulded pyramidal caps.	II
Holme Island Lodge; 54.19725°N 2.88703°W	—	Mid to late 19th century	The lodge is at the entrance to the island. It is in limestone with red sandstone dressings, a string course, an embattled parapet, and a hipped slate roof. The lodge is in a single storey, and has a turret containing a porch at the northwest corner. The windows have rebated and chamfered surrounds, there is a canted bay window, and a cross window.	II
Field gate, Merlewood; 54.20946°N 2.90496°W	—	Mid to late 19th century	The gateway is between the gardens and the farm, and is in a mixture of cast and wrought iron. The piers are square with openwork panels and concave pyramidal tops. The gates have horizontal rails, square panels, and scrollwork.	II
Grange Hotel; 54.19759°N 2.90254°W		1866	This was built as a railway hotel, and was designed by E. G. Paley. It is in limestone with sandstone dressings and slate roofs. The hotel mainly has two storeys, with a four-storey entrance bay, and a three-storey cross wing to the right. The entrance front has nine bays, the entrance bay has a semi-pavilion roof with railings, and the other bays have mansard roofs with dormers. The ground floor windows are casements with segmental heads, and on the upper floor they are sashes. Above the doorway is an entablature with a moulded cornice on Tuscan pilasters.	II
Former stable block, Grange Hotel; 54.19636°N 2.90218°W		1866	The stable block is built around a courtyard, and is in limestone with sandstone dressings and a slate roof. It was probably designed by E. G. Paley. The south front is in one storey and has a central two-storey gateway with a segmental arch and a half-hipped roof. The flanking bays contain doorways, windows, and a gabled dormer. In the west range is a timber slated verandah.	II
Railway station 54.19578°N 2.90290°W		1872	The station was designed by E. G. Paley for the Furness Railway. It is in limestone with sandstone dressings and a Westmorland slate roof. The main range on the north platform has seven bays, mainly in a single storey, with the outer bays in two storeys with half-hipped roofs. On the platform front is a canted bay window and a five-bay canopy. There is a similar canopy on the south platform range. Most of the windows are double sashes.	II
Methodist Church; 54.19255°N 2.91200°W		1874	The church is in limestone with sandstone dressings and slate roofs with coped gables, one of which has a cross finial. The church is in Gothic Revival style, and consists of a nave with a narthex, a chancel-like projection and a vestry. Over the main entrance is a large window with Geometrical tracery. There are school rooms extending to the south.	II
1–8 Yewbarrow Terrace; 54.19613°N 2.90517°W		Late 19th century	A row of seven shops with living accommodation above, in limestone with sandstone dressings, some applied half-timbering, and a slate roof. They have two storeys with attics, and each shop has three bays. On the ground floor are timber shop fronts and a glazed verandah carried on cast iron columns. On the upper floor are sash windows. The outer and central shops have canted oriel windows, and all shops have dormers that have gables with finials.	II
Row of shops east of The Grange Institute; 54.19384°N 2.90856°W		Late 19th century	A row of seven shops with living accommodation above. They are in limestone with roofs mainly of slate with some tiles. Each shop has two storeys with an attic, and each has two bays. On the ground floor are shop fronts, two of which may be original, on the upper floor are sash windows with projecting sills, and in the attic each shop has a gabled dormer containing a window with a segmental head. The shop on the right corner has a canted corner bay.	II
Netherwood Hotel; 54.19801°N 2.89921°W		1893	Originally a country house, later a hotel, it is in limestone with red sandstone dressings and slate roofs. It has an irregular plan with two and three storeys and a basement. A flight of steps with parapets and pyramid finials leads up to the gabled entrance porch. The doorway has a moulded surround and a Tudor arched head, and above it is a datestone. To the right is a three-storey embattled tower, and to the left are bays with coped gables and finials; the left bay has a square bay window. The windows are mullioned and most also have transoms. There are later extensions.	II*
Entrance piers, Netherwood Hotel; 54.19667°N 2.89994°W	—	1893 (probable)	The piers at the entrance to the drive are in sandstone. They are rusticated, and each has a moulded base, a fluted frieze, and a moulded cornice. They are surmounted by 20th-century lamps.	II
Blawith Lodge; 54.19913°N 2.90300°W	—	1895	The lodge, later a private house, is in limestone with slate roofs. It has a complex plan, and is mainly in one storey with attics, and has a two-storey gabled wing to the left. There is a single-storey porch with an embattled parapet and a slated timber verandah. The windows are casements, and the bargeboards are plain.	II
Council Offices and Victoria Hall; 54.19422°N 2.90814°W		1898	The council offices and public hall are in limestone with sandstone dressings and a slate roof. The building has two storeys, six bays, and shaped gables with ball finials, one with spikes. There are two similar doorways, approached by steps, with round heads, pilasters, and open pediments, and the windows are mullioned and transomed.	II
Bandstand; 54.18957°N 2.91239°W		1895	The bandstand is in Park Road Gardens. It is in cast iron, and has a zinc pagoda-style roof. The bandstand is surrounded by a moat with a bridge on the west side, and has an octagonal plan. The columns are set in limestone kerb stones, and have brackets forming elliptical arches with foliage decoration in the spandrels. At each corner, and on the apex of the roof, are ornamental finials.	II
Barclays Bank; 54.19352°N 2.90865°W		1910	Built for the Bank of Liverpool, it is in sandstone on a plinth, with a string course, a moulded cornice, and a stone-slate roof. There is one storey, and a basement at the rear. The right bay has a coped gable, and contains a doorway with a moulded Tudor arched head. The windows are mullioned.	II
Clock tower 54.19298°N 2.90971°W		1912	The clock tower is in limestone with sandstone dressings and a slate roof. It has diagonal buttresses on the corners that rise above the eaves. On each side is a string course, above which is a glazed slit, a clock face, and a three-light mullioned opening. The tower has a doorway with a moulded surround, over which is an inscribed plaque.	II
War memorial 54.18315°N 2.92310°W	—	c. 1919	The war memorial is in the grounds of Cartmel Grange. It is in concrete and consists of a statue of a soldier holding a rifle. This stands on a round base on a moulded rectangular base. On the rectangular base is an inscribed marble plaque.	II
Lido; 54.18721°N 2.91199°W		1932	The lido, consisting of a sea-water swimming pool and associated buildings, closed in about 1993, but the pool and many of the buildings have survived. The pool is in concrete, the ancillary buildings are in brick with concrete dressings, and have slated roofs. The pool is in the shape of the cross-section of a mushroom, and there is a children's paddling pool. The ancillary buildings consist of a pump house with a five-stage diving stage, a two-storey five-bay entrance building with a viewing gallery, and changing rooms.	II

== Notes and references ==
=== Sources ===
- Historic England, "Hardcragg Hall, Grange-over-Sands (1269709)", National Heritage List for England
- Historic England, "Monk's Rest, Grange-over-Sands (1269701)", National Heritage List for England
- Historic England, "Guides Farmhouse and attached farm buildings, Grange-over-Sands (1269699)", National Heritage List for England
- Historic England, "Brown Robin (three adjoining cottages of the same name), Grange-over-Sands (1269675)", National Heritage List for England
- Historic England, "Fellgate, Grange-over-Sands (1269705)", National Heritage List for England
- Historic England, "Yew Tree Farmhouse and Yew Tree House, Grange-over-Sands (1269704)", National Heritage List for England
- Historic England, "Farm buildings to south-east of High Farmhouse, Grange-over-Sands (1269710)", National Heritage List for England
- Historic England, "Middle Fell Gate Farmhouse and Underwood, Grange-over-Sands (1269706)", National Heritage List for England
- Historic England, "Farm buildings adjoining to south of Middle Fell Gate Farmhouse. Grange-over-Sands (1269707)", National Heritage List for England
- Historic England, "Castle Head, Grange-over-Sands (1269676)", National Heritage List for England
- Historic England, "Castle Head Bridge, Grange-over-Sands (1269679)", National Heritage List for England
- Historic England, "Castlehead Bridge, Grange-over-Sands (1007108)", National Heritage List for England
- Historic England, "Kiln at SD 4082 7826 to the east of Hillside Cottage and to the south of Sandyfield, Grange-over-Sands (1269669)", National Heritage List for England
- Historic England, "Outbarn to the south east of Spring Bank Farmhouse, Grange-over-Sands (1269656)", National Heritage List for England
- Historic England, "Animal shelter to north of boathouse at Castle Head, Grange-over-Sands (1269678)", National Heritage List for England
- Historic England, "Coffee Pot Cafe, Grange-over-Sands (1269688)", National Heritage List for England
- Historic England, "Kent's Bank House, Grange-over-Sands (1269673)", National Heritage List for England
- Historic England, "Mews Cottage, Grange-over-Sands (1269674)", National Heritage List for England
- Historic England, "Rose Cottage, Grange-over-Sands (1269651)", National Heritage List for England
- Historic England, "Abbot Hall, Grange-over-Sands (1269671)", National Heritage List for England
- Historic England, "Garden Temple at Holme Island House, to south of house, including attached bridge, Grange-over-Sands (1269653)", National Heritage List for England
- Historic England, "Bay Hall, Grange-over-Sands (1269686)", National Heritage List for England
- Historic England, "Fern Cottage, Grange-over-Sands (1269650)", National Heritage List for England
- Historic England, "Hawthorn Cottage, Grange-over-Sands (1269700)", National Heritage List for England
- Historic England, "Seaside Cottage, Morningside Cottage including street nameplate, and Rose Cottage, Grange-over-Sands (1269702)", National Heritage List for England
- Historic England, "Slack House, Grange-over-Sands (1269664)", National Heritage List for England
- Historic England, "The Cottage, Grange-over-Sands (1269703)", National Heritage List for England
- Historic England, "Two follies in wooded cliff, above and belonging to Netherwood Hotel, Grange-over-Sands (1269683)", National Heritage List for England
- Historic England, "Church of St Paul, Grange-over-Sands (1269708)", National Heritage List for England
- Historic England, "Merlewood, Grange-over-Sands (1269661)", National Heritage List for England
- Historic England, "Former stable block at Castle Head, Grange-over-Sands (1269677)", National Heritage List for England
- Historic England, "Merlewood Lodge, Grange-over-Sands (1269663)", National Heritage List for England
- Historic England, "Abbot Hall Lodge, Grange-over-Sands (1269672)", National Heritage List for England
- Historic England, "South Lodge to Castle Head, Grange-over-Sands (1269680)", National Heritage List for England
- Historic England, "Gate piers to south of South Lodge to Castle Head, Grange-over-Sands (1269681)", National Heritage List for England
- Historic England, "Holme Island Lodge, Grange-over-Sands (1269654)", National Heritage List for England
- Historic England, "Field gate between Merlewood gardens and farm, Grange-over-Sands (1269662)", National Heritage List for England
- Historic England, "Grange Hotel, Grange-over-Sands (1269657)", National Heritage List for England
- Historic England, "Former stable block to Grange Hotel, Grange-over-Sands (1269658)", National Heritage List for England
- Historic England, "Grange-Over-Sands Railway Station, Grange-over-Sands (1269659)", National Heritage List for England
- Historic England, "Methodist church, Grange-over-Sands (1269670)", National Heritage List for England
- Historic England, "Nos. 1 to 8 Yewbarrow Terrace, Grange-over-Sands (1269665)", National Heritage List for England
- Historic England, "Row of shop premises to right of The Grange Institute, Grange-over-Sands (1269652)", National Heritage List for England
- Historic England, "Netherwood Hotel, Grange-over-Sands (1269682)", National Heritage List for England
- Historic England, "Two entrance piers to Netherwood Hotel, Grange-over-Sands (1269684)", National Heritage List for England
- Historic England, "Blawith Lodge, Grange-over-Sands (1269660)", National Heritage List for England
- Historic England, "Council Offices, and Victoria Hall, including attached offices and restaurant, Grange-over-Sands (1269689)", National Heritage List for England
- Historic England, "Bandstand in Park Road Gardens, Grange-over-Sands (1269655)", National Heritage List for England
- Historic England, "Barclay's Bank, Grange-over-Sands (1269685)", National Heritage List for England
- Historic England, "Clock Tower, Grange-over-Sands (1269687)", National Heritage List for England
- Historic England, "World War I Memorial at Cartmel Grange, Grange-over-Sands (1393102)", National Heritage List for England
- Historic England, "Grange Over Sands Lido, Grange-over-Sands (1402086)", National Heritage List for England
- Historic England, Listed Buildings
- Hyde, Matthew; Pevsner, Nikolaus (2010) [1967], Cumbria, The Buildings of England, New Haven and London: Yale University Press, ISBN 978-0-300-12663-1
