= Wilfred Lancaster =

English footballer

Personal information
- Full name: Wilfred Lancaster
- Date of birth: 27 September 1904
- Place of birth: Backbarrow, England
- Date of death: July 1987 (aged 82)
- Place of death: England
- Position: Outside forward

Senior career*
Years	Team	Apps	(Gls)
19xx–1924	Dick, Kerr's	?	(?)
1924–1925	Burnley	4	(0)
- * Club domestic league appearances and goals

Wilfred Lancaster (27 September 1904 – July 1987) was an English professional footballer who played as an outside forward. Born in Backbarrow, Lancashire, he was playing for the Dick, Kerr's company team when he was signed by Football League First Division side Burnley in December 1924.

Lancaster made his League debut on 26 December 1924 in the 0–2 defeat away at Huddersfield Town, and played again the following match against Everton. He then spent two months out of the team, returning for the 5–4 win over West Ham United on 28 February 1925. Lancaster made his final appearance for Burnley in the penultimate fixture of the 1924–25 campaign, a 1–1 draw with Aston Villa at Turf Moor. He was released by Burnley in April 1925, and his whereabouts thereafter are unknown.
