= Ashley (automobile) =

British manufacturers of car body shells & chassis for specials (1955-1962)

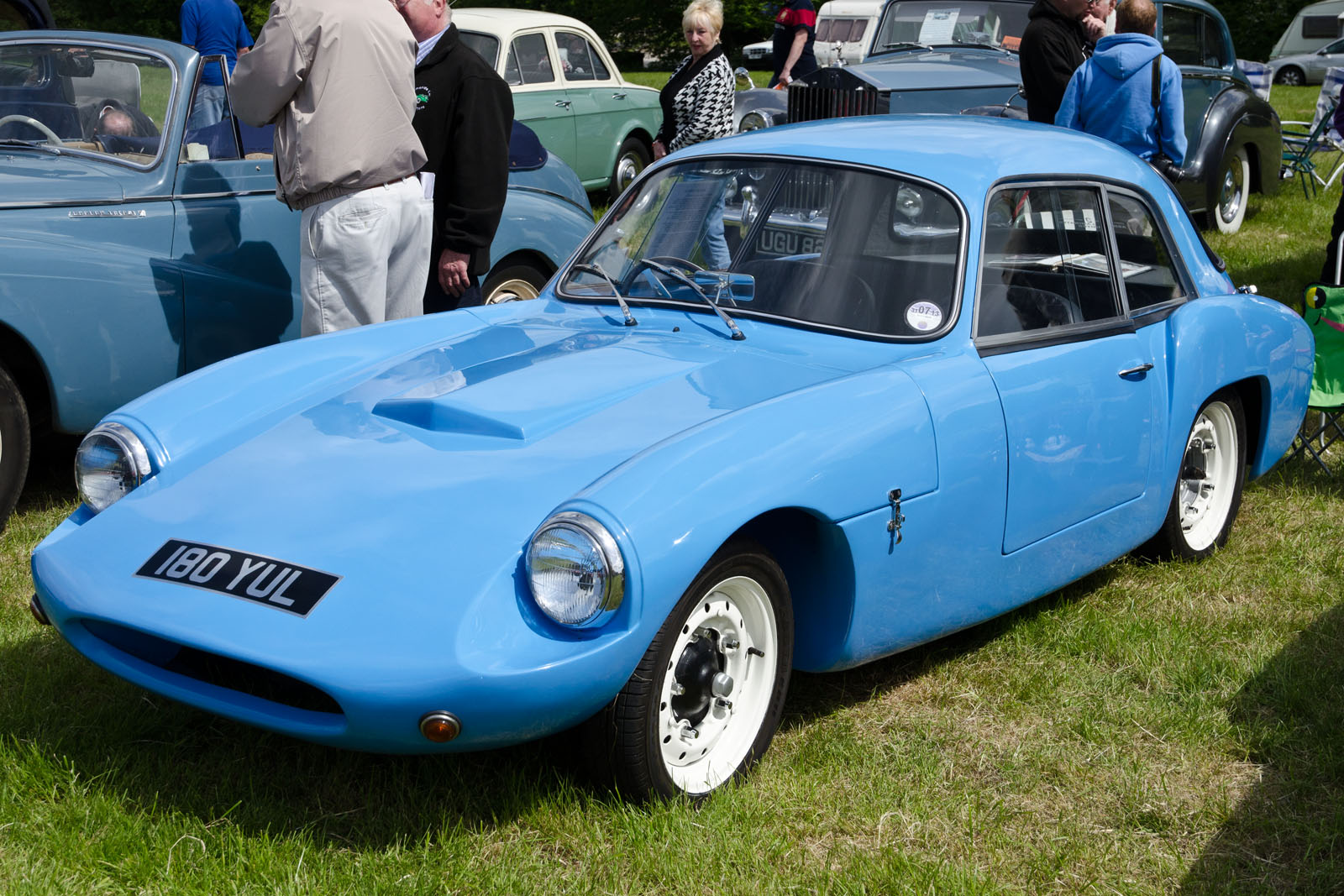
A 1960 Ashley 1172

Ashley were manufacturers of body shells and chassis for specials from 1955 to 1962. They also offered a range of products for special builds: radiators, header tanks, lighting sets, steel tubing, sheet aluminium, various suspension parts, water pumps, tires, tubes and wheels. The company also made bonnets and hardtops for other mass-produced sports cars, including the Austin-Healey Sprite and Jaguar E-Type.

== History ==
Ashley Laminates was founded in 1955 by Peter Pellandine and Keith Waddington. The name "Ashley" was chosen as it was the name of Peter Pellandine's house in Woodford Green. They designed and built their first car using GRP for the bodyshell. The two set up a small factory in a garage next to the Robin Hood Inn at Loughton, Essex to produce shells. The garage has now made way for a pub car park.

In late 1956 Pellandine left the company to found Falcon Shells, another specials company. Pellandine took with him the rights and tooling to manufacture the short-wheelbase bodyshell for the Ashley 750 and the Sports Racer which he continued in production as the Falcon Mark 1 and Mark 2 respectively.

In 1958, to increase manufacturing space, Ashley Laminates moved to the Potteries in Upshire, whilst retaining the Loughton premises as a showroom. He also introduced a new bodyshell, the 1172, and the Regent chassis. 1960 saw the introduction of the Sportiva.

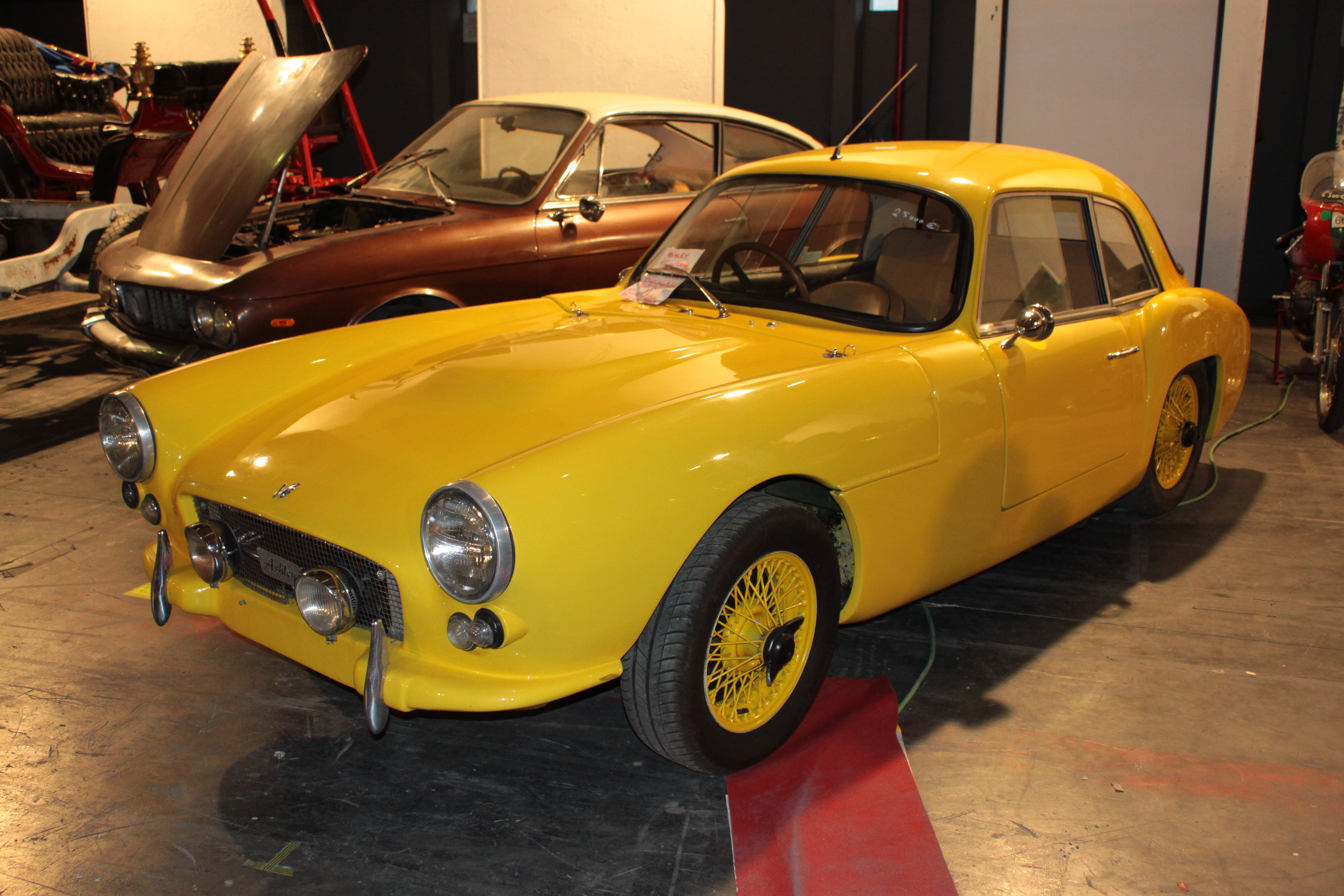
Ashley Sportiva at Auto Retro 2010 in Barcelona. For further info on this car see the AshleyPhoenix Story

In 1961 the company moved again, this time to Bush Fair, Harlow, but the following year production of body shells ceased when the specials market waned, due to a change in Sales Tax rules. The company, however, continued to manufacture GRP hardtops and bonnets for sports cars.

Adverts from 1963 onwards indicate that the company changed names to Ashley Auto Improvements and moved, this time to Bishops Stortford in Hertfordshire.

Although Keith Waddington died in the mid-1960s, the company continued until 1972.

The Ashley range of bodyparts has been re introduced in 2010 by Moto-Build Racing in Sutton in Surrey and whilst at present it focuses mainly on the MG Midget and Austin Healey Sprite there are moulds in progress for the Triumph Spitfire Mk1, 2 and 3, there is a website dedicated to this at www.ashleygt.co.uk

== Models ==
=== Ashley 750 ===
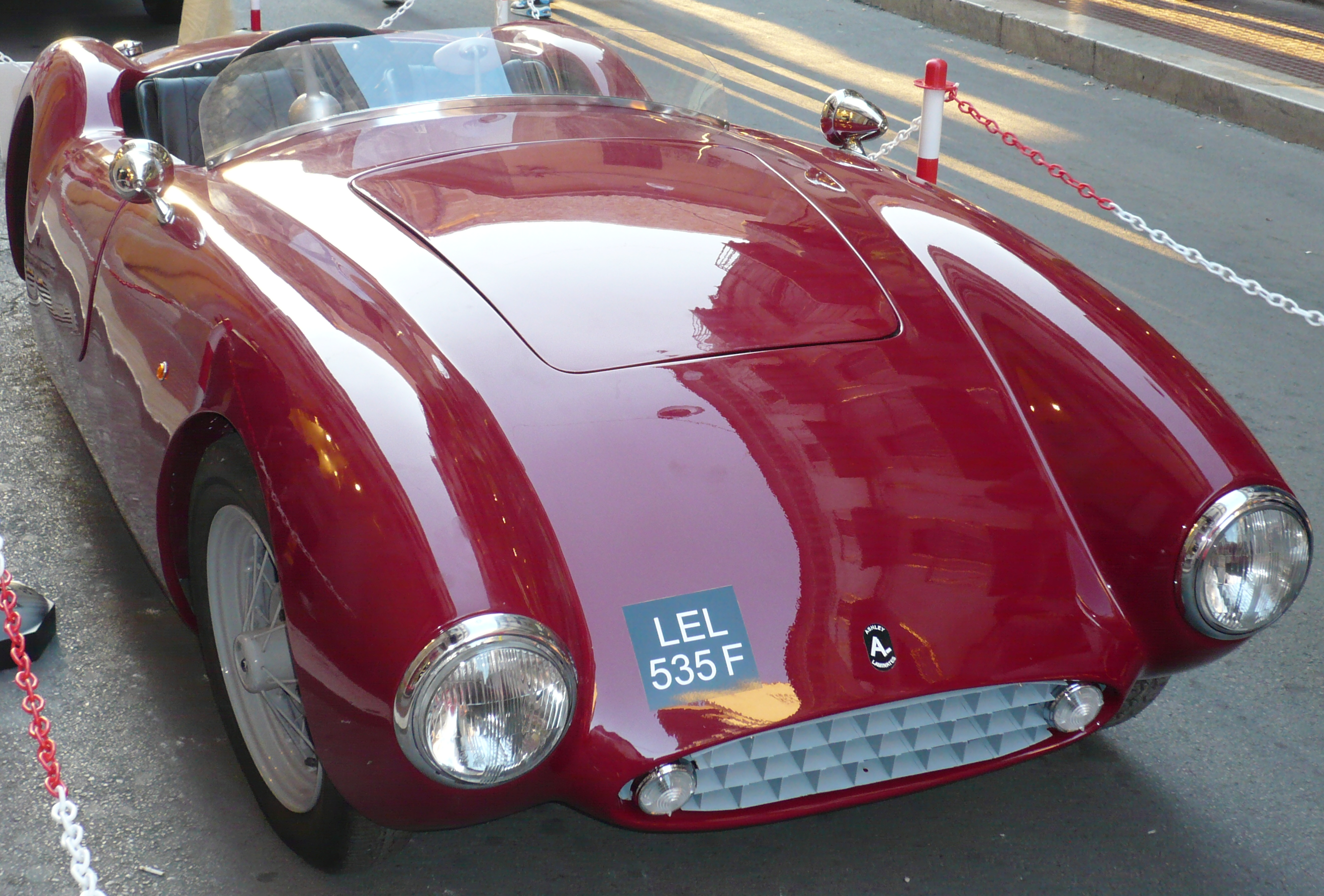
Ashley 750

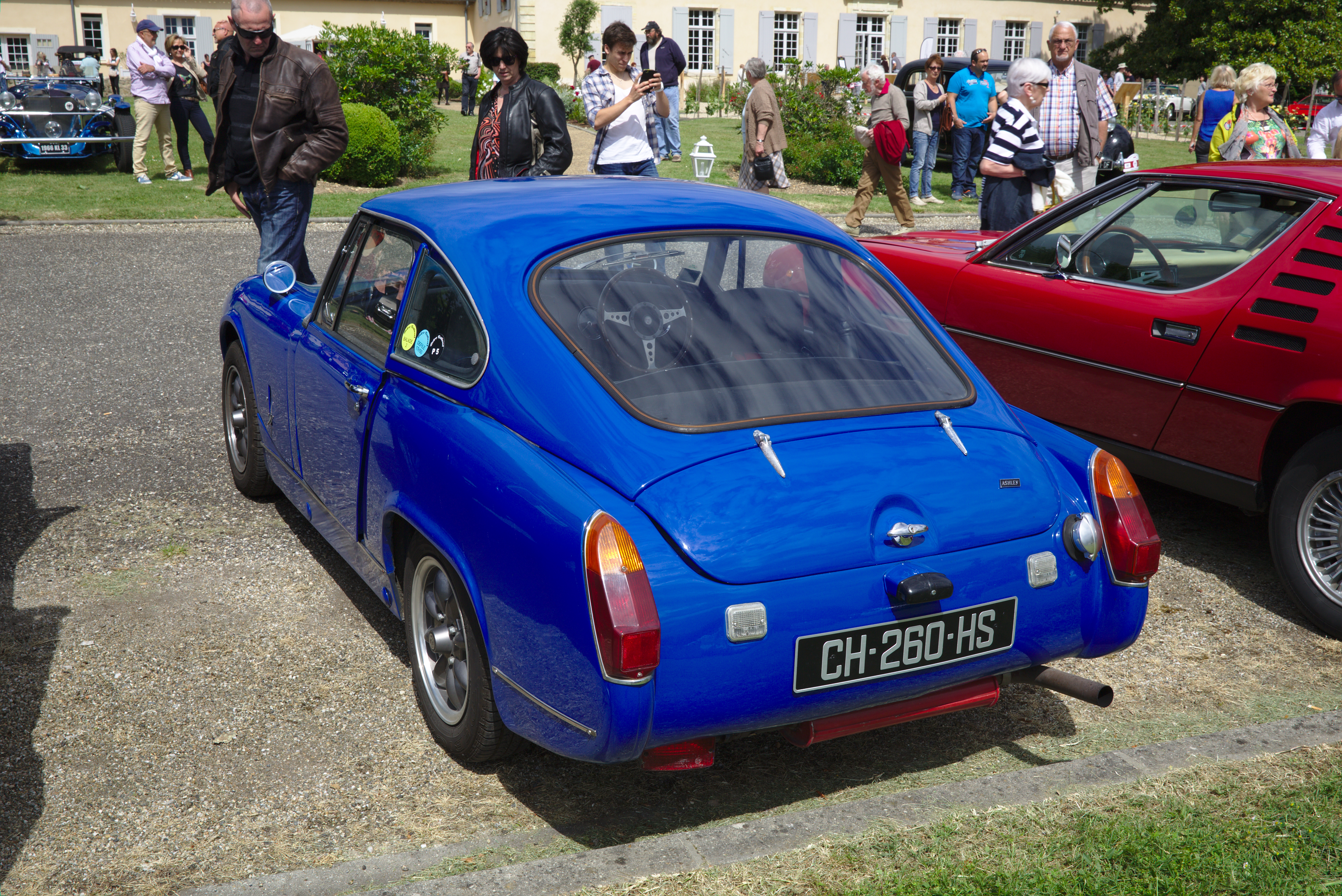
Hard top Ashley

Based on the short-wheelbase (6-foot 3 inch) Austin Seven chassis, with its 747 cc engine (hence the model name). Later a long-wheelbase (6-foot 9 inch) version was offered. The price of both was the same: £78 for the shell and £25 for the hard top. The early hardtops had gull wing doors but it is believed that none have survived. When Pellandine left, he took the rights to build the short-wheelbase version, while Ashley just manufactured the long version.

=== Ashley Sports Racer ===
Introduced shortly after the 750 for £90, it was made to accommodate wheelbases from 6-foot-11-inch (2.11 m) to 7-foot-3-inch (2.21 m) As the name suggests the shell was primarily designed for track rather than everyday road use and could be mated to an Elva chassis. A number of contemporary racing cars used it.

=== Ashley 1172 ===
Launched in August 1958, it was initially a roadster with a detachable hard top, to fit the Ford 8 and 10hp chassis of 7-foot-6-inch (2.29 m) wheelbase with the Ford Sidevalve engine. It had a displacement of 1172 cc from which the model took its name. The Regent chassis was advertised as an alternative underpinning for the shell. Early in 1959 a fixed head coupe was offered whilst from January 1960 the 1172 was also available to fit the 7-foot-10-inch (2.39 m) Prefect ladder frame. The roadster shells retailed for £105 and the coupes for £160. The rights to the 1172 body were acquired by Yitzhak Shubinsky of the Israeli Autocars Co. and modified, becoming both the Autocar Sabra and in a manufacturing agreement with Reliant, the Reliant Sabre.

=== Ashley Sportiva ===
Debuting in November 1960, it was initially an 1172 with revised front styling. It was made available as a bodyshell or with an Ashley chassis. It could be had as a drophead or a fixed head coupe with two or four seats. Later Sportiva's had a revised rear with boot lid and a longer wheelbase of eight feet to accommodate the new Mark 6 chassis. The fixed head coupe bodyshell retailed for £182.

=== Ashley Sportiva Morgan +4 Coupe ===
Debuting at the 1962 Geneva Motor Show this Morgan +4 fitted with an Ashley Sportiva body-shell never went into production.

== See also ==
- List of car manufacturers of the United Kingdom
