= Listed buildings in Haverthwaite =

Haverthwaite is a civil parish in the Westmorland and Furness district of Cumbria, England. It contains ten listed buildings that are recorded in the National Heritage List for England. Of these, one is listed at Grade II*, the middle of the three grades, and the others are at Grade II, the lowest grade. The parish is in the Lake District National Park. It contains the villages of Haverthwaite and Backbarrow, and is otherwise mainly rural. A surviving building from its industrial past is a former saltpetre refinery for a gunpowder factory. The other listed buildings include houses and associated structures, farm buildings, bridges, a war memorial, and a church.

== Key ==
| Grade | Criteria |
|---|---|
| II* | Particularly important buildings of more than special interest |
| II | Buildings of national importance and special interest |

== Buildings ==
| Name and location | Photograph | Date | Notes | Grade |
|---|---|---|---|---|
| Bigland Hall; 54.23991°N 2.99154°W | | 16th century | A country house in stone with quoins, a sill band, a top cornice, a coped parapet, and a hipped slate roof. There are two storeys and a southeast front of five bays, the centre bay projecting forward. At the entrance is a Doric porch with paired columns, and a doorway with a fanlight. The windows are sashes, the window in the central bay having an architrave, a consoled frieze and a cornice. On the left return is a conservatory and a stair window. On the right return are two parallel wings. | II |
| Hard Crag, barn and outbuilding 54.24422°N 2.98363°W | — | 17th century | The house, barn and outbuilding are in stone, the house is roughcast, and the buildings have slate roofs. The house has two storeys and two bays, the barn has three bays, and projects to the left, and the outbuilding is recessed to the right. The windows vary, and include a stair window at the rear, and the barn has a large entrance. | II |
| Backbarrow Bridge; 54.25606°N 2.99026°W | | 17th or 18th century | The bridge carries a road over the River Leven. It is in stone with limestone coping, and consists of a single segmental arch, slightly pointed on the south side. The bridge has a straight parapet, and there is a plaque on the north side. | II |
| Haverthwaite House and Cottage; 54.24686°N 3.01319°W | — | 1734 | Originally one house, later divided into two, it is roughcast with slate roofs. There are two storeys, the house has five bays, and the cottage, lower and to the right, has two bays. The windows in the house are sashes, and those in the cottage are casements. | II |
| Gate piers, Haverthwaite House; 54.24681°N 3.01305°W | — | c. 1734 | The gate piers are in ashlar stone and have a square plan. Each pier has flat pilasters and an entablature, a pulvinated frieze, and a ball finial. | II |
| Bare Syke House; 54.25179°N 2.99264°W | — | 1740s | A house built for Isaac Wilkinson, it is in roughcast stone with a slate roof. There are two storeys and three bays, a lean-to extension on the front, an outbuilding at the rear, and an outhouse on the left side. The windows on the front are sashes in architraves, and above the doorway is a flat slate canopy. At the rear most of the windows are casements. | II |
| Low Wood Bridge; 54.24430°N 3.00621°W | | 18th or early 19th century | The bridge carries the B5278 road over the River Leven. It is in stone, and consists of three elliptical arches with round cutwaters on each side. The bridge has a plain coping. | II |
| St Anne's Church; 54.24870°N 3.00382°W | | 1824–25 | The church is in stone, partly roughcast, with a slate roof. It consists of a nave and chancel in a single cell, vestries, and a west tower. The tower has a west porch and a projecting embattled parapet. The windows in the church have pointed heads and contain Y-tracery. | II |
| Clock Tower Works; 54.24458°N 3.00416°W | | 1849 | A former saltpetre refinery associated with a gunpowder factory, later used for other purposes, it is in slate rubble with slate roofs. The building has a U-shaped plan and incorporates a clock tower. The tower has three stages, it contains sash windows, and has a pyramidal roof with a wrought iron finial and a weathervane. On the northwest front is a round clock face. | II* |
| War memorial 54.24817°N 3.00194°W | | 1920 | The war memorial stands by the entrance to the cemetery. It is in limestone, and consists of a plain Latin cross on a plinth on a three-stepped base. On the plinth is an inscription and the names of those lost in the two World Wars. | II |
