= Lakeland Motor Museum =

Coordinates: 54°15′32″N 2°59′21″W

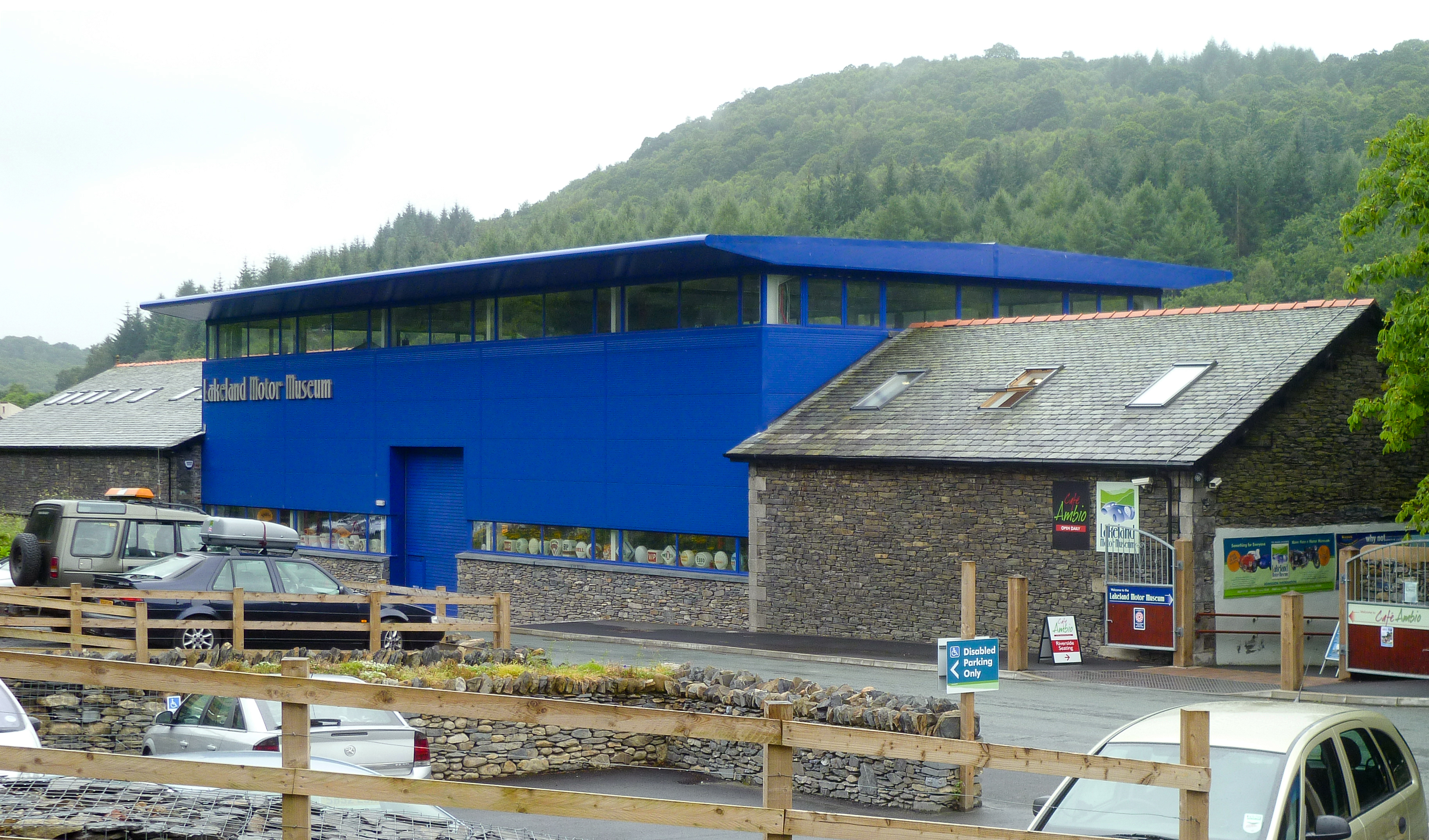
- Established: 1978; 48 years ago
- Location: Backbarrow, Cumbria, England
- Type: Transport Museum
- Parking: On-site (free)
- Website: www.lakelandmotormuseum.co.uk

The Lakeland Motor Museum is a museum now located at Backbarrow, Cumbria, England which houses a collection of classic cars, motorcycles, bicycles, pedal cars and motoring related items and memorabilia and an exhibition dedicated to the land and water speed record activities of Sir Malcolm Campbell and his son Donald Campbell.

== History ==
The Museum was established in Grange-over-Sands in 1978 as an extra attraction for the Holker Hall stately home. The museum was created by Donald Sidebottom to contain the collection of cars and related memorabilia that he had been collecting since the 1960s. In 2006, the collection was purchased by a subsidiary company of Winander Group Holdings Ltd, which also own Windermere Lake Cruises.

After more than thirty years at Holker Hall, the museum relocated to the site of the former Reckitt's Blue Dye Works carton packaging sheds at Backbarrow in 2010.

== The collection ==
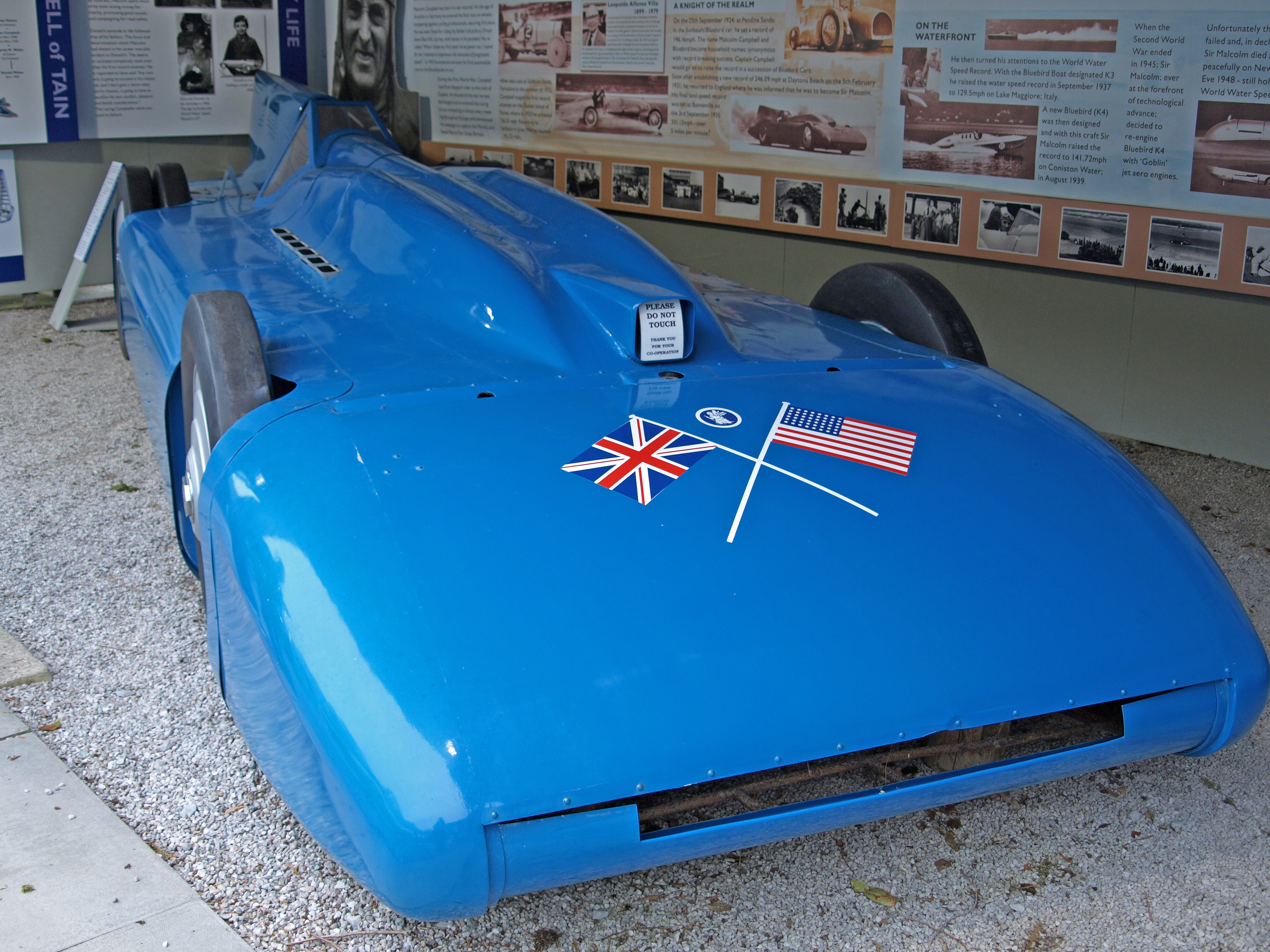
Replica Campbell-Railton Blue Bird

The museum features a unique collection of over 30,000 motoring related exhibits including a 1920s garage re-creation. Amongst the cars in the museum's collection are a 1913 Star 15.9, a 1936 Bentley 4¼-litre which was owned by Donald Campbell, a World War II Willys Jeep and a 1955 Jaguar XK140. The museum also houses an exhibition dedicated to Sir Malcolm Campbell and his son Donald and their land and water speed record activities.
