= Backbarrow =

Village in Cumbria, England

Coordinates: 54.25569°N 2.99155°W

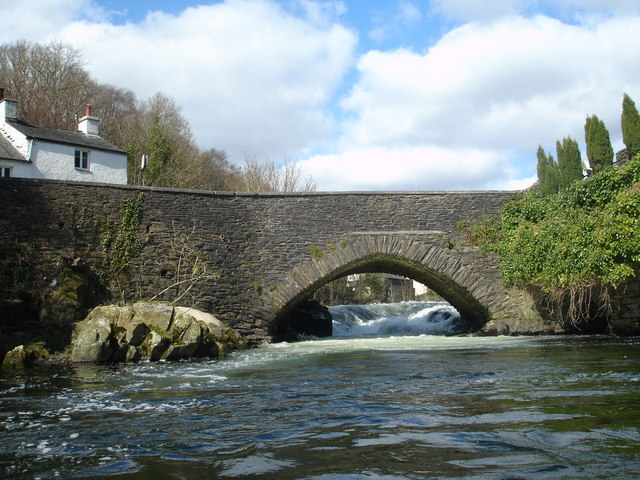
- The bridge at Backbarrow

- Location in South Lakeland Location within Cumbria
- OS grid reference: SD355849
- Civil parish: Haverthwaite
- Unitary authority: Westmorland and Furness
- Ceremonial county: Cumbria
- Region: North West
- Country: England
- Sovereign state: United Kingdom
- Post town: ULVERSTON
- Postcode district: LA12
- Dialling code: 015395
- Police: Cumbria
- Fire: Cumbria
- Ambulance: North West
- UK Parliament: Westmorland and Lonsdale

Backbarrow is a village in the Lake District National Park in England. It lies on the River Leven about 5 miles (8 km) northeast of Ulverston in Furness in the county of Cumbria.

== History ==
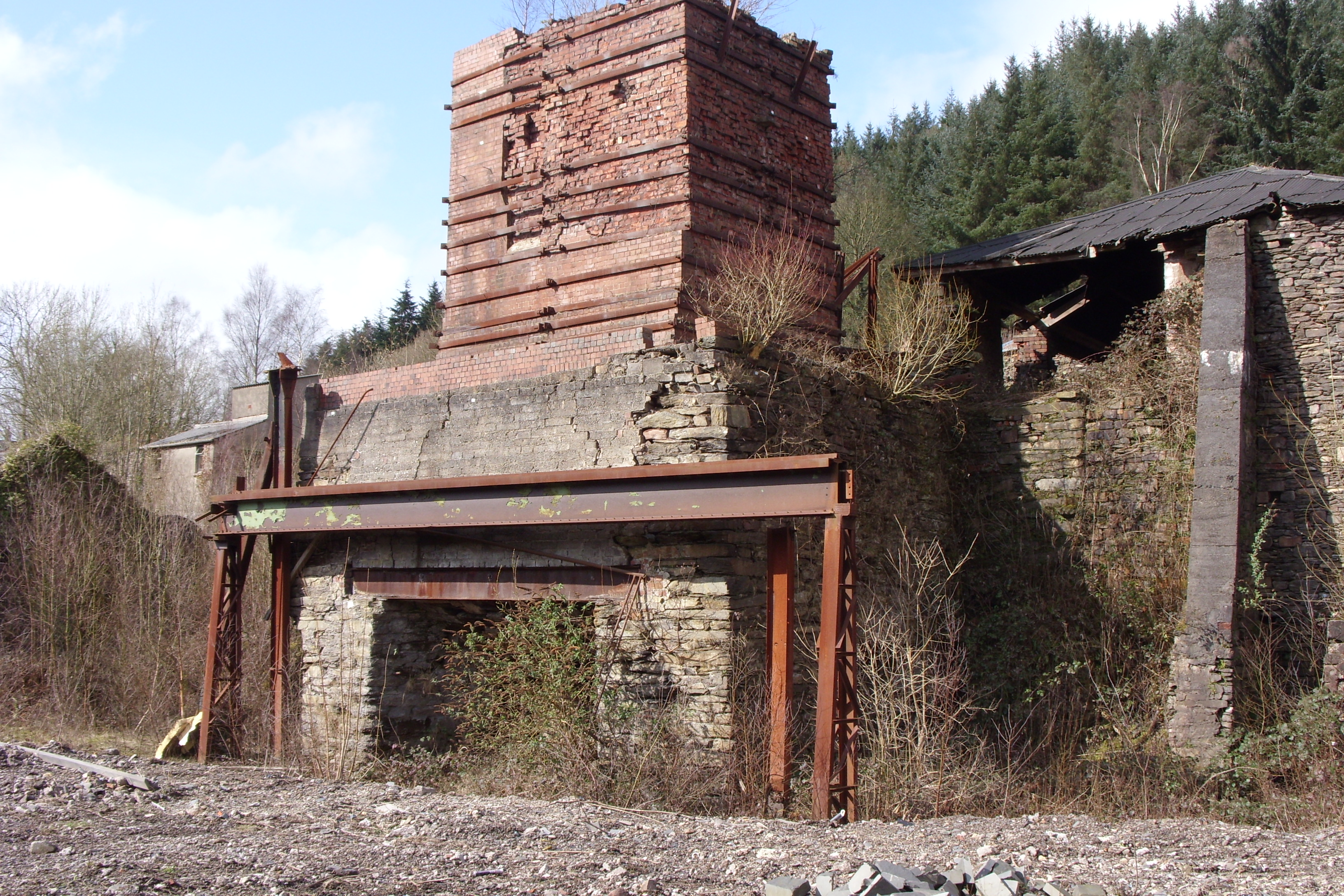
Remains of Backbarrow ironworks

Backbarrow probably grew during the Elizabethan period, due to the corn mills that were built along the river. Earlier mills at the site had been owned by Furness Abbey, which by this time had been dissolved. Development increased due to the iron furnace that was built in Backbarrow in 1711. The furnace has been described as the first efficient blast furnace. The cotton mills continued to grow in size during the Victorian period.

In 1868 an extension of the Furness Railway was built through the village to transport iron and products from the mills. Though the line was closed in the 1960s with the demise of the ironworks, the section from Haverthwaite to Lakeside, which passes through Backbarrow, remains open as a heritage railway (see Lakeside and Haverthwaite Railway).

Backbarrow was particularly associated with the production of the blue pigment ultramarine, or "dolly blue". The ultramarine factory was established in an old mill building by the Lancashire Ultramarine Company, then purchased by Reckitt & Sons in 1928. The 'blue mill' was well known locally, as dust from its production gave a blue tint to most of the village. Production of this continued until 1981. The factory site, which was known locally as "the bluemills", now accommodates a popular hotel and two blocks of apartments. A display of machinery used in the old factory is maintained by the hotel's proprietors while the old furnace, believed to be the only remaining example of its type, has been declared a Scheduled Ancient Monument and preserved as part of the Ironworks Apartments development.

Backbarrow was hit by the nationwide floods of November 2009, as the River Leven overflowed causing severe damage to the bridge's walls and both parts of the Whitewater Hotel, as well as the Swan Hotel in Newby Bridge, 1.3 miles further up the river.

In 2010 the Lakeland Motor Museum relocated from Holker Hall to the former site of the Reckitt's Blue Dye Works carton packaging sheds in Backbarrow.

== Geography and environment ==
The growth of the National Park led to an increase in tourism in the region. In particular, Backbarrow has great views of the turbulent nature of the River Leven, just south of Windermere. The river has also been used to develop a small hydro-electric plant, installed in 2000, generating electricity for the National Grid.

== Notable people ==
- Wilfred Lancaster (1904 – 1987), professional association footballer

== See also ==
- Listed buildings in Haverthwaite
