= Ralph de Greystoke, 3rd Baron Greystoke =

English peer and landowner

Arms of Greystoke: Barry argent and azure three chaplets of roses gules

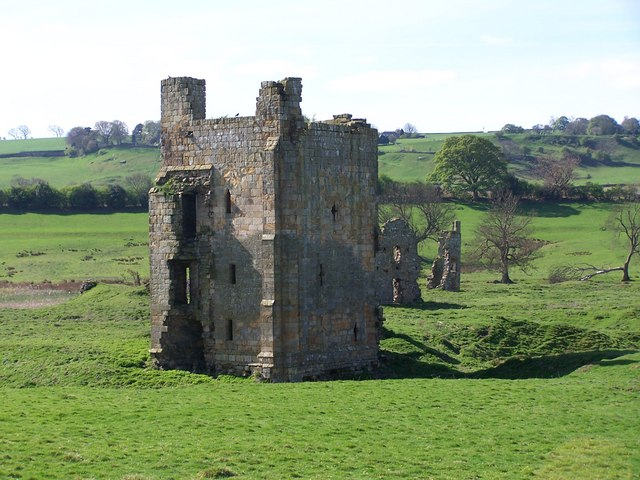
Ruins of Ravensworth Castle. Ralph de Greystoke was born here in 1353.

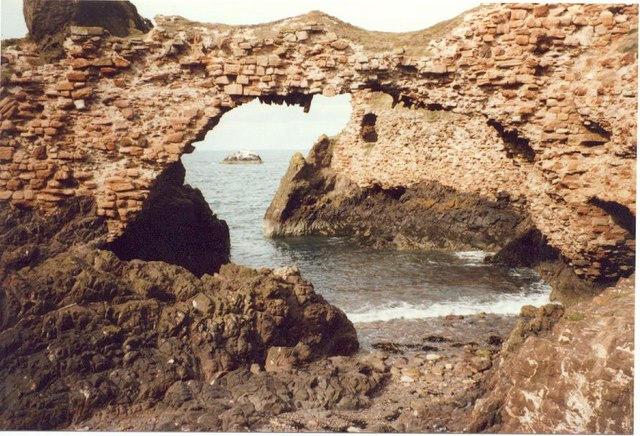
Ruins of Dunbar Castle where Ralph de Greystoke was held prisoner in 1384.

Ralph de Greystoke, 3rd Baron Greystoke, (18 October 1353 – 6 April 1418) was an English peer and landowner.

== Life ==
Greystoke was the son of William de Greystoke, 2nd Baron Greystoke, and Joane, daughter of Lord Fitzhugh, his second wife. He was born on 18 October 1353 at Ravensworth Castle, North Yorkshire, the home of his maternal uncle Henry. As he was still a child when his father died, his estates were placed under the guardianship of Roger de Clifford, 5th Baron de Clifford.

He was summoned to Parliament between 28 November 1375 and 5 October 1417, and, in the 1370s and 1380s, served as a warden of the Scottish Marches.

In 1384, he led an English force that was defeated by the Scots, under the command of George I, Earl of March, while they were travelling to Roxburgh. Greystoke was captured and taken to Dunbar Castle, where he was provided with a meal in the great hall, served upon his own dining-ware, which had been seized from his baggage train along with hangings that now decorated the walls of the great hall. Greystoke's ransom was 3,000 marks, and his younger brother William was his hostage in the exchange. While at Dunbar, William took ill with fever and died. William was buried at the castle, but two years later his remains were moved to Newminster Abbey in Northumberland, where his grandfather Ralph de Greystoke, 1st Baron Greystoke, was buried. Greystoke returned to fight the Scots in 1402 at the Battle of Humbleton Hill in Northumberland.

In the 1390s, "disillusioned" with the reign of Richard II, Greystoke backed the return of the exiled Henry of Bolingbroke, son of John of Gaunt and grandson of Edward III. Greystoke brought his own men to join those of the exile at Doncaster in 1399 and, after Richard II was deposed, with other northern English lords he remained loyal to Bolingbroke, who succeeded to the crown as Henry IV.

== Personal ==
Greystoke married Katherine, the daughter of his former guardian Roger de Clifford, 5th Baron de Clifford. They had two children: John de Greystoke, 4th Baron Greystoke, his heir, and Maude, who married Eudo de Welles, son of John de Welles, 5th Baron Welles.

They had 11 children according to GENI: Maud de Greystoke, Lady Gainsby; John de Greystoke, 4th Baron Greystoke; Anna de Greystoke; Thomas de Greystoke; Henry de Greystoke; Catharine Greystoke; William Greystoke; Alionora de Greystoke; Joan Bowes; Elizabeth de Greystoke and Ralph de Greystoke.

Geni - Ralph de Greystoke (1353-1418)- Ravensworth

Brother of Alice de Greystoke, Lady Harrington; William de Greystoke; Robert de Greystoke and John Greystoke

Greystoke died on 6 April 1418. At inquisitions following his death, his estate was assessed to include messuages, or "dwelling-houses", and land holdings in Westmorland, Northumberland, and Yorkshire, as well as the manors and castles of Greystoke and Morpeth.

Peerage of England
Preceded by William de Greystoke	Baron Greystock; 1359–1418	Succeeded by John de Greystoke
