= Johnby =

Hamlet in Cumbria, England

Coordinates: 54.688°N 2.879°W

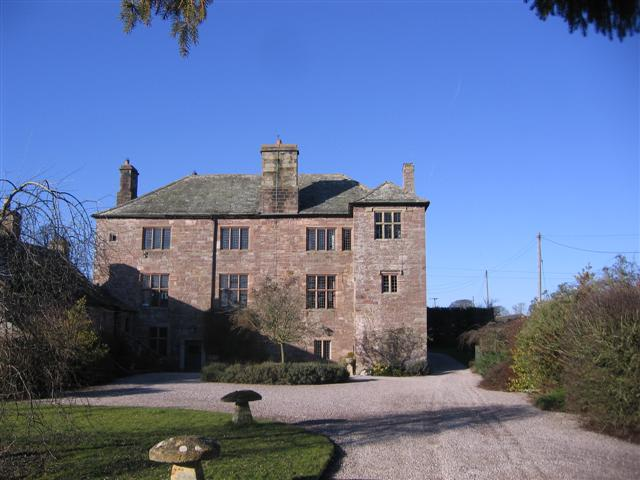
- Johnby Hall

- Location in Eden, Cumbria Location within Cumbria
- OS grid reference: NY433329
- Civil parish: Greystoke
- Unitary authority: Westmorland and Furness
- Ceremonial county: Cumbria
- Region: North West
- Country: England
- Sovereign state: United Kingdom
- Post town: PENRITH
- Postcode district: CA11
- Dialling code: 017684
- Police: Cumbria
- Fire: Cumbria
- Ambulance: North West
- UK Parliament: Westmorland and Lonsdale

Johnby is a hamlet in the Westmorland and Furness district, in the English county of Cumbria. It is about 6 miles (9.7 km) from the large town of Penrith and about 1 mile (1.6 km) from the village of Greystoke. The B5305 road, the B5288 road, the A66 road and the M6 motorway are all nearby. Circa 1870, it had a population of 92 as recorded in the Imperial Gazetteer of England and Wales.

To the south of the hamlet is Johnby Hall, a fortified house incorporating a peel tower dating probably from the 14th Century, with alterations and extensions in every century since.

== See also ==
- Listed buildings in Greystoke, Cumbria
