= Baron Greystoke =

Abeyant barony in the Peerage of England

Arms of Grymthorp, borne for Greystoke by the FitzWilliam descendants: Barry argent and azure three chaplets of roses gules

Baron Greystoke (or Greystock) is a title that has been created twice in the Peerage of England. It was first created when John de Greystok was summoned to Parliament in 1295.

== History ==
John son of William de Greystok was summoned to Parliament by Edward I of England. In 1296 John's cousin Gilbert Fitzwilliam, descendant of John's aunt Joan de Graystock, died, and Gilbert's younger brother and heir, Ralph Fitzwilliam, did homage for Gilbert's lands and entered thereon. In August 1297 John obtained licence to enfeoff Ralph Fitzwilliam with the manor and whole Barony of Greystok, and with other manors and advowsons including his part of Morpeth, in fee simple, upon condition that Ralph should found a college in the church at Greystoke. Ralph, whose family were lords of Grimthorpe in the soke of Pocklington, Yorkshire, was then preparing to go abroad in the King's service, and in April 1298 he in return demised the feudal barony of Greystok and other manors for life to John (who thenceforward held them from Ralph as Ralph's sub-tenant), with reversion to Ralph. In 1300 Ralph made some provision for John's brother William Greystok.

Following the death of John de Greystok in 1306, the Barony of Greystok reverted to Ralph FitzWilliam in fulfilment of the arrangements made eight years previously, and Ralph, who was summoned to Parliament from 1295 to 1315, made homage and received royal assent to enter upon the barony in October 1306. In 1315 he founded a chantry at the conventual church of Tynemouth, under the aegis and seal of St Albans Abbey, for the soul of John de Greystok "quondam baronis de Graistok cognati sui" (i.e., "sometime baron of Graystok, his kinsman"), and for his own soul, the abbey's award to him describing Ralph Fitzwilliam as Baro de Graystok and bearing his seal.

Ralph Fitzwilliam (who married Marjory de Bolebec) died in 1316, and their son Robert FitzRalph (who married Elizabeth, daughter of Robert Nevill of Scotton, Lincolnshire) died in the following year, leaving as his heir his son Ralph FitzRobert. This younger Ralph received Parliamentary summons in the name of Ralph de Greystock, and so became the first of the Fitzwilliam (Lords of Grymthorp) lineage to carry the Greystock name and title (1321). The arms of Greystock as Barruly argent and azure, three chaplets of roses gules were originally those of Grymthorp, and as such were borne by Ralph Fitzwilliam at the Siege of Caerlaverock, and serve to identify his tomb effigy rescued from Neasham Priory, but were retained and quartered with the former Greystock arms by his successors.

The barony went into abeyance in 1569, after it had passed into the Dacre family in 1487 through the marriage of Thomas Dacre, 2nd Baron Dacre to Elizabeth de Greystoke, 6th Baroness Greystoke.

== Barons Greystoke, first creation (1295) ==
- John de Greystoke, 1st Baron Greystoke (1264–1306)

== Barons Greystoke, second creation (1321) ==
- Ralph de Greystoke, 1st Baron Greystoke (1299–1323)
- William de Greystoke, 2nd Baron Greystoke (1320–1358)
- Ralph de Greystoke, 3rd Baron Greystoke (1352–1417)
- John de Greystoke, 4th Baron Greystoke (1390–1436)
- Ralph de Greystoke, 5th Baron Greystoke (1414–1487)
- Elizabeth de Greystoke, 6th Baroness Greystoke suo jure (10 July 1471 – 14 August 1516)
- William Dacre, 7th Baron Greystoke (1500–1563)
- Thomas Dacre, 8th Baron Greystoke (c. 1526–1566)
- George Dacre, 9th Baron Greystoke (1561–1569) (abeyant)
