= Ralph Fitzwilliam =

English noble

Coat of arms of Ralph Fitzwilliam, Lord of Greystoke at the Battle of Falkirk, Barry argent and azure three chaplets of roses gules.

Ralph Fitzwilliam (c. 1256 – 11 February 1317), or Ralph, son of William de Grimthorpe, Lord of Greystoke, was a feudal baron with extensive landholdings in the North of England, representative of a manorial lordship seated where Grimthorpe Hill rises to commanding views a mile to the north of Pocklington in the Yorkshire Wolds. He gave sustained military service and leadership through the Scottish and Welsh campaigns of Edward I and was summoned to parliament from 1295 to 1315. His marriage in c. 1282 brought him other manors including Morpeth in Northumberland and its appurtenances. In 1297 he was enfeoffed as tenant-in-chief (feudal lord) of the entire barony of Greystoke, seated at Greystoke in Cumberland but with Yorkshire estates, through his matrilineal Greystok descent. He entered upon these in his own right in 1306. Having served in the retinue of Aymer de Valence, during the first decade of Edward II's reign he remained dependable as a military leader and royal lieutenant in the defence administration of the northern counties and Scottish marches. His descendants adopted the Greystoke name, and their inheritance continued in the male line until the end of the 15th century.

== Family background ==
Ralph Fitzwilliam was born probably in 1256, for he is described as being 40 years old and more in 24 Edward I. He was the son of William FitzRalph, lord of Grimthorpe, Great Givendale, in the soke of Pocklington, in the Yorkshire Wolds. William his father was the son of an elder Ralph Fitz William. Their paternal ancestry is traced to one Ulf, possibly that notable son of Thorald who built the church of Aldbrough in Holderness. By a marriage in a subsequent generation they appear to have descended from Emma the daughter of Waldef, Lord of Neasham, and (before 1157) founding patron of the Priory of St Mary at Neasham, a small nunnery in the parish of Hurworth-on-Tees, near Darlington, County Durham.

Opinions have differed as to whether Joan de Greystok, daughter of Thomas de Greystok of Greystoke in Cumberland, was the mother or the grandmother of Ralph Fitzwilliam. In either case, that descent bore heavily upon his fortunes. William Dugdale, in his Baronage (following an earlier source), calls Ralph "the Son of William Fitz-Ralph, (Lord of Grimethorpe, in Com. Ebor.) Son of Ioane, Aunt to him the said Iohn" [i.e. Greystok], a formula which leaves room for confusion. The Fine rolls for 1268–1269 show that William Fitz-Ralph of Grimthorpe and his wife Joan paid half a mark for an assize. Somerset Herald John Charles Brooke took Joan to be the wife of the elder Ralph, William's father: the Dictionaries of National Biography, Cokayne's Complete Peerage, and others, take her to be William's wife.

== Reign of Edward I ==
=== Grimthorpe and Greystoke ===
William FitzRalph had a grant of free warren in his ancestral manor of Grimthorpe (just north-east of Pocklington), and in Hinderskelfe (the site of Castle Howard), in Yorkshire, in 1253. His kinsman, William son of Thomas de Greystok, entered his inheritance on the death of his brother Robert de Greystok, and had free warren in his manors of Brunnum (Nunburnholme, just east of Pocklington) and Ellerton, Yorkshire, in March 1257. William de Greystok acquired his part of Morpeth, Northumberland and the Merlay barony, by his marriage to Maria, daughter and coheir of Roger de Merlay. In musters at Worcester and Carmarthen in July 1277 Ralph FitzWilliam de Grimthorpe, son of William FitzRalph, proffered the military service due from his uncle William de Greystock in the wars against the Welsh: his service was transferred by the King to be performed under Edmund Earl of Lancaster in West Wales.

Marriages and offspring

At Ralph Fitzwilliam's death in 1317 his heir, his younger son Robert, was aged 40. Since Ralph's marriage to Marjory de Bolbec did not take place until 1281, it is inferred that there was a first marriage no later than 1275, though the name of the first wife, mother of Ralph's descendants, is not known.

In November 1281 Ralph obtained licence to marry Margery, widow of Nicholas Corbet, daughter and coheir of Hugh de Bolbec junior and his wife Theophania, paying for that a fine of 100 marks. This marriage brought to him a portion of the Bulbeck barony of Northumberland seated at the manor of Styford in the parish of Bywell, with Hedoun on the Wall, Angyrtoune (Morpeth) and Dodynton. Margery was one of four sisters, whose mother Margery de Bolebec was sister of Richard de Montfichet, of Avelina wife of William de Forz, 3rd Earl of Albemarle, and of Philippa, wife of Hugh de Playz. In 1274 Margery Corbet and her three sisters became heirs to their second cousin Aveline de Forz, Countess of Aumale, daughter of the 4th Earl of Albemarle and first wife of Edmund Crouchback. Around Michaelmas 1285 (13 Edward I) Ralph Fitzwilliam made a fine with John Yeland for the distribution of the moieties of that inheritance among his wife's sisters, the coheirs, making a gift of premises there and in Hertfordshire and Essex also to Yeland. He fought against the Welsh again (on his own account) in 1282 and in 1287, and received a royal gift of four deer from the Forest of Galtres in 1283.

Succession

William de Graystok, having been granted a market in Morpeth and free warren in Crosthwayt in Teesdale in 1285, died in 1288 and was succeeded by his son John de Graystock, "vir strenuus et corpulentus". In 1291 Ralph FitzWilliam was first summoned to serve against the Scots. In 1293–94 he and John de Greystock were the principal tenants affected when the King granted the manor of Pocklington to the abbot and convent of Meaux, Yorkshire, reserving wardship of various tenancies, in exchange for land at Wyk on Humber intended for the development of Kingston upon Hull. In August 1294 Graystok was granted licence to demise for life to Richard Mauleverer and Gilbert FitzWilliam (Ralph's brother), (who were then going into the King's service in Gascony, for service due from Graystok, who was excepted), lands worth 10 marks each in Horsley and Stanyngton.

In 1295 both John de Graystok and Ralph FitzWilliam were first summoned to parliament, Ralph becoming Baron by writ, and both were continually summoned thereafter. Graystok, who did not have sons of his own, had evidently conveyed Nunburnholme (formerly the caput baroniae of Robert de Greystok's Yorkshire fee) to Gilbert FitzWilliam, for Gilbert at his death in 1296 was holding Nunburnholme of the King in chief by homage. Gilbert was holding other tenements from his brother Ralph, then aged 40, who was declared to be Gilbert's nearest heir, and did homage for Gilbert's lands and entered upon them.

=== The Greystok barony ===
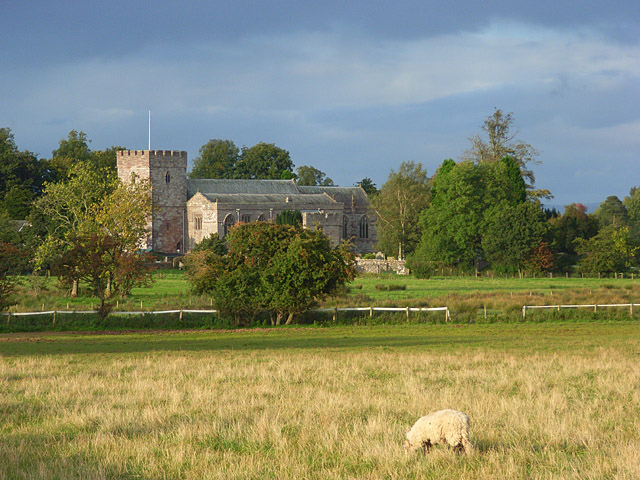
St Andrew's church, Greystoke, Cumbria

In August 1297 John obtained licence to enfeoff Ralph FitzWilliam (then going abroad on the King's service) with the manor and whole Barony of Greystok, and with other manors and advowsons including his part of Morpeth. These were conveyed in fee simple, upon condition that Ralph should found a college in the church at Greystoke in Cumberland. With licence dated April 1298, at Michaelmas 1299 Ralph in turn demised the barony and manors for life to John, with reversion to himself. By this concord, which was made under royal precept, Ralph became the tenant-in-chief, with John de Greystok as tenant holding the barony from Ralph. In 1300 Ralph made some provision for John's brother William Greystok.

=== Falkirk and Caerlaverock ===
Appointed captain of the royal garrisons in Northumberland in July 1297, Ralph was put in charge of Scarborough Castle in October, and for his services against the Scots was thanked in November and appointed one of the captains of the Scottish marches. In 1298 he had superintendence of the expenditure for the campaign against the Scots in Northumberland, upon his mandate or precept received and overseen by Walter de Agmondesham and Robert Heyroun according to the ordinances of John de Warenne, 6th Earl of Surrey.

On 8 June he was granted letters of protection to set forth for Scotland with the King, and on 12 June three of his men obtained their letters to accompany him. At the Battle of Falkirk, 22 July, he was among the English knights on the right wing of King Edward's army in the battalion led by Antony Bek, Bishop of Durham: he is listed in the Falkirk Roll of Arms as "Rauf le fiz Willam", his arms burlee dargent et dasur od troys chapeaux de goules. As leader and commander of the forces raised from the county of York, he was summoned continually for military service against the Scots at this time.

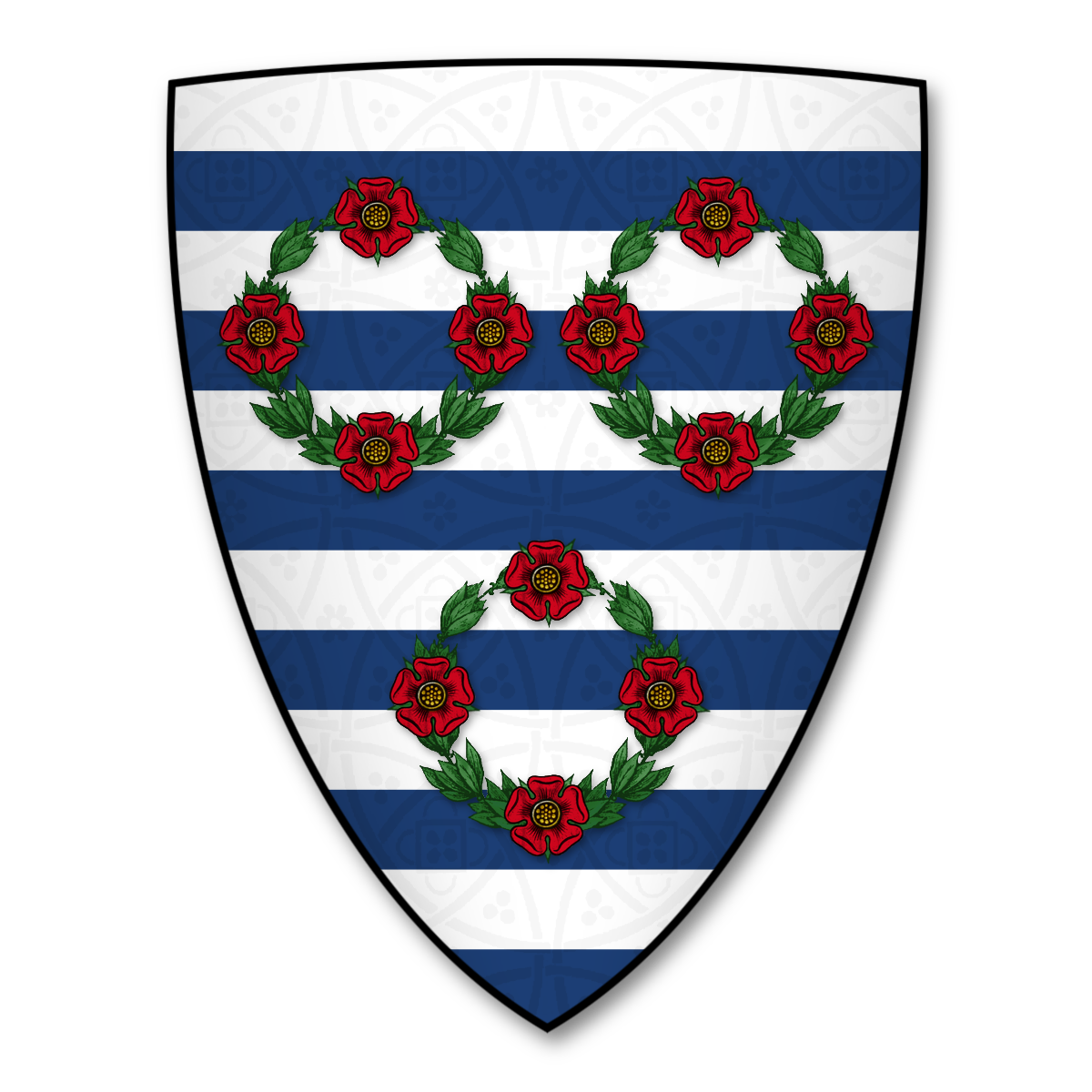
Arms of Rauf le FitzGuilleme: Barruly argent and azure, three chaplets of roses gules

In 1300 he participated in the siege of Caerlaverock. In the Old French words of the heraldic poem of Le Siege de Karlaverok, his blazon is described (K, verses 196-200):

"Rauf le filz Guilleme autrement
Ke cil de Valence portoit
Car en lieu des merlos mettoit
Trois chapeaus de rosis vermelles
Ki bien avienent a mervellez."
"Ralph Fitz William bore differently
That which de Valence did bear,
For in the martlets' place, he wore
Chaplets of roses, three, vermeilles,
Which were becoming, wondrous well."

This is the blazon which appears on Ralph FitzWilliam's seal in use in 1301, and until this time it was for the family of Grimthorpe, not of Greystoke: As Ralph FitzWilliam's descendants became the Barons of Greystoke, so the Grimthorpe arms became those associated with Greystoke. The siege of Caerlaverock occurred in July 1300: in the months following, an inquisition was commissioned to appraise Ralph's desire to grant six marks per annum to a chaplain to celebrate divine service daily forever in the chapel of the Blessed Mary of Grymthorpe, for Ralph's soul and the souls of his ancestors. The inquest, held in 1301-02, was favourable.

=== The Barons' letter ===
In 1301 Ralph FitzWilliam (as "Dominus de Grimthorpe") signed the letter of the barons to the pope, at the Lincoln parliament: John de Greystok, who was not at the parliament, also signed. Ralph was also employed as a representative of the East Riding before the exchequer in 1300, and as the king's agent was empowered to 'use all friendly ways' to exact a purveyance of grain from the Yorkshire monasteries in 1302. After a call in January 1303 to join his arms and force with John de Segrave to repress the Scots (an expedition defeated at the Battle of Roslin in February), he was summoned to attend Aymer de Valence with 13 men at arms in May 1303: "he to be retained and not allowed to leave the King's service as he did once before, giving a bad example to others, which offence he can only amend by now remaining constantly." Walter of Guisborough tells that in 1304 Ralph was commissioned with John de Barton to act as a justice to execute the statute of trailbaston (an itinerant judicial commission) in Yorkshire; but in the commissions of trailbaston in 1305 his name does not appear.

In 1303 he sought seisin of his moiety title of one-fourth part of eighteen manors in Northumberland, held in chief by the service of an eighth part of two knight's fees, arising from his transaction by fine (under royal licence) with John Yeland, but which had been subinfeudated and were claimed by the tenants under Custom of England. Hearings in the Trinity term of 1304 suggest that Marjory, Ralph's wife, was by then dead, and a dispute had arisen between a younger John Yeland and Marjory's nephew John of Lancaster. Problems over the estate continued in 1313.

=== Reversion of the Barony ===
Following the death of John de Greystok, it was in 1306 that the Barony of Greystok reverted to Ralph FitzWilliam in fulfilment of the arrangements made eight years previously, and Ralph entered upon these lands in November 1306. Ralph was then completing a term of six months (from Easter to Michaelmas) with ten men at arms in the company of Aymer de Valence in the King's army against Scotland. He was immediately challenged, without success, for one-third of the manor of Greystoke as dower, by the Greystok widow, who claimed that she had been driven away by her husband. In December 1310 he received a grant, to him and his heirs, of free warren in his demesne lands in Brunnum (Nunburnholme), Butterwyk, Thorpe Bassett, Scakelthorp, Thornton in the Moor, Norton upon Swale and Wellebyry, in Yorkshire, and in Benton, Killingworth, Hepiscotes, Tranwell, Stannyngton and Horsle, Northumberland.

== Reign of Edward II ==
=== Northern Justice ===
In the reign of Edward II Ralph attached himself to the baronial opposition. In 1309 he was appointed a justice to receive in Northumberland complaints of prises taken contrary to the statute of Stamford. On his own behalf he became involved in a suit in 1305 concerning the manor of Brierton, County Durham: from this he had purchased a rent worth £30 and more, but the feoffee, Geoffrey de Hartlepool, refused to pay him. Geoffrey attempted a plea in Parliament, but the cause is notable for the light it sheds on the episcopal jurisdiction of the County Palatine, back to which the case was repeatedly referred, continuing unresolved until 1315.

Ralph was appointed constable of Barnard Castle by Bishop Bek, under whom he served as a justice for the liberty, and under Richard Kellaw (bishop, 1311–1316) he served as a keeper of the peace. It appears from a letter of c. 1312, when Fitzwilliam's men were preventing Geoffrey from harvesting at Brierton, that, by appealing to the legal authority of the liberty rather than to the feudal authority of Robert Clifford (who was killed in 1314), Geoffrey was seeking to enlist Bishop Kellaw's influence towards Fitzwilliam, though the bishop was reluctant or unable to exercise it to a sufficient extent. Kellaw could remember that, when subprior in 1301, his plea (in a matter of £200 damages) for observance of royal protection (or any such writ not the bishop's) had been refused by Ralph Fitzwilliam, William de Crompton and John de Crepping, Justices of the franchise.

Retinue

In August 1311 (5 Edward II), at Hinderskelf, Ralph FitzWilliam, Lord Greystoke [sic] retained Nicholas, son of Thomas de Hastings by indenture to serve him during his life,

"as well in the times of Peace, as in War; in the time of War, with two Yeomen, well mounted and arrayed; and in time of Peace, two Yeomen and four Grooms. In consideration of which Service, he was to have all Accoutrements for his own Body; as also two Robes yearly, and one Saddle, according to the Dignity of a Knight; and in case he should lose any Great Horse in the War, to have Recompence therefore, according to the Estimation of two Men. Moreover, That at what place soever he the said Raphe should reside in the County of York, this Nicholas should repair to him, upon notice, with allowance of his reasonable Charges, and Wages for his Servants, both in War and Peace." Ralph Lord Greystoke granted him £8 per annum out of the manor of Thorpe Basset, and this sum continued to be paid to Hastings's descendants.

In his will of 1311, William le Vavasour of Hazlewood made the handsome bequest to Ralph Fitzwilliam of a lorica (body armour), an iron helmet and a Gascon lance. Fitzwilliam was summoned to York to confer with the King upon affairs of state in February 1312.

=== Defence of the North ===
In 1313 he was among the adherents of Thomas of Lancaster who received a pardon for their complicity in the death of Piers Gaveston. In the same year he was (with John de Mowbray, William de Ros and John de Segrave the elder) made "custos" in Cumberland, Northumberland and the Marches, and also of Berwick-upon-Tweed: a royal order for payment for the company in Ralph's garrison in Berwick was issued in April 1314. He became guardian of the castles and lands which had belonged to Sir Robert de Clifford, (who was killed at the Battle of Bannockburn in June 1314), and in September 1314 received instructions to surrender Brough Castle to Clifford's widow Matilda as part of her dower. He was one of the justices of oyer and terminer in Cumberland and Westmorland for the trial of offenders indicted before the conservators of the peace.

In January 1315 the magnates of the north renewed his appointment as one of the wardens of the Marches. The king ratified their choice, and nominated him captain and warden of Newcastle upon Tyne and of all Northumberland. In that year Ralph, who was a benefactor of Tynemouth Priory, founded a chantry at the church of Tynemouth for the repose of John de Greystok's soul. In March 1315 he was further appointed captain and warden of Carlisle and of the adjoining marches. As Keeper of Carlisle, Cumberland, Westmorland and Lancashire, in February 1316 he reported that Thomas de Vere had fulfilled his obligation to provide 20 men at arms for three months, in penalty for his unlicensed marriage. In June 1316 he was appointed one of the wardens to defend Yorkshire against the Scots. The last writ addressed to him as a commissioner of array was on 15 September 1316.

=== Death and memorial ===
He died therefore at the height of his authority and usefulness, aged about 60, perhaps around All Hallows 1316, certainly before February 1317, when the writ for the first of a series of inquisitions upon his many lands was issued. He is said to have been buried in Neasham Priory, Durham. A monumental effigy discovered in the ruins of that house, and formerly kept in a garden at Hurworth, was recognized by Robert Surtees to be his:

"a very gallant monumental effigy of a Baron of Greystoke... The effigy is, as usual, recumbent; the hands elevated and clasped on the breast; the sword hangs from a rich baldric ornamented with quatrefoils, the shield represents a barry coat semée of crosslets [sic], the legs are mutilated but rest on a lion, which seems defending himself against several dogs."

The figure is now preserved in Hurworth church (which also has a de Roos effigy): the heraldry shows barry with (not crosslets but) chaplets, for Grimthorpe, afterwards Greystock.

== Family ==
Fitzwilliam is presumed to have married twice. Nothing is known of the first marriage except that it is likely to have occurred in or a little before 1275, and produced two sons:

- William fitz Ralph, the elder son, who is reported to have married Catharina, but predeceased his father without offspring.
- Robert fitz Ralph (born c. 1277), who entered upon his brother's lands in Northumberland in 1297, and succeeded his father. He married Elizabeth Nevill of Scotton, Lincolnshire. He resided in the manor of Butterwick, but died before the end of 1317, when he was buried at Butterwick with a monumental effigy of his own. His widow long survived him, dwelt at Butterwick, and by her will was buried beside him there. Their son and successor was
  - Ralph (son of Robert), 1299–1323, aged 17 in 1317, who became Ralph de Greystoke, 1st Baron Greystoke, and was buried at Newminster Abbey.

In 1281 Ralph Fitzwilliam obtained licence to marry Marjory, daughter and coheiress of Hugh de Bolebec and Margery de Montfichet, and widow of Nicholas Corbet. Marjory died before 1303.

The barony remained in the family until 1487, when it passed by the distaff side to Thomas Dacre, 2nd Baron Dacre and to the Barons Dacre of Gilsland.
