= Johnby Hall =

Manor house in Greystoke, Cumbria

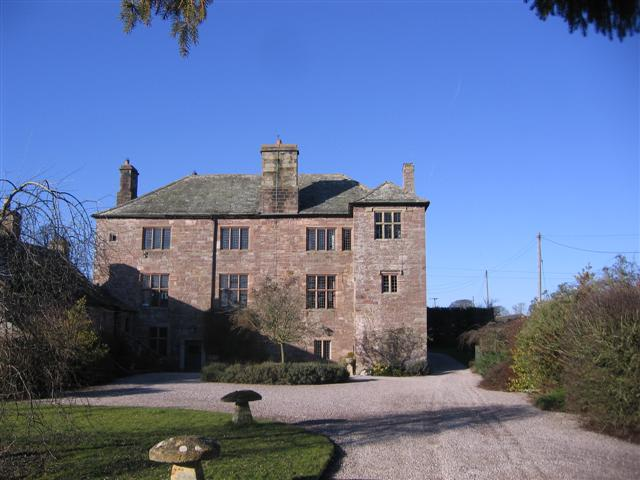

- Location of the Johnby Hall in Cumbria
- 54°41′12.3″N 2°52′44.4″W
- Type: Tower house
- Location: Near Greystoke, Cumbria

History
- Built: 1583, incorporating an older defensive tower
- Built for: William Musgrave and Isabel Martindale

Listed Building – Grade II*
- Designated: 1967
- Reference no.: 1326690

Johnby Hall is a fortified manor house near Greystoke, Cumbria. It was built in 1583, incorporating the fabric of a medieval tower house, and has been extended and modified a number of times since then. It was designated a Grade II* Listed Building in 1967, and is currently run as a bed and breakfast.

== Description ==
Johnby Hall is built around a tower house, standing three storeys tall, built of pink sandstone rubble, with a staircase projecting to the south at its east end. It bears an hourglass-shaped inscription over the entrance, recording its construction by William Musgrave and Isabel Martindale, who added apartments and a hall to the original tower, giving the building its current L plan. The ground floor is barrel vaulted, and the roof of the stairway features ribbed umbrella vaulting reminiscent of that found at nearby Carlisle Cathedral.

Next to the main building, and linked to it by a later passageway, is a bastle known as Kelly House. Its entrance, reached by an external flight of stairs, is dated 1637 and bears the initials WM and GM, for the widow Winifred Musgrave and her daughter Grace.

== History ==
Johnby Hall is first mentioned in 1200, and there are records of it being sold in 1300 and again in 1326, which is probably the time when the defensive tower, which now forms the main part of the house, was built.

In 1583, William Musgrave and Isabel Martindale had the current house built around the existing tower, adding a vaulted extension and the staircase tower. The building was modified in 1747, with the addition of a new central doorway and sash windows, and in 1783 the building was absorbed into the Greystoke Estate. Further modifications to the building were made in 1897, when Maud Leyborne-Popham installed a new doorway, replaced the sash windows with large moulded windows featuring mullions and transoms, and built the passageway that links the bastle to the main house.

The building was designated a Grade II* listed building on 27 December 1967.

== Current usage ==
Johnby Hall is still used as a domestic building, and is run as a bed and breakfast.

== See also ==
- Listed buildings in Greystoke, Cumbria
