= William de Greystoke, 2nd Baron Greystoke =

English peer and landowner (1321–1359)

Arms of Greystoke: Barry argent and azure three chaplets of roses gules

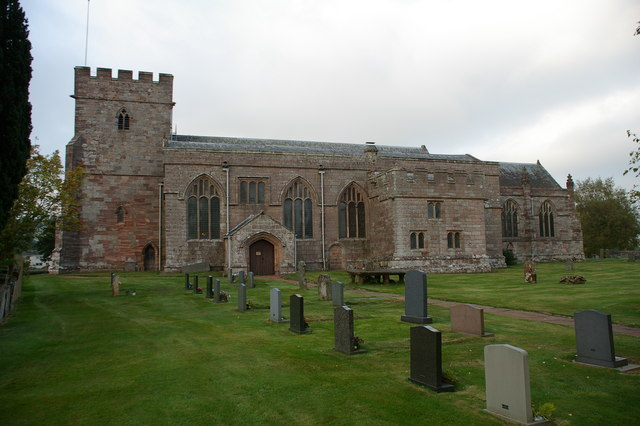
St Andrew's Church, Greystoke, Cumbria. Burial place of William Greystoke in 1359.

William Greystoke, 2nd Baron Greystoke, (6 January 1321 – 10 July 1359) of Greystoke in Cumbria, was an English peer and landowner.

== Origins ==
Greystoke was the son of Ralph de Greystoke, 1st Baron Greystoke, and his wife Alice, daughter of Hugh, Lord Audley.

== Career ==
He was born at the family home in Grimthorpe (in Great Givendale, near Pocklington, in the Yorkshire Wolds), on 6 January 1321. Greystoke's father died while he was still a child and he became a ward of his mother's second husband, Ralph Neville, 2nd Baron Neville de Raby, until he reached his majority in 1342. During the next ten years he was involved, on the English side, in the Hundred Years' War between the Kingdom of England and the Kingdom of France and was present at the Siege of Calais in 1346. He served under Edward, the Black Prince, in France. He participated in the Northern Crusades of Henry of Grosmont, 1st Duke of Lancaster to Prussia in 1351–2. In the early 1350s he was involved in the negotiations to secure the release of King David II of Scotland, who had been taken prisoner at the Battle of Neville's Cross on 17 October 1346. Greystoke was made a captain of Berwick-upon-Tweed, but due to his service in France, he was not present when the town fell to the Scots in August 1355. In October 1353 Greystoke received a royal licence to crenellate "his dwelling place", later known as Greystoke Castle. He was also responsible for renovations on Morpeth Castle which he also owned.

== Marriages and children ==
He married twice and had children by his second wife only:

- Firstly to Lucy de Lucie, daughter of Thomas de Lucy, 2nd Baron Lucy (died 1365), but the marriage was childless, and they divorced. During this time, his stepfather, Ralph Neville, unsuccessfully proposed that Greystoke should name his half-brothers, Ralph, Robert, and William Neville, as his heirs.
- Secondly he married Joane FitzHugh, daughter of Baron Fitzhugh, by whom he had four children:
  - Ralph Greystoke, 3rd Baron Greystoke, eldest son and heir.
  - Robert Greystoke;
  - William Greystoke alias Adamson;
  - Alice Greystoke, the first wife of Robert Harington, 3rd Baron Harington (1356–1406) of Gleaston Castle in the manor of Aldingham in Furness, Lancashire.

== Death and burial ==
Greystoke died on 10 July 1359, at Brancepeth Castle, the seat of his step-father Ralph Neville, 2nd Baron Neville de Raby, and was buried in the parish church of St. Andrew's in Greystoke, Cumbria, with a mass conducted by Gilbert Welton, Bishop of Carlisle. His funeral took place with "great pomp and solemnity", and was attended by great personages including: Roger Clifford, 5th Baron Clifford, Henry Scrope, 1st Baron Scrope of Masham, Thomas, Baron Musgrave, the Abbot of Holmcultram Abbey and the Abbot of Shap Abbey.

Peerage of England
Preceded by Ralph Greystoke	Baron Greystock; 1323–1359	Succeeded by Ralph Greystoke
