= Henri de Grandson =

Son of Pierre I de Grandson

Henri de Grandson was the son of Pierre I de Grandson and Agnes, a younger brother of the important friend and envoy of King Edward I of England, Otto de Grandson. Like his cousin Guillaume de Champvent and relative Gérard of Vuippens he pursued a church and diplomatic career in England before becoming taking up an important bishopric within the Holy Roman Empire.

He crossed the channel with his brother, Edward having granted two years protection on 26 May 1276. Henri travelled to the far north of Edward's realm to take up a position as parson of the church in Greystoke, then in the county of Cumberland. The church at Greystoke, Cumbria had been recently built in 1255. Some features from Henri's time remain still. The rood beam bridging the chancel arch is the oldest item in the Church, and carries floral emblems representing the wounds of Christ. The ancient choir stalls in the chancel have some well preserved misericords (carved shelf underneath the seat).

In 1278 Henri moved south once more to take up the role of Bishop of Verdun, from his recently deceased brother, Gerard de Grandson. Verdun, then not yet in France, was a prestigious Prince Bishopric within the Holy Roman Empire.
