= Nevill baronets =

Extinct baronetcy in the Baronetage of England

There have been two baronetcies created for persons with the surname Nevill, both in the Baronetage of England. Both creations are extinct.

The Nevill baronetcy, of Holt in the County of Leicester, was created in the Baronetage of England on 25 May 1661 for Thomas Nevill. The title became extinct on his death in 1712.

The Nevill baronetcy, of Grove in the County of Nottingham, was created in the Baronetage of England on 24 February 1675 for Edward Nevill, subsequently Member of Parliament for East Retford. He was a descendant of Sir Robert Nevill, of Eldon, fourth son of Ralph Neville, 2nd Baron Neville de Raby (great-uncle of Ralph de Neville, 1st Earl of Westmorland). Nevill was childless and the title became extinct on his death in 1685.

== Nevill baronets, of Holt (1661) ==
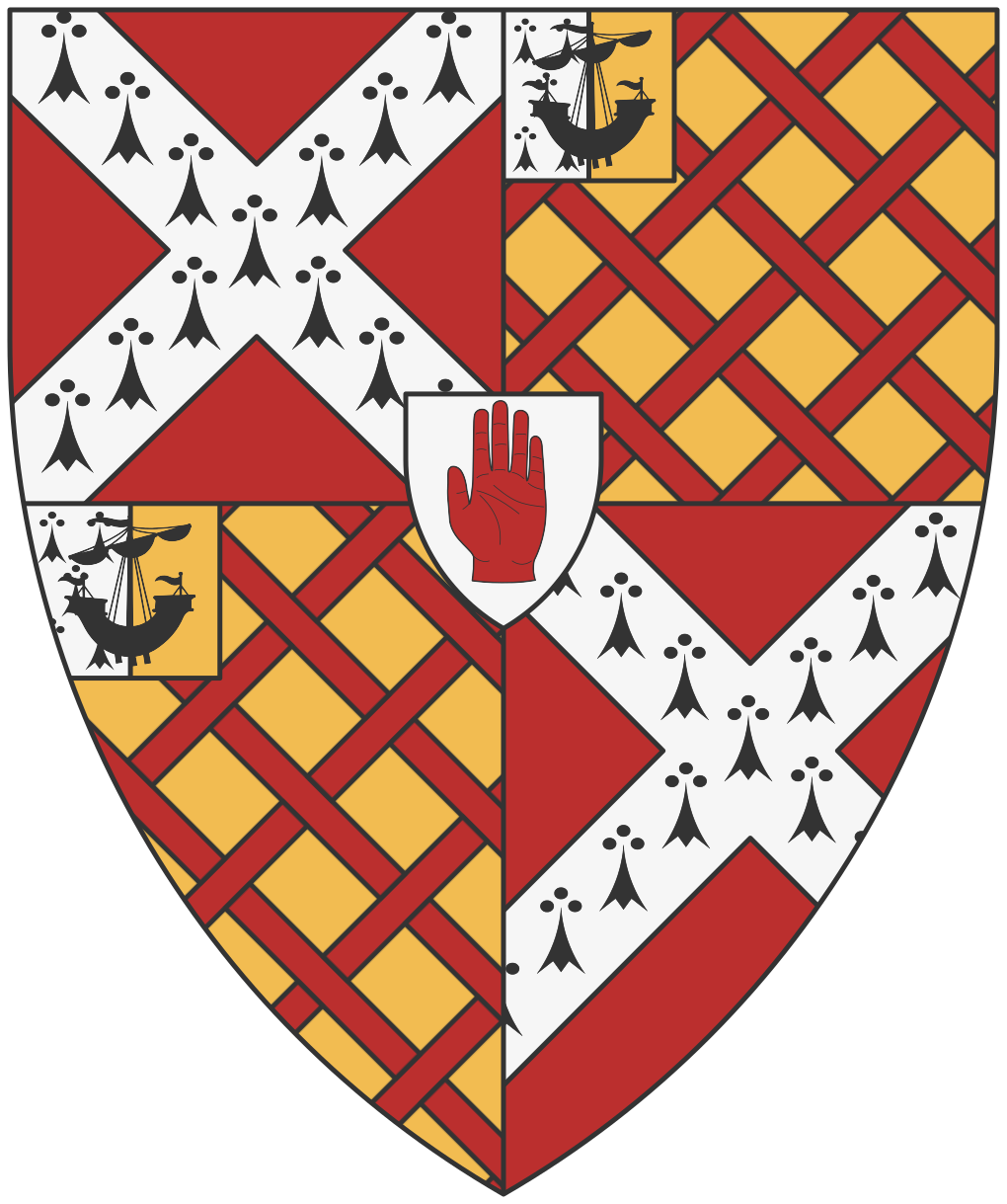
The coat of arms of Nevill of Holt, Baronets.

- Sir Thomas Nevill, 1st Baronet (c. 1625–1712)

== Nevill baronets, of Grove (1675) ==
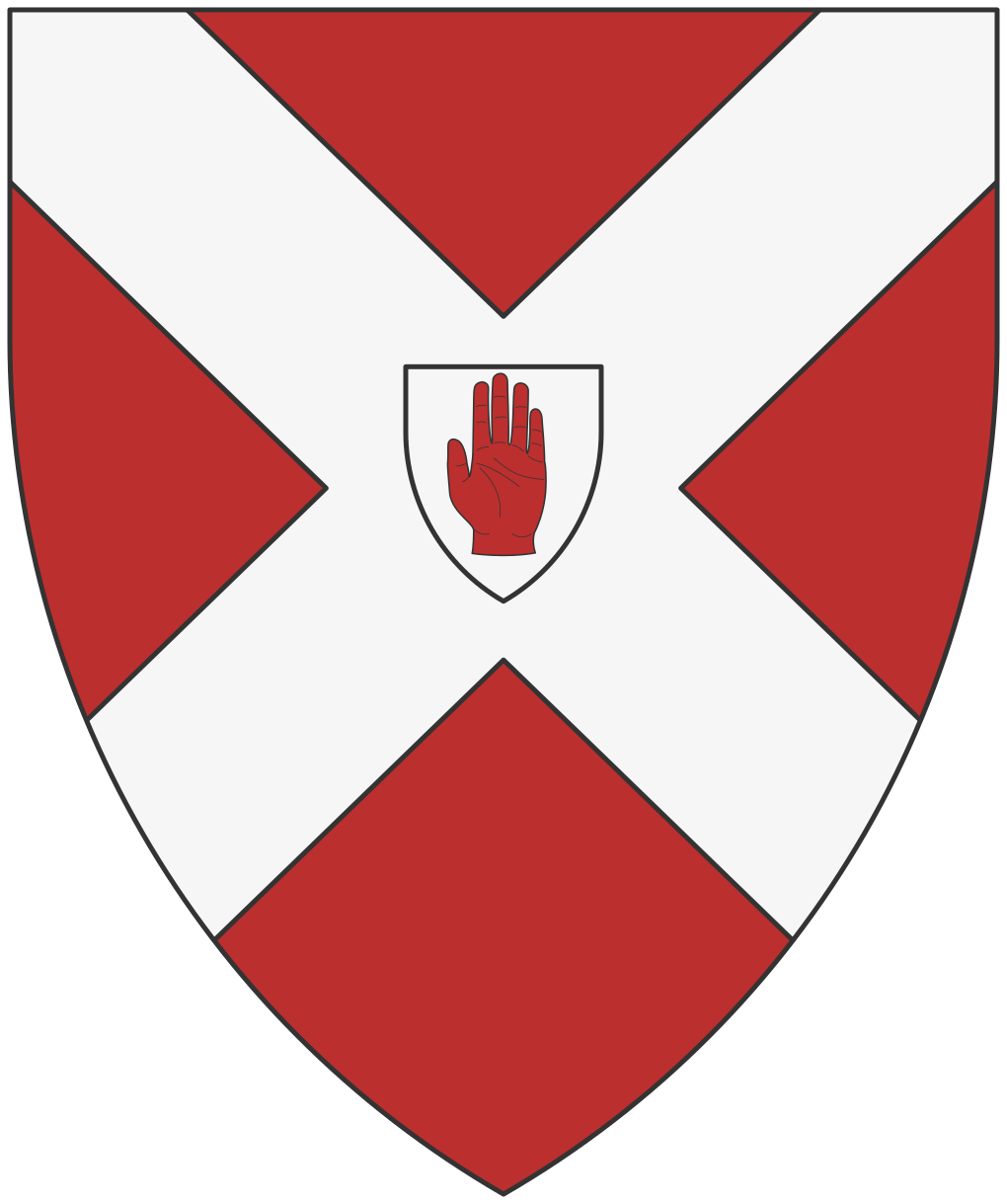
The coat of arms of Nevill of Grove, Baronets.

- Sir Edward Nevill, 1st Baronet (c. 1651–1685)

== See also ==
- Baron Neville de Raby
- Earl of Westmorland
- Neville baronets
