= Ralph Greystoke, 5th Baron Greystoke =

English baron (1406–1487)

Arms of Greystoke: Barry argent and azure three chaplets of roses gules

Ralph Greystoke, 5th Baron Greystoke (9 September 1406 – 1 June 1487) was a member of the English nobility in the early 15th century, and a protagonist during the Wars of the Roses in the north. By his marriage to Elizabeth, daughter of William, Lord FitzHugh he formalized the long-standing alliance that had existed between the two families for some time.

== Biography ==
Ralph was the eldest son of John de Greystoke, 4th Baron Greystoke by his second wife, Elizabeth Ferrers, daughter of Robert Ferrers, 3rd Baron Ferrers of Wem. At age 22, he succeeded his father in the barony after the latter's death in 1436.

A resident of Greystoke Castle in Cumberland, he was frequently called upon to the king's service in matters concerning the English-Scotland border. He was summoned to parliament in 1436, 1439, 1441, and 1485.

In 1444, Greystoke escorted the king's new bride, Margaret d'Anjou back to England, as part of the duke of Suffolk's embassy.

== Wars of the Roses ==
In July 1447, Greystoke sealed an indenture with Richard Neville, 5th Earl of Salisbury promising to ride with the earl "in time of peace and of war." When the Earl of Salisbury allied with Richard of York against the duke of Somerset's regime in February 1454, as a royal councilor Greystoke aided Richard, Duke of York to gain permission to open parliament, and become Protector. He again supported Salisbury that summer, being part of a commission of Oyer and Terminer which investigated Percy adherents from the previous year's feud between the Percies and the Nevilles. Later that year he was instructed by the Yorkist government to raise troops in Yorkshire to assist in crushing disorder that had broken out in neighbouring Lancashire.

However, in a political reversal not uncommon for the period, after the rout of Salisbury and York at Ludlow in October 1459, and their self-imposed exiles in Calais and Ireland respectively, he apparently swore an oath of fealty to the Lancastrians at the Parliament of Devils which in October attainted the Yorkists. He may have fought for the king at the Battle of Wakefield the next year, which resulted in the deaths of York and Salisbury, and also on the victorious Lancastrian side at the Second Battle of St Albans in early 1461. However, it has been suggested that as he was probably absent from the decisive Battle of Towton two months later, which led to the accession of York's eldest son as King Edward IV of England, this possibly demonstrates that his loyalties to the Nevilles had never diminished, and that in spite of Wakefield and St Albans, "he had been playing a double game" since Ludford.

== Marriage and issue ==
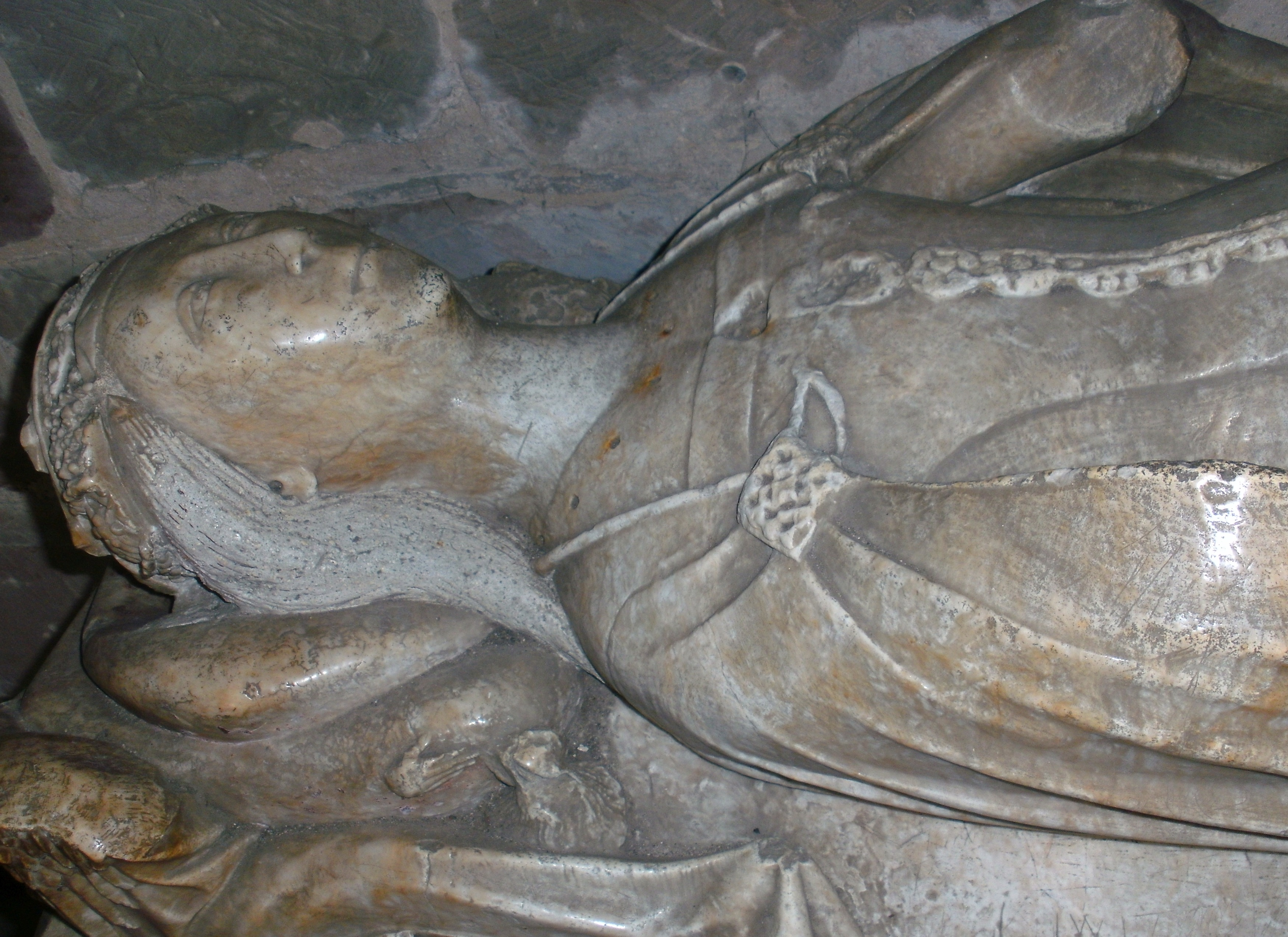
Effigy of Elizabeth Talbot (née Greystoke, died 1490) in St John the Baptist Church, Bromsgrove.

He married Elizabeth FitzHugh, daughter of the fourth Baron FitzHugh. They had several children, including:

1. Elizabeth (died 1490) who married firstly Thomas Scrope, 5th Baron Scrope of Masham, and secondly, Sir Gilbert Talbot of Grafton, KG (died 1517/18). Her second husband was the lord of the manor of Grafton Manor in Worcestershire.
2. Sir Robert Greystoke (c. 1443-1483), who married Elizabeth Grey, daughter of Edmund Grey, 1st Earl of Kent. Sir Robert had one daughter, also named Elizabeth, who succeeded her grandfather in the barony as Elizabeth, 6th Baroness Greystoke. She in turn married Thomas Dacre, 2nd Baron Dacre, transferring the Greystoke titles and lands into the Dacre family.
3. Margaret (or Margery), married Sir Thomas Grey of Chllingham (d. 16 August 1498). Their daughter Anne married three times: (1) Sir John Delaval of Seaton-Delaval, Sheriff of Northumberland (d. 4 February 1498); (2) Thos. Hopton; and (3) Phillip Dacre.

Peerage of England
Preceded by John de Greystoke	Baron Greystoke; 1436–1487	Succeeded by Elizabeth Dacre
