= John de Barton =

John de Barton (fl. 1304) was an English judge.

From Yorkshire, Barton was also known as de Ryton and de Fryton. He was with Ralph Fitzwilliam, the king's lieutenant in Yorkshire, as a member of the itinerary court constituted by the first commission of Trailbaston for Yorkshire, for which Hemingford gives a date of 1304. A parliamentary writ of 23 November 1304 is addressed to Barton and Fitzwilliam, with two others, but their names do not appear in the later and greater commission for all the counties. He was appointed a commissioner to inquire as to a specie chest found on the Yorkshire coast and claimed as wreck by the king, and also in 8 Edward II to levy scutage in Yorkshire.

In 24 Edward I Barton was summoned to military service against the Scots, and was on the commission of array for Yorkshire in 28 Edward I, and again in 31 Edward I.
