= John Greystoke, 4th Baron Greystoke =

Arms of Greystoke: Barry argent and azure three chaplets of roses gules

John Greystoke, 4th Baron Greystoke (c. 1390–1436), son and heir of Ralph Greystoke, 3rd Baron Greystoke, was a member of the northern English nobility in the early fifteenth century.

== Royal service ==
Born c. 1390, on his father's death and his elevation to the title, Greystoke "soon became enmeshed in border politics and Anglo-Scottish negotiations." He was appointed constable of Roxburgh Castle in 1421, being paid £1,000 p.a. during time of truce and double that in time of war, for a four-year contract, when he was replaced by Sir Robert Ogle. Twice, in 1424, and again six years later, he was a member of ambassadorial expeditions to treat with the Scots. The first of these discussions resulted in a truce with Scotland in March. Indeed, this embassy also took the role of providing an escort back to Scotland for the newly married James I who had recently married the king's cousin Joan. The second resulted in a further- tenuous- extension to the truce, a not insignificant achieving in view, as one historian has put it, of the fact that Greystoke and his fellow negotiators ran the gauntlet "whilst on Scottish soil."

Service to the crown was not however confined to the border; in 1430-1 he acted, at the behest of the royal council, as a royal commissioner to collect loans amounting to £400 to assist in the prosecution of the French wars. He acted as an adjudicator in local gentry quarrels, alongside peers such as the earl of Northumberland.

== Wealth and regional influence ==
In the Income Tax of 1436, he was assessed at an income of £650 p.a, and although never belonging to the higher echelons of the northern nobility, his family has been described as being regionally "a force to be reckoned with," in a relatively compact area that "jostled" with such landowning families. Although traditionally the Greystoke family had been retained by the Percies, Earls of Northumberland, by the 1430s John had come within the sphere of Richard Neville, 5th Earl of Salisbury.

He was known for his piety, bequeathing valuable items to his father's clerical college, including vestments, ornaments, "and lead to repair the choir."

== Personal life ==
Greystoke was married to Elizabeth Ferrers, though the date of their union is unknown. She was born in 1393, a daughter of Joan Beaufort, a cousin of the king, by her first marriage to Sir Robert Ferrers. They had a son, Ralph, who later succeeded to the barony. He dictated his will on 10 July 1436; dead less than a month later, he was buried, according to his wish, in Greystoke church.

Peerage of England
Preceded by Ralph de Greystoke	Baron Greystock; 1418–1436	Succeeded by Ralph de Greystoke
