= Ranulph Neville, 1st Baron Neville =

English nobleman

Ranulph Neville 1st Baron Neville
- Arms of Neville: Gules, a saltire argent
- Born: 18 October 1262
- Died: c. 18 April 1331 (aged 68)
- Resting place: Coverham Abbey, Yorkshire
- Spouses: Euphemia Clavering; Margery de Thwenge
- Children: Ralph Neville, 2nd Baron Neville (among others)
- Parent(s): Robert de Neville; Mary FitzRanulf
- Family: Neville

Ranulph Neville, 1st Baron Neville (18 October 1262 – c. 18 April 1331) of Raby Castle, County Durham, was an English nobleman and head of the powerful Neville family.

== Origins ==
He was the eldest son of Robert de Neville (who predeceased his own father) by his wife Mary FitzRanulf, one of the three daughters and co-heiresses of Ralph FitzRanulf (d. 1270) of Middleham Castle in Yorkshire. Ranulph was heir to his grandfather Sir Robert de Neville (d. 1282) of Raby.

== Marriages and children ==
Neville married twice:

Arms of de Clavering: Quarterly or and gules, a bend sable

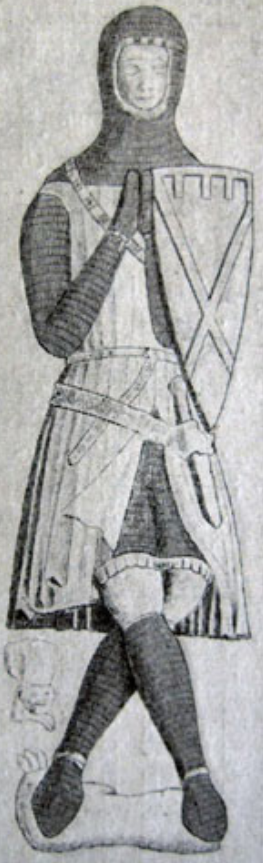
Effigy in St Brandon's Church, Brancepeth, of Sir Robert Neville (d. 1319) "Peacock of the North", in style of a cross-legged crusader. On his shield he displays the arms of Neville with a label of three points for the difference of an eldest son

- Firstly to Euphemia de Clavering, daughter and heiress of John de Clavering or of his father Robert fitzRoger de Clavering of Warkworth Castle in Northumberland. By his wife he had fourteen children including:
  - Robert Neville (c. 1287 – June 1319), the "Peacock of the North", eldest son and heir apparent who predeceased his father, having been slain in a border fray outside the walls of Berwick by James 'The Good', Lord of Douglas (c.1290–1330). His cross-legged crusader-style effigy survives in St Brandon's Church, Brancepeth;
  - Ralph Neville, 2nd Baron Neville (c. 1291 – 5 August 1367), eldest surviving son and heir;
  - Sir Alexander Neville (d. 15 March 1367);
  - John Neville (d. 19 July 1333) who died at the Battle of Halidon Hill;
  - Thomas Neville (c. 1306 – before August 1361), Archdeacon of Durham and early patron of the hermit Richard Rolle;
  - Anastasia Neville (c. 1285), wife of Sir Walter Fauconberg (d. 24 June 1314) who died at the Battle of Bannockburn);
  - Mary Neville;
  - Ida Neville;
  - Eupheme Neville.
- Secondly he married Margery de Thwenge, daughter of John de Thwenge and Joan de Mauley. Her effigy survives in St Mary's Church, Staindrop.

== Death and burial ==
Ranulph died shortly after 18 April 1331 and was buried in the choir of Coverham Abbey, the patronage of which had been inherited from his mother.

== Footnotes ==
Peerage of England
New creation	Baron Neville; 1295–1331	Succeeded by Ralph Neville
