= Baron Neville =

Barony in the Peerage of England

Coat of arms of the Neville family

Baron Neville or Nevill was a title of nobility in England, relating to and held by the Neville family, a noble house in northern England. The Nevilles had their family seat at the manor of Raby (turned into Raby Castle in the 14th century) in County Durham, and so were called barons "Neville of Raby". The title was first held as a barony by tenure (the Nevilles being feudal barons of Raby), and was afterwards created twice (in 1295 and 1459) by writ of summons to parliament.

The Neville barony of Raby came to existence in the 13th century, by the marriage of Robert fitz Meldred, lord of Raby, to Isabel de Neville, the heiress of a family of Norman origin. Their son, Geoffrey fitz Robert, adopted his mother's surname 'Neville' and inherited from his father the feudal barony of Raby, becoming the first "Baron Neville of Raby".

The barony by writ was created when Geoffrey de Neville's great-grandson, Ranulph, the third baron, was summoned to parliament on 24 June 1295, whereby he is held to have become 'Lord Neville' (of Raby). It was created once again, on 20 November 1459, for John Neville, a younger scion of the family (he did not own Raby castle and so was simply called "Lord Neville"). His son Ralph later inherited the earldom of Westmorland together with the two previous creations of the barony. The titles remained merged until the attainder of Charles Neville, 6th Earl of Westmorland, in 1571, wherein the barony of Neville became extinct.

== Feudal barons of Raby (barony by tenure) ==
- Geoffrey fitz Robert de Neville, 1st Baron Neville of Raby (d.c. 1242)
- Robert de Neville, 2nd Baron Neville (d. 1282), son of preceding
- Ranulph Neville, 3rd Baron Neville (1262–1331), grandson of preceding – created Baron Neville by writ of summons to parliament

For further succession, see below

== Barons Neville of Raby (1295) ==
- Ranulph Neville, 1st (or 3rd) Baron Neville (1262–1331) – 3rd baron by tenure, 1st baron by writ
- Ralph Neville, 2nd (or 4th) Baron Neville (c. 1291–1367), son of preceding
- John Neville, 3rd (or 5th) Baron Neville (c. 1330–1388), son of preceding
- Ralph Neville, 4th (or 6th) Baron Neville, 1st Earl of Westmorland (c. 1364–1425), son of preceding

For further succession, see Earl of Westmorland

== Barons Neville (1459) ==
- John Neville, Baron Neville (c. 1410–1461) – attainted on 4 November 1461
- Ralph Neville, Baron Neville, 3rd Earl of Westmorland (c. 1456–1499), son of preceding – attainder reversed on 6 October 1472

For further succession, see Earl of Westmorland

== See also ==
- Baron Raby
- Nevill baronets
