= Listed buildings in Greystoke, Cumbria =

Greystoke is a civil parish in Westmorland and Furness, Cumbria, England. It contains 49 listed buildings that are recorded in the National Heritage List for England. Of these, one is listed at Grade I, the highest of the three grades, five are at Grade II*, the middle grade, and the others are at Grade II, the lowest grade. The parish contains the villages of Greystoke, Little Blencow, Johnby, and Motherby, and the surrounding countryside. Three of the listed buildings originated as fortified tower houses that were later converted into country houses. Most of the listed buildings are houses and associated structures, farmhouses and farm buildings. The other listed buildings include a church and items in the churchyard, a village cross, a public house, a school, a chapel, and a bridge.

== Key ==
Grade	Criteria
I	Buildings of exceptional interest, sometimes considered to be internationally important
II*	Particularly important buildings of more than special interest
II	Buildings of national importance and special interest

== Buildings ==
Name and location	Photograph	Date	Notes	Grade
St Andrew's Church; 54.66904°N 2.86457°W		Late 13th century	Originating as a collegiate church, it was extensively altered and extended in the 15th century, and restored in 1645, 1848, and in 1848–49, the last by Anthony Salvin. The church is in sandstone on a chamfered plinth, with string courses, a parapet, and angle buttresses with finials. The roof is in green slate with coped gables and cross finial. The church consists of a nave, aisles, a south porch, a south two-storey battlemented priest's chamber, a chancel, and a west tower. The tower has three stages, a doorway with a pointed arch, and a battlemented parapet.	II*
Johnby Hall; 54.68668°N 2.87903°W		1326	Originally a fortified tower house, later converted into a country house, the earliest part is the tower, and the body of the house was built in 1583. Alterations were made in 1747 to the front, and the parapets and turrets on the tower were replaced by a hipped roof. It is built in sandstone on a chamfered plinth, and has a hipped green slate roof. There are three storeys and four bays, the right bay being the projecting former tower. At the rear is a two-storey four-bay kitchen wing. The doorway has a stone architrave and a shaped hood that encloses a large inscribed panel. The windows are mullioned or mullioned and transomed.	II*
Blencow Hall Farmhouse and gatehouse wing 54.68547°N 2.85434°W		Late 15th century (probable)	A tower house that was altered and extended in 1590, and altered again in the 20th century, it is in sandstone with green slate roofs. The building consists of a two-storey four-bay hall, flanked by three-storey single-bay battlemented towers, and behind the left tower at right angles is a two-storey five-bay gatehouse wing. The right tower has thicker walls, and has a turret containing a staircase. Most of the windows are mullioned with hood moulds. The front wall of the left tower is split, and glazing has been inserted within the tower.	I
Greenthwaite Hall Farmhouse and Cottage; 54.66347°N 2.88290°W	—	Mid 16th century	The farmhouse was extended in 1650, and has since been divided into two dwellings. It is in sandstone with quoins, and has a green slate roof with coped gables. The house is in two storeys with three bays, there is a three-bay extension to the left, a central three-storey gabled porch, and a lower two-storey three-bay extension at right angles, forming an F-shaped plan. Most of the windows are mullioned and have hood moulds.	II*
Former chapel, Blencow Hall Farm; 54.68561°N 2.85470°W	—	Late 16th century (probable)	Originally a private chapel for the hall, later used as a barn. It is in sandstone with a green slate roof, and has one storey and one bay. There are small windows on the sides, and a two-light east window with a pointed arch.	II
Layton Manor House; 54.66792°N 2.87605°W	—	Late 16th century (probable)	The house is in sandstone with green slate roofs and is in two storeys. It was extended in the 19th century. The house has two bays, a right-angled extension of two bays, and a 19th-century extension of two bays, giving an L-shaped plan. The doorway has a chamfered surround, and above it is a re-used coat of arms. Most of the windows are mullioned with hood moulds. On the left side is a Tudor arched porch.	II
Johnby Hall Cottage; 54.68656°N 2.87848°W	—	Late 16th or early 17th century	A sandstone house that has a green slate roof with coped gables. There are two storeys and four bays. On the front are two doors with chamfered surrounds, and a blocked loft doorway. The windows are mullioned with chamfered surrounds and hood moulds.	II
Lattendales Farmhouse and barn 54.66845°N 2.87493°W	—	Early 17th century	The farmhouse and barn are in sandstone and have a green slate roof, coped on the right. The house has two storeys and two bays. The windows were originally mullioned, in the ground floor the mullions have been removed and they have hood moulds, and in the upper floor the windows are sashes. The barn to the left has two bays, and it has been partly converted for domestic use.	II
Mid Farmhouse and barns 54.69019°N 2.88235°W	—	Mid 17th century	The farmhouse and barns are in sandstone with green slate roofs, the barns being of a later date. The house has two storeys and three bays, to the right is a two-bay barn, and at right angles to the left is another barn, giving an L-shaped plan. The house has a doorway with a stone surround and mullioned windows, those in the ground floor having hood moulds. The right barn has a sliding door, casement windows, and ventilation slits. The left barn has been partly converted for domestic use, and has a projecting segmental-arched entrance with an inscribed and dated keystone.	II
Village cross 54.66979°N 2.86958°W		17th century (probable)	The cross is in sandstone and has an octagonal plinth of five steps, the lower three steps dating from the 19th century. On the plinth is a square base and a tampering chamfered shaft carrying a foliated cross head.	II
Stable block, Johnby Hall; 54.68621°N 2.87820°W	—	1675	The stable block was extended in the late 18th century for the 11th Duke of Norfolk, It is in sandstone with quoins and green slate roofs with coped gables. There are two storeys, the original part having one bay, and the extension four bays. The original part has a segmental-headed carriage entrance and another opening, both with chamfered surrounds, and the extension has a segmental-headed entrance, flat-headed doorways, and casement windows with round heads. Both parts have ventilation slits, and in the right gable are vents, some oval, and one heart-shaped.	II
Greystoke Castle; 54.66994°N 2.87688°W		c. 1675	Originally a fortified tower house, it was largely rebuilt as a country house following damage in the Civil War. Alterations were carried out in 1702, and a south wing was added in about 1789 by the 11th Duke of Norfolk. Further alterations were made by Anthony Salvin in 1837–45, and again in 1875–78 following a fire, and parts were dismantled during the 20th century. The house is built in sandstone with slate roofs. The left wing has two storeys and nine bays, there is an angled four-storey tower in the centre, and a right wing of one storey and many bays. Features include battlemented parapets with finials in the form of heraldic supporters, a central two-storey porch, and windows, most of which are mullioned or mullioned and transomed.	II*
Vine Villa, Inglenook Cottage and unnamed cottage 54.66953°N 2.87243°W	—	1680	A row of three houses, the left house being added in the 19th century. They are in mixed red sandstone and calciferous sandstone and have a green slate roof. Each house has two storeys and two bays. The windows in Vine Villa, on the right, are mullioned with chamfered surrounds. In Inglenook Cottage, the centre house, the windows are irregular with chamfered surrounds, and in the unnamed cottage they are sash windows with stone surrounds.	II
Midtown House, stables, byre and barn 54.64692°N 2.88862°W	—	1696	The farmhouse and adjoining outbuildings are in sandstone and have green slate roofs. The house has two storeys and three bays, to the right is a single-bay former stable, to the left is a single-bay byre, and further to the left is a higher barn at right angles. The house has a doorway with a stone surround and an initialled and dated lintel, and the windows are sashes. The outbuildings have various openings, some altered, including a loft doorway, and a projecting cart entrance on the barn.	II
Alms table 54.66886°N 2.86426°W	—	1710	The alms table is in the churchyard of St Andrew's Church. It is in Penrith sandstone and consists of a large flat stone on six chamfered legs, On the top is a square sundial with iron gnomons and iron pegs, and with Latin inscriptions.	II
5 Church Road; 54.66918°N 2.86851°W	—	Early 18th century	A sandstone house on a chamfered plinth, with quoins, a string course, an eaves cornice, and a green slate roof with coped gables and finials. There are two storeys and five bays. The central doorway has a bolection architrave and a segmental pediment, and the windows are mullioned with sashes in stone surrounds.	II
The Cottage and Rose Cottage; 54.68757°N 2.84874°W	—	Early 18th century	A pair of stone houses, partly roughcast, with a green slate roof. There are two storeys, The Cottage has three bays, and Rose Cottage has one. The Cottage has casement windows in chamfered surrounds, and Rose Cottage has sash windows. Both houses have plank doors.	II
Barn, Johnby Hall Farm; 54.68829°N 2.87965°W	—	1742	A sandstone barn with a green slate roof, it is a long building with two storeys. The barn contains a central cart entrance with a segmental head and a dated keystone, blocked doorways, a loft door, and ventilation slits.	II
Johnby Hall Farmhouse; 54.68828°N 2.87936°W	—	1747	The farmhouse is in mixed pink sandstone and calciferous sandstone with quoins, and it has a green slate roof with a sandstone ridge. There are two storeys and two bays. The windows are mullioned with a continuous hood mould above the ground floor. On the right side is a doorway with an alternate block surround and a fanlight.	II
Thorpe Farmhouse, Thorpe Farm Cottage and barn 54.67166°N 2.86622°W	—	Mid 18th century	The house was extended to the left in the late 18th century, this later becoming Thorpe Farm Cottage. Both houses have two storeys, three bays, sash windows, and, with the barn, a green slate roof. The house is in calciferous sandstone with quoins, a string course, and an eaves cornice. The central doorway has a bolection architrave and a pediment on console brackets. The cottage is in red sandstone, and the barn is in a mix of calciferous and red sandstone.	II
Nettle How; 54.64804°N 2.88622°W	—	1760	A sandstone house with quoins and a green slate roof. There are two storeys, three bays, and a lower single-bay right extension. The windows have chamfered surrounds, and in the main part is a continuous hood mould. In the extension is a doorway with a chamfered surround and an initialled and dated lintel.	II
Little Blencow Farmhouse and barn 54.68820°N 2.84661°W	—	1769	The farmhouse and barn are roughcast with a green slate roof. The house has two storeys and two bays. The doorway has a stone surround and a false dated keystone, and the windows are sashes in chamfered stone surrounds. The barn to the right has a plank door, a ventilation slit, and a lean-to projecting extension at the front.	II
Bushby House; 54.67004°N 2.86926°W	—	Late 18th century	A sandstone house with quoins, a string course, an eaves cornice, and a green slate roof with coped gables. There are two storeys and four bays, with rear extensions giving a U-shaped plan. The doorway has a pilastered surround and a fanlight. and the sash windows have raised stone surrounds.	II
The Garth; 54.67036°N 2.86957°W	—	Late 18th century	A sandstone house with rusticated angle pilasters and a green slate roof. There are two storeys, three bays, and a lower two-bay extension to the right. The doorway has a pilastered surround, a fanlight, and a pediment containing a coat of arms. The windows are casements in stone architraves.	II
Ghyll House; 54.65746°N 2.86077°W	—	Late 18th century	The farmhouse is in sandstone with quoins and a green slate roof. There are two storeys and two bays. On the front is a gabled porch, and the windows are sashes with sandstone surrounds.	II
Garden wall and gateways, Greystoke Castle; 54.67060°N 2.87782°W	—	Late 18th century	The garden wall is in sandstone, it is in varying heights, and has flat coping stones. At the north end is a pair of square rusticated gate piers, and at the south end is a Tudor gateway with an inscribed motto.	II
Johnby Bank and barn 54.68863°N 2.88049°W	—	Late 18th century	The farmhouse and barn are in sandstone with green slate roofs. The house has quoins, two storeys and two bays. The doorway and sash windows have stone surrounds. To the left is a lower two-bay barn that has a projecting cart entrance, a casement window, doorways, and ventilation slits.	II
Poplin Dub and barn 54.67330°N 2.87090°W	—	Late 18th century	The farmhouse and barn are in sandstone, the house is rendered, and both have green slate roofs. The house was extended in 1844, and has two storeys and three bays. The doorway and casement windows have sandstone surrounds, and at the rear is a stair extension and an outshut. The barn extends at an angle at the rear, and it contains a segmental-arched entrance, a smaller doorway, a casement window, and small square openings in the eaves.	II
Stafford House; 54.67142°N 2.87007°W	—	Late 18th century	The house was built by the 11th Duke of Norfolk for his head gardener. It is in sandstone with eaves modillions and battlemented parapets. On the front are two storeys and three bays. The central doorway has a pointed arch, The windows are sashes with pointed arches, false impost blocks, and keystones. At the rear are two round-headed doorways converted into windows, a casement window, and windows with pointed arches.	II
Watson Farmhouse; 54.65780°N 2.86216°W	—	Late 18th century	The farmhouse has a stuccoed front on a chamfered plinth, and a string course, quoins, an eaves cornice, and a green slate roof with coped gables. There are two storeys and two bays, flanked by lean-to wings. The windows on the left are round headed, and on the right they are Venetian windows. In each wing is a doorway that has an alternate block surround with a keyed lintel, above the door on the left side is a sash window, and on the right is a casement window. In the right return is a door with a segmental arch and alternate block surround, and casement windows. The interior is of high quality.	II*
Clock tower, Greystoke Castle; 54.67039°N 2.87741°W	—	1789	The tower was originally part of a wing of the house, but became detached when some of the house were demolished. It is in sandstone on a chamfered plinth, and has quoins, string courses, eaves modillions, and a battlemented parapet. The tower has four storeys and a heptagonal plan, and contains a doorway with a pointed arch, openings in various shapes, and two clock faces.	II
War Memorial Bridge; 54.66903°N 2.86598°W	—	1796	The bridge carries Church Road over the North Petteril. It is in sandstone, and consists of a single segmental arch, splayed at the ends, and with a solid parapet. It carries a brass plate inscribed with the details that it was widened in 1920 as a tribute to those who were lost in the First World War.	II
1 and 2 The Hill, Boot and Shoe Inn and stables 54.66934°N 2.86968°W		Late 18th or early 19th century	Two houses, a public house and stables, forming a row. They are in sandstone, the public house and stables are rendered, the roof is in green slate, and they all have two storeys. The houses have one bay each, and the public house has three. In the stables are plank doors, a loft doorway, a segmental-headed archway, and casement windows. The other windows are sashes.	II
Crossways; 54.66905°N 2.86912°W	—	Late 18th or early 19th century	A stuccoed house on a chamfered plinth, with quoins and a green slate roof. There are two storeys, two bays, The doorway and sash windows have stone surrounds.	II
Wall and gates, The Garth; 54.67019°N 2.86949°W	—	Late 18th or early 19th century	The low wall encloses the garden, and is in sandstone with moulded coping. The wall contains two square low gate piers with shaped caps.	II
Stable block, Greystoke Castle; 54.67138°N 2.87782°W	—	Early 19th century	The stable block is in sandstone with quoins, a string course, and eaves modillions. It has a hipped green slate roof, with a catslide roof at the rear in Welsh slate. There are two storeys, a central block of five bays, with flanking two-bay wings, the left having a return of three bays, and the right of five bays, forming an approximate H-shaped plan. The doorways and windows are in Tudor style.	II
Lattendales and stables 54.66895°N 2.87425°W	—	Early 19th century	The house and stables were later used as a Quaker guest house. The building is in mixed pink sandstone and calciferous sandstone on a chamfered plinth, and has quoins and green slate roofs. The house has two storeys and five bays, there is a taller projecting gabled two-bay section, with one bay to the left and two to the right. In the right section is a doorway with a pilastered surround, a fanlight, and a pediment. The windows are sashes in stone surrounds.	II
Motherby House, barn and stables 54.64818°N 2.88517°W	—	Early 19th century	The house and attached outbuildings are in sandstone with quoins and green slate roofs. The house has two storeys and three bays, with a lower two-bay extension to the rear. The doorway has a pilastered surround, a fanlight, and a cornice, and the windows are sashes on stone surrounds. The barn and stables to the left are lower and have a door and ventilation slits in the front wall, most of the openings being at the rear.	II
Rose Bank; 54.69103°N 2.88547°W	—	Early 19th century	The house is built in mixed cobbles and sandstone, with quoins and a green slate roof. There are two storeys and two bays. The doorway and sash windows have stone surrounds.	II
The Old Rectory; 54.67035°N 2.86344°W	—	Early 19th century	The rectory, later a private house, was extended in the middle of the 19th century. It is in sandstone with angle pilasters. and has a hipped green slate roof. There are two storeys, a main block of six bays, a rear extension of two storeys and four bays, and a further single-storey extension. The central two bays on the front project under a pediment, and there is a Tuscan prostyle porch. The windows are sashes in stone surrounds, and there is a round-headed stair window.	II
Church View; 54.66922°N 2.86950°W	—	1832	A house in pink sandstone and calciferous sandstone with quoins and a green slate roof. There are two storeys and two bays. The doorway has a quoined surround and a keyed lintel, and the sash windows have stone surrounds.	II
Implement store and workshop, Home Farm; 54.67224°N 2.87976°W	—	1835	A sandstone building with quoins and a green slate roof. There are two storeys and two bays, with a lower single-bay extension on the right. It contains double doors with a segmental arch and casement windows, all with raised stone surrounds.	II
Byres and barn, Home Farm; 54.67198°N 2.87916°W	—	1836	The byres and barn are in sandstone on a chamfered plinth, with quoins and an eaves cornice. The barn has a roof of green slate, and the byres have roofs of corrugated iron. The barn has two storeys and seven bays. In the centre of the barn is a central gabled projection and a segmental archway, and flanking it are doorways with segmental heads, casement windows, and loft doors. The byres are in ranges to the rear, forming a U-shaped plan, and contain various openings.	II
Home Farmhouse; 54.67211°N 2.87974°W	—	1837	A sandstone farmhouse with quoins, and a green slate roof with coped gables. There are two storeys, three bays, and sash windows in stone surrounds. On the right side is a rusticated gabled porch and a doorway with a keyed lintel.	II
Greystoke Primary School; 54.66905°N 2.86952°W	—	1838	The Gothic-style school is in mixed pink sandstone and calciferous sandstone with quoins, and has a green slate roof with coped gables. There are two storeys and three bays, with a single-storey three-bay extension to the left. The door has a Tudor arched surround, and the windows are cross-mullioned. On the right gable is an open bellcote.	II
Gate piers and garden wall, Greystoke Castle; 54.67026°N 2.87606°W	—	1838–46	The garden wall and the gate piers are in sandstone. The wall forms a U-shaped plan, and has moulded coping. The gate piers flank the drive to the house, they are square, and carry supporters and coats-of-arms. The gate is wooden and has palings incorporating a coat-of-arms.	II
South Lodge and gateway, Greystoke Castle; 54.67009°N 2.87005°W	—	1846	The lodge and gateway are in sandstone. The lodge has a green slate roof with coped gables, one storey and two bays. There is a doorway with a Tudor arched head, mullioned windows, and an angled bay window. The gateway has a segmental arch containing a coat of arms and has a stepped battlemented parapet. To the left is a smaller pedestrian entrance.	II
Blencow Methodist Chapel; 54.68691°N 2.84895°W		1877	The chapel is in sandstone on a chamfered plinth, and has a green slate roof with coped gables and a finial. There is one storey, two bays, and a lean-to porch. The windows have two lights and elliptical arches.	II
Post Office and Nos. 1-4 Church Road; 54.66921°N 2.86877°W		1887–93	The Post Office and four houses form a terrace. They are in sandstone and have a green slate roof with a coped gable on the left. The houses have two storeys and two bays each. The doorways have chamfered surrounds, and the windows are sashes. The Post Office in the left return wall has a door and a shop window in the ground floor and a two-light window in the upper floor, all with hood moulds. The corner is chamfered and contains a letter box.	II

== Notes and references ==
=== Sources ===
- Historic England, "Church of St Andrew, Greystoke (1210233)", National Heritage List for England
- Historic England, "Johnby Hall, Greystoke (1326690)", National Heritage List for England
- Historic England, "Blencow Hall Farmhouse and gatehouse wing, Greystoke (1145492)", National Heritage List for England
- Historic England, "Greenthwaite Hall Farmhouse and Greenthwaite Hall Cottage, Greystoke (1145515)", National Heritage List for England
- Historic England, "Chapel, now barn, north-west of Blencow Hall Farmhouse, Greystoke (1290482)", National Heritage List for England
- Historic England, "Layton Manor House, Greystoke (1145516)", National Heritage List for England
- Historic England, "Johnby Hall Cottage, Greystoke (1145489)", National Heritage List for England
- Historic England, "Lattendales Farmhouse and barn adjoining, Greystoke (1210219)", National Heritage List for England
- Historic England, "Mid Farmhouse and barns adjoining, Greystoke (1210345)", National Heritage List for England
- Historic England, "Village Cross, Greystoke (1326705)", National Heritage List for England
- Historic England, "Stable block south-east of Johnby Hall, Greystoke (1145490)", National Heritage List for England
- Historic England, "Greystoke Castle, Greystoke (1290545)", National Heritage List for England
- Historic England, "Vine Villa, Inglenook Cottage and unnamed cottage adjoining to west of Inglenook Cottage, Greystoke (1210183)", National Heritage List for England
- Historic England, "Midtown House with former stables, byre and barn adjoining, Greystoke (1210430)", National Heritage List for England
- Historic England, "Alms table south of Church of St Andrew, Greystoke (1145519)", National Heritage List for England
- Historic England, "No. 5 Church Road, Greystoke (1326704)", National Heritage List for England
- Historic England, "The Cottage and Rose Cottage, Greystoke (1210421)", National Heritage List for England
- Historic England, "Barn west of Johnby Hall Farmhouse, Greystoke (1210408)", National Heritage List for England
- Historic England, "Johnby Hall Farmhouse, Greystoke (1145491)", National Heritage List for England
- Historic England, "Thorpe Farmhouse, Thorpe Farm Cottage and barn adjoining, Greystoke (1326706)", National Heritage List for England
- Historic England, "Nettle How, Greystoke (1145495)", National Heritage List for England
- Historic England, "Little Blencow Farmhouse and barn adjoining, Greystoke (1145494)", National Heritage List for England
- Historic England, "Bushby House, Greystoke (1210261)", National Heritage List for England
- Historic England, "The Garth, Greystoke (1326688)", National Heritage List for England
- Historic England, "Ghyll House, Greystoke (1145522)", National Heritage List for England
- Historic England, "Garden wall and gateways north-west of Greystoke Castle, Greystoke (1145523)", National Heritage List for England
- Historic England, "Johnby Bank and barn adjoining, Greystoke (1210406)", National Heritage List for England
- Historic England, "Poplin Dub and barn adjoining, Greystoke (1145521)", National Heritage List for England
- Historic England, "Stafford House, Greystoke (1145486)", National Heritage List for England
- Historic England, "Watson Farmhouse, Greystoke (1210286)", National Heritage List for England
- Historic England, "Clock Tower north-west of Greystoke Castle, Greystoke (1326707)", National Heritage List for England
- Historic England, "War Memorial Bridge, Greystoke (1145518)", National Heritage List for England
- Historic England, "Boot and Shoe Inn, former stables and The Hill (Nos. 1 and 2), Greystoke (1145520)", National Heritage List for England
- Historic England, "Crossways, Greystoke (1290557)", National Heritage List for England
- Historic England, "Garden wall and gateway in front of The Garth, Greystoke (1145487)", National Heritage List for England
- Historic England, "Stable Block north of Greystoke Castle, Greystoke (1319050)", National Heritage List for England
- Historic England, "Lattendales and stables adjoining, Greystoke (1145517)", National Heritage List for England
- Historic England, "Motherby House and barn/stables adjoining, Greystoke (1210445)", National Heritage List for England
- Historic England, "Rose Bank, Greystoke (1326691)", National Heritage List for England
- Historic England, "The Old Rectory, Greystoke (1210275)", National Heritage List for England
- Historic England, "Church View, Greystoke (1210268)", National Heritage List for England
- Historic England, "Implement store/workshop north-west of Home Farmhouse, Greystoke (1145524)", National Heritage List for England
- Historic England, "Byres and barn south-east of Home Farmhouse, Greystoke (1145485)", National Heritage List for England
- Historic England, "Home Farmhouse, Greystoke (1210337)", National Heritage List for England
- Historic England, "Greystoke Primary School, Greystoke (1145488)", National Heritage List for England
- Historic England, "Gate piers and garden wall north-east of Greystoke Castle, Greystoke (1210332)", National Heritage List for England
- Historic England, "South Lodge and gateway adjoining, east of Greystoke Castle, Greystoke (1326689)", National Heritage List for England
- Historic England, "Blencow Methodist Chapel, Greystoke (1145493)", National Heritage List for England
- Historic England, "Post office and Nos. 1-4 Church Road, Greystoke (1210227)", National Heritage List for England
- Historic England, Listed Buildings
- Hyde, Matthew; Pevsner, Nikolaus (2010) [1967], Cumbria, The Buildings of England, New Haven and London: Yale University Press, ISBN 978-0-300-12663-1
