= John Neville, 3rd Baron Neville =

English peer (c.1337 – 1388)

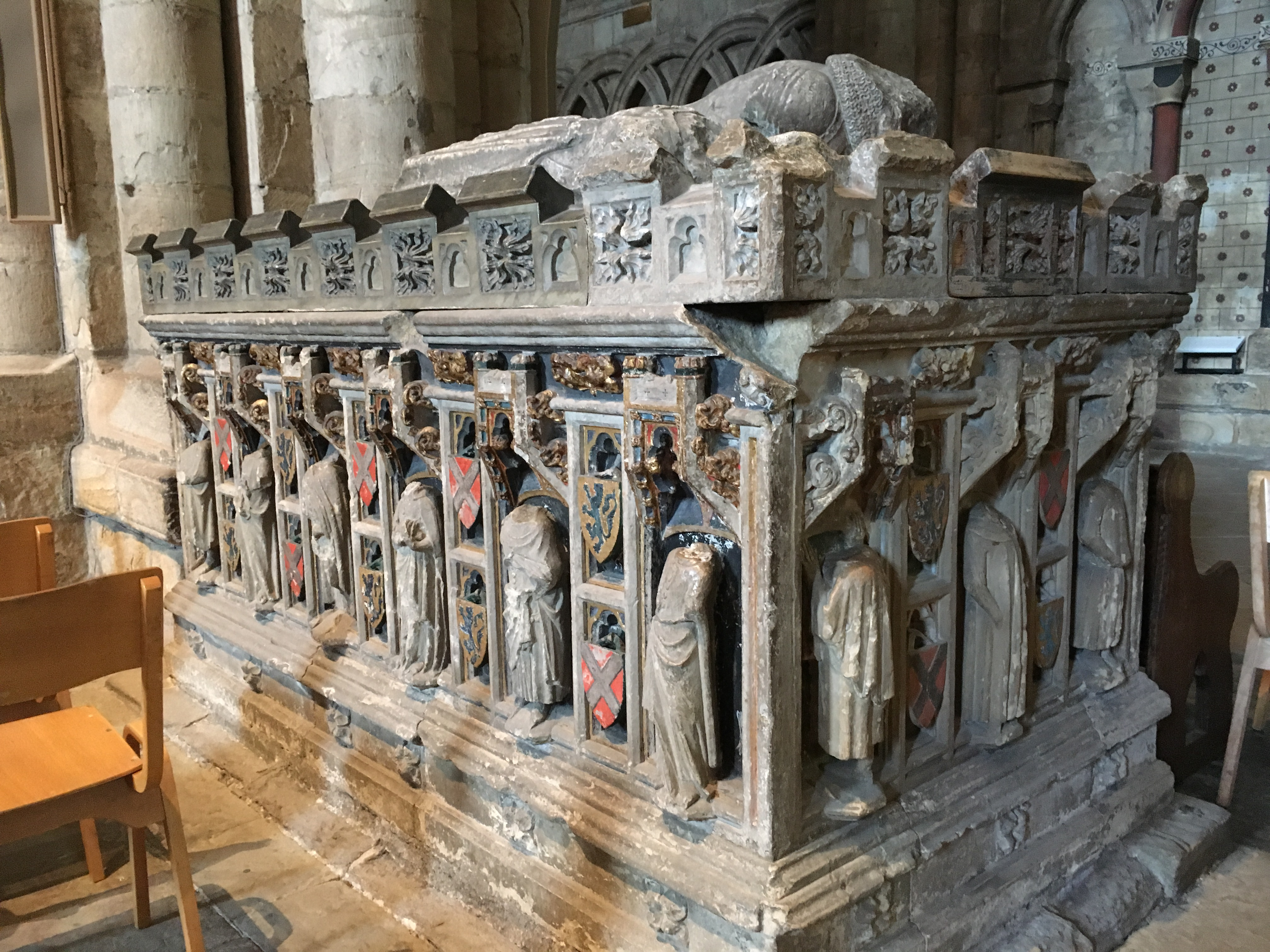
- The vandalised and partially reconstructed tomb of John Neville and his first wife, Maud, between two pillars in the nave of Durham Cathedral, in the former Neville Chantry
- Born: c. 1337; County Durham
- Died: 17 October 1388; Newcastle upon Tyne
- Noble family: Neville
- Spouses: Maud Percy; Elizabeth Latimer
- Issue: Ralph Neville, 1st Earl of Westmorland; Alice Neville; Maud Neville; Idoine Neville; Eleanor Neville; Elizabeth Neville; John Neville, 6th Baron Latimer; Elizabeth Neville
- Father: Ralph Neville, 2nd Baron Neville
- Mother: Alice Audley

John Neville, 3rd Baron Neville, KG (c. 1337 – 17 October 1388) was an English peer, naval commander, and soldier. (Note: The Oxford Dictionary of National Biography uses a different numbering system and numbers him the 5th Baron Neville and his father the 4th, etc.(Tuck 2008)) His second wife was Elizabeth Latimer (later Elizabeth Willoughby) who was the 5th Baroness Latimer in her own right.

== Origins ==
He was born between 1337 and 1340 at Raby Castle, County Durham, the eldest son of Ralph Neville, 2nd Baron Neville de Raby by his wife Alice Audley, a daughter of Hugh de Audley of Stratton Audley in Oxfordshire and sister of Hugh de Audley, 1st Earl of Gloucester, 1st Baron Audley (c. 1291 – 1347) of Stratton Audley. He had five brothers, including Alexander Neville, Archbishop of York, and four sisters.

== Career ==
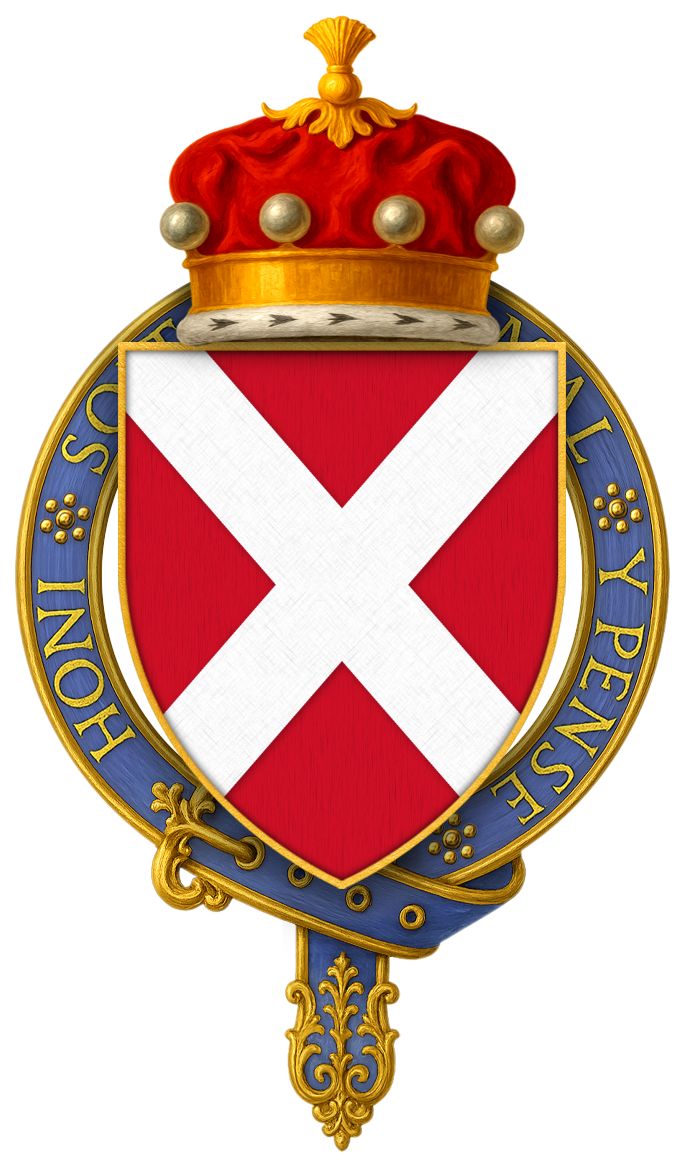
Arms of Sir John Neville, 3rd Baron Neville de Raby, KG

Cokayne notes that Neville's public career was as active as his father's had been. He fought against the Scots at the Battle of Neville's Cross on 17 October 1346 as a captain under his father, was knighted about 1360 after a skirmish near Paris while serving under Sir Walter Manny, and fought in Aquitaine in 1366, and again in 1373–4.

At his father's death on 5 August 1367, he succeeded to the title, and had livery of his lands in England and Scotland in October of that year.

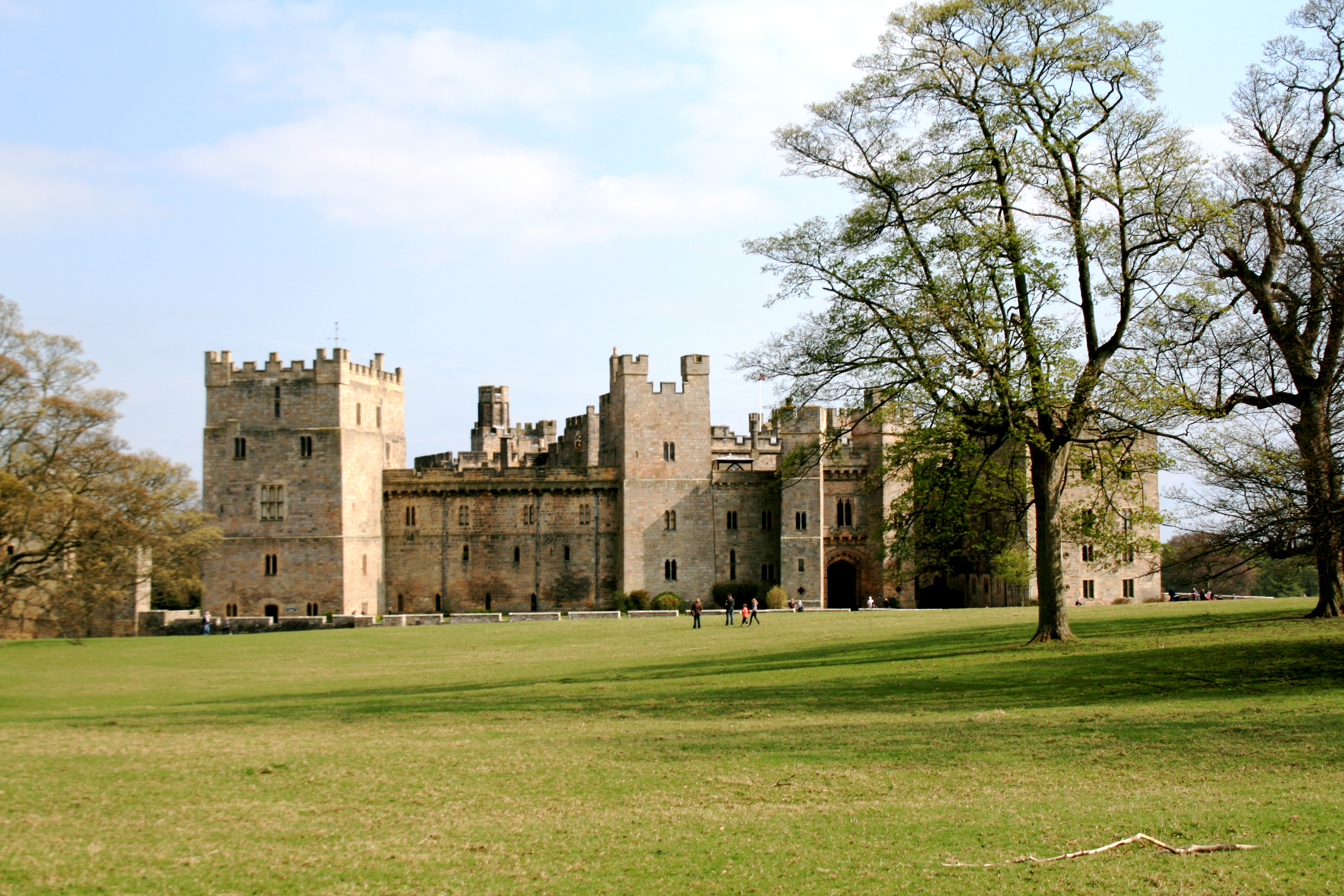
Raby Castle, seat of the Neville family

From 1367, on he had numerous commissions issued to him, and in 1368 served as joint ambassador to France. He was made a Knight of the Garter in 1369. In July 1370, he was appointed Admiral of the North, and in November of that year a joint commissioner to treat with Genoa. He was Steward of the King's Household in 1372, and in July of that year was part of an expedition to Brittany. For the next several years he served in Scotland and the Scottish Marches. In 1378 he had licence to fortify Raby Castle, and in June of the same year was in Gascony, where he was appointed Keeper of Fronsac Castle and Lieutenant of Gascony. He spent several years in Gascony, and was among the forces which raised the siege of Mortaigne in 1381. On his return to England, he was again appointed Warden of the Marches. In May 1383 and March 1387, he was a joint commissioner to treat of peace with Scotland, and in July 1385 was to accompany the king to Scotland.

Neville died at Newcastle upon Tyne on 17 October 1388. In his will he requested burial in Durham Cathedral by his first wife, Maud. He was succeeded by his eldest son, Ralph Neville, 1st Earl of Westmorland.

== Marriages and issue ==
Neville married twice:

Arms of Percy: Or, a lion rampant azure

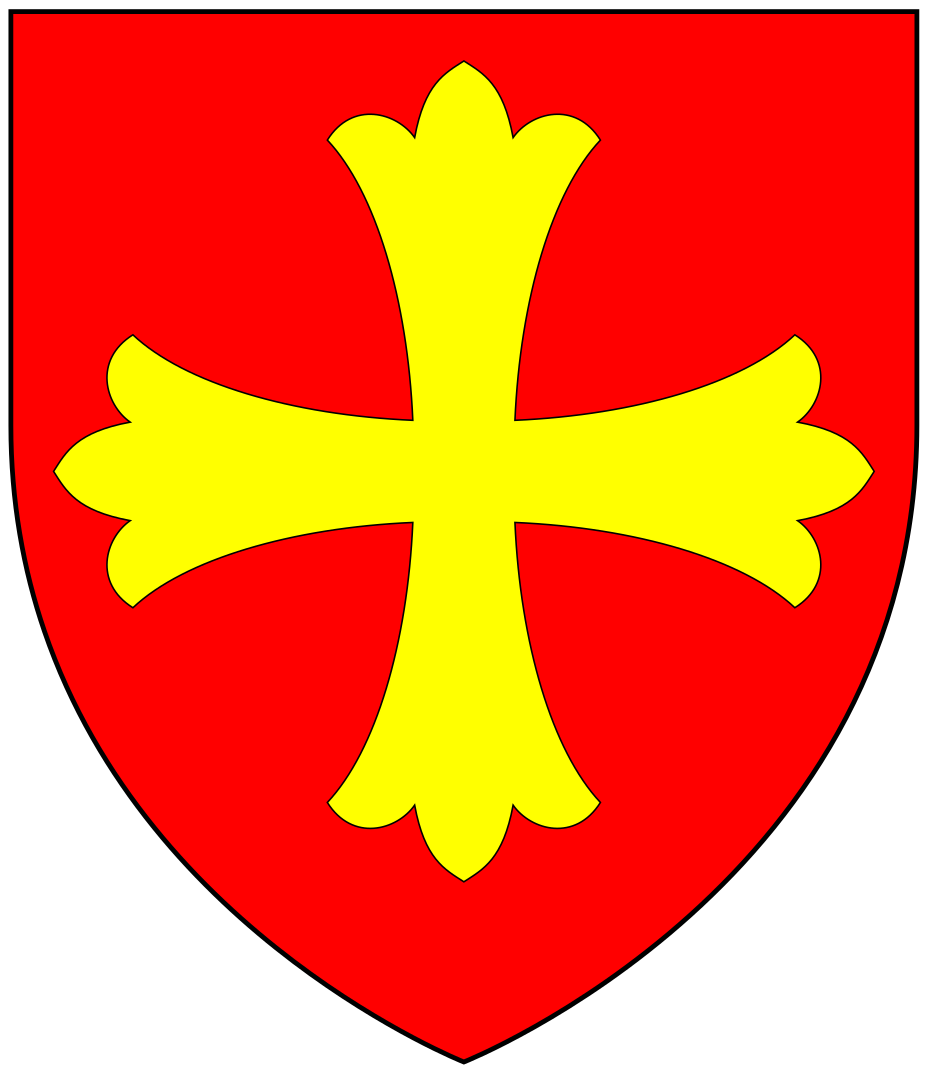
Arms of Latimer: Gules, a cross patonce or

Firstly, before 1362, to Maud Percy (d. before 18 February 1379), a daughter of Henry de Percy, 2nd Baron Percy of Alnwick, Northumberland, by his wife Idoine de Clifford, a daughter of Robert de Clifford, 1st Baron de Clifford. By Maud he had two sons and five daughters:

- Ralph Neville, 1st Earl of Westmorland (c. 1364 – 1425), eldest son and heir
- Thomas Neville, 5th Baron Furnivall, who married Joan Furnival
- Alice Neville, who married William Deincourt, 3rd Baron Deincourt
- Maud Nevile
- Idoine Neville
- Eleanor Neville, who married Ralph de Lumley, 1st Baron Lumley
- Elizabeth Neville, a nun.

Secondly, before 9 October 1381, he married Elizabeth Latimer (d. 5 November 1395), daughter and heiress of William Latimer, 4th Baron Latimer, who survived him and became the 5th Baroness Latimer in her own right. She remarried (as his second wife) to Robert Willoughby, 4th Baron Willoughby de Eresby (c. 1348/50 – 9 August 1396), by whom she had a daughter, Margaret Willoughby. Neville had by Elizabeth Latimer a further son and a daughter:

- John Neville, 6th Baron Latimer (c. 1382 – 10 December 1430), who married Maud Clifford (c. 26 August 1446), daughter of Thomas de Clifford, 6th Baron de Clifford, whom he divorced before 1413/17, and by whom he had no issue. She married, secondly, Richard of Conisburgh, 3rd Earl of Cambridge.
- Elizabeth Neville, who before 27 May 1396 married Sir Thomas Willoughby (died shortly before 20 August 1417) son of Robert Willoughby, 4th Baron Willoughby de Eresby (c. 1348/50 – 9 August 1396), by whom she had one child, Sir John Willoughby (c. 1400 – 24 February 1437).

== See also ==
- Baron Percy

== Notes ==
Peerage of England
Preceded by Ralph Neville	Baron Neville de Raby; 1367–1388	Succeeded by Ralph Neville
