= Robert de Neville =

English nobleman

The Neville coat of arms

Robert de Neville, 2nd Baron Neville of Raby (c. 1223–1282), was a medieval English nobleman.

== Background ==
The Neville family in England go back to at least the 11th century, and the historian Horace Round speculated that they were part of the pre-Norman aristocracy of Northumbria. By the 13th century, the Nevilles had become, through shrewd marriages and royal patronage, major landholders, and concomitantly rose to a position of regional hegemony regularly being appointed to the important royal offices. By the time Neville reached adulthood, and for the rest of his life, English politics was in a state of partisanship; the King, Henry III was increasingly unpopular with his nobility and the tension between them, never resolved, erupted in constitutional crisis and eventually civil war. Simon de Montfort, previously a favourite of Henry's, who had married his sister Eleanor, led the opposition.

== Early life ==
Robert de Neville was the eldest son of Geoffrey fitz Robert (later Geoffrey de Neville, d. c. 1242), and the grandson of Robert fitz Maldred, Lord of Raby. The identity of Robert de Neville's mother is believed to be Joan Plantagenet, daughter of John I of England, and there is evidence from a Lincolnshire fine of 1247 which refers to one Robert de Neville, knight, and his mother, Joan. (Note: The historian Charles Robert Young explains that his brother Geoffrey married Margaret de Longvilliers.) Robert had younger brothers, Geoffrey—who was to start a cadet branch of the family in Hornby, Lancashire—John, and Hugh.

=== Inheritance and estates ===
Robert possessed estates in Burreth, Lincolnshire by 1242 and on his father's death in 1254 he succeeded to his patrimony, including the Lordship of Raby and Brancepeth in Durham; he performed fealty to the king on 7 May that year following the deaths of his grandmother and grandfather, from whom he received further lands. They probably included the manors of Ulnaby and Carlbury. However, notes Young, the nature of the surviving evidence—mostly existing in the form of the inquisition post mortem taken after his death—is not sufficient for scholars to make anything other than "an approximate estimate of their wealth". (Note: Specifically, the IPMs list de Neville as holding Schyrrevehoton (Sheriff Hutton) in Yorkshire.) The medievalist Matthew Holford described de Neville as having "united the inheritances of Bulmer and Meldred".

== Northern and national politics ==
De Neville became increasingly important in the politics and society of northeastern England during the mid-1250s, and by 1258 he had been appointed Sheriff of Northumberland. The strategic proximity of Northumberland to the border with Scotland made this an important post for pushing the boundaries of English influence into Scottish affairs, (Note: This was also a particularly crucial time for intervening in Scottish domestic politics, as the Scottish King, Alexander III, was still a minor; King Henry also had a personal interest, as Alexander's queen was Henry's daughter Margaret, and de Neville was under instruction to visit her as often as was feasible.) as well as escorting and receiving embassies; accompanied by William de Latimer, then Sheriff of York, he travelled to Scotland on royal business in April 1258 with orders to assist the Scottish king in crushing a revolt by his own nobles. De Neville attended a large assembly in York between the 7th and 26 September 1268 with the King. This was the official setting for a meeting between Henry III and his son-in-law, the King of Scotland; with the latter came Henry's daughter, Margaret, Queen of Scotland. During this meeting, de Neville witnessed a large number of both royal and private charters. (Note: Other members of the assembly, says J. R. Maddicott, included the Walter, Archbishop of York, his brother Godfrey, Bishop-elect of Worcester, the prior of the Hospitallers, the Lord Edward, his brother Edmund, their cousin Henry of Almain, Roger de Clifford, Hamo le Strange, Roger Leybum, Thomas de Clare, John de Vesci, Adam of Jesmond, Robert Brus and Guichard Charrun; and most of them, he notes, "were either Northerners or Marcher followers of Edward.") De Neville played a leading role in the administration of border society, including the organisation of truces, resolution of disputes and collecting protection money. He was also close to the Bishops of Duham, Robert and Antony, for whom de Neville witnessed many charters over the years, and with whose steward, Guichard de Charron, de Neville was an itinerant justice in 1278–1279, although this was the only time he held the office. (Note: It on account of this that Holford has concluded that it was personal connection with the bishops that determined one's appointment to the Palatinate's officers rather than simply landed status.)

In 1263, de Neville was entrusted with the defence of York and all of England north of the River Trent, as well as being appointed Sheriff of Yorkshire. and was also appointed governor of Norham and Werk castles, which had previously been held by Robert de Ros and the Bishops of Durham respectively.

=== Royal service ===
Even before his father's death, Robert was performing minor services for King Henry III in the North of England; in 1251, for example, he was dispatched to gather buck deer from the royal forest of Galtres for Henry's Christmas feast at Westminster Palace. (Note: Accompanying de Neville were his brothers Geoffrey and Hugh, and John d'Eyvill.) In return, the following year de Neville was granted the right to enclose land for his own harvesting at nearby Sutton in Galtres. This was followed by further grants over the next few years, which included deer for his park and a license to hunt hares, foxes and cats with his dogs. In August 1257 he fought on campaign in Wales. At various points in his career de Neville was custodian of royal castles in the north, including Bamburgh, Newcastle, Scarborough and York; de Neville calculated that the constableship of Bamburgh cost him 1,200 marks alone, although the historian Charles Young calls this figure "somewhat inflated". (Note: A medieval English mark was an accounting unit equivalent to two-thirds of a pound.) De Neville's primary use to the King at this time was diplomatic, however, rather than military. With conflict looming, as constable of York and Bamburgh Castles, de Neville promised to "surrender it to the king and his heirs and to no other, and this by the council of the king and not otherwise". In 1261 de Neville was appointed Chief Justice of forests beyond the Trent, with responsibility for hearing forest pleas replacing John d'Eyvill. (Note: Forest pleas were the legal records of cases that took place in royal forests and were heard in the itinerant Forest Eyre courts. These were, explains the medievalist Sean Lawing, "cases involving infractions detected by various royal functionaries within the king's numerous and expansive royal forests. Clearing land, taking wood, allowing one's livestock to browse, and especially hunting game were subject to regulation and punishment".)

=== Civil War ===
With the decline in relations between King Henry and a number of his barons, led by Simon de Montfort, de Neville's role was to become a military one.

De Neville, as constable of Bamburgh Castle, is mentioned "incidentally" on the rebel barons' Provisions of Oxford, which they promulgated in 1258, as an acceptable royalist whom they could trust with custody of royal castles; (Note: There were eighteen other such castellans, also presumably trusted by the reformists.) the rebels also appointed him Sheriff of Northumberland, where they were strongest in the north. In 1263—at the time, constable of Devizes Castle—de Neville was part of the group of barons sympathetic to the King in his struggle with Simon de Montfort, Earl of Leicester over political reform. Neville sought the intervention of King Louis IX of France to arbitrate in December 1263. The first violence took place in June 1263 when de Montfort and his men led a chevauchée through the lands of the King's favourites, collectively nicknamed the Savoyards on account of where they had come from. King Henry—"belatedly", comments the historian Fergus Oakes—organised his military response, making de Neville responsible for the royal lands in Yorkshire, Lincolnshire and Durham, whom Young notes had "remained a King's man". He was personally instructed to deal vigorously with those who "devastate the lands of the king's faithful men by fire, plunder and other means". Oakes calls de Neville's prospects of doing so "daunting", not least on account of the sheer extent of the region he was now responsible for—around one-third of the Kingdom. This led to de Neville writing to the Chancellor, William of Merton, protesting that his task "not possible without great expense" and that he had "been led...to beg your counsel and help...in order to signify to me where and from whence...I shall be able to acquire the money for the custody of the aforementioned county and castle of York". De Neville also wrote to King Henry personally, complaining that "many I meet with are tepid in their responses to the conservation of the peace of your majesty's dignity", and he implored Henry to send his nobility "in these parts your letters...that they may be appointed to aid my person...to resist the evils of the before said rebels".

The civil war had impacted substantially upon de Neville's ability to perform his royal duties, he claimed in 1269, and he had been unable to regularly collect—and so could not be held responsible for —the royal farm thanks to the criminal activities of John d'Eyville. D'Eyville, a firm and energetic supporter of de Montfort, with other barons, had severely disrupted local society, said de Neville, from Michaelmas 1263 until the Battle of Lewes on 14 May 1264, after which de Montfort appointed another person sheriff. (Note: The historian Oscar De Ville has called this period one of "largely unco-ordinated local dissent", in which d'Eyville was an (unofficial but de facto custodian of Yorkshire for the baronial rebels, invading York on one occasion and besieging Carlisle Castle on another.) Following de Montfort's victory at Lewes, de Neville was summoned to meet in London with the earl on 3 June 1264 to provide the new regime with counsel; he was back in London the next month, having been summoned with a force of men to repel an expected French invasion which did not, in the event, occur. King Henry had been captured at Lewes, and was now effectively a puppet King for de Montfort, but de Neville appears to have remained openly defiant to de Montfort's rule and refused to surrender Bamburgh or York Castles to the new regime, reflecting his earlier promise to the crown. De Neville's position, says Young, "is especially noteworthy in that other barons in the north, including John d'Eyvill, who had preceded Robert as Chief Justice of the Forest and had been associated with him in other royal service, now gave their allegiance to the Montfort government". This period has been described as "excessively demanding" for de Neville, who was repeatedly threatened with the confiscation of his estates if he did not surrender the castles. (Note: Bamburgh was especially significant, says Young, because de Montfort had previously promised it to the Lord Edward as an encouragement for the King's son to cooperate with the new regime.) The historian Helen M. Jewell has noted that on top having to support the King during the civil war, de Neville also had to carry out his usual military and official duties, such as the Welsh campaigns of the 1250s and 1260s (which resulted in the Treaty of Montgomery in 1267 and attendance at parliament in 1265.

Young suggests that de Neville was tangentially the cause of de Montfort's eventual defeat at the Battle of Evesham on 4 August 1265 through what Young describes as a chain reaction. The Earl of Gloucester was standing surety for de Neville's good behaviour, and the new government tried to force him to bring de Neville to London; de Clare not only refused, but proceeded to change sides. Gloucester's support was essential to Edward's later victory at Evesham as a result.

=== Later career ===
With Geoffrey and Robert, the Neville tradition of royal service simply continued throughout the war and into the new reign. Hugh and John were pardoned for their parts in the rebellion...family ties and a tradition of royal service helped to restore unity among the Nevilles.

— Charles R, Young, The Making of the Neville Family 1166–1400

Although de Montfort had been defeated and killed at Evesham, and Henry restored to independent rule, a groundswell of support for him and his reform movement remained; much of both the crown's and de Neville's energies over the following few years was devoted to neutralising it. He was reappointed Chief Justice of the Northern Forests (Note: His brother Geoffrey was appointed to the office in 1270 and held it until his death in 1285.) and also made a Keeper of the peace for Cumberland, Lancashire, Northumberland, Westmorland and Yorkshire. He was also appointed to repeated judicial commissions, and in 1276—having pledged his homage to the new kIng, Henry's son Edward I—de Neville was commissioned to hear the pleas of the so-called "Disinherited" rebels with Henry de Bratton. They included de Neville's cousin, Hugh de Neville, who had fought with de Montfort at Lewes, where he commanded a troop. De Neville has been described as a "staunch royalist" during the civil war, and Cokayne says de Neville "stood firmly" with the royal party. However, Jewell notes that, in 1267, he was required to meet with the King at Kenilworth Castle and there make his peace. This act that, she says, "jars" with his presumed loyalism. Kenilworth—de Montfort's chief residence until his death, and now holding out against the King—was almost impregnable, being surrounded by a river and a moat, and de Neville assisted the King's efforts in dislodging the remaining rebels. In what Young has called de Neville's final service for the King against the rebellion, on 17 September 1267, he was appointed an executor of the Dictum of Kenilworth in the East Midlands and the Thames Valley, which officially made the final peace between the crown and the last of de Montfort's followers. (Note: Specifically, Bedford, Berkshire, Buckingham, Leicester, Lincoln, Northampton, Oxford, Rutland and Warwick.) One of his roles involved witnessing the charters of mortgage that the rebels made in order to receive back their lands. (Note: This was because the Dictum of Kenilworth dictated that the rebel barons' estates—which had been confiscated during the war and mostly redistributed among the King's followers—could be repurchased by them on payment of five years' rents. This large sum, then, could only be attained by mortgaging them.)

De Neville continued to perform administrative duties, however, sitting on various commissions of Oyer and terminer and responsible for the collection of the fifteenth and tenth tax in Northumberland and Westmorland in 1275. The following year he was at the Council of Westminster as a member of the Royal council that declared Llywelyn ap Gruffudd a rebel, (Note: At which he was described as a "faithful servant of the King".) leading to the invasion of Wales the following year. The same council also heard Gilbert, Earl of Gloucester's claim to Bristol Castle, traditionally claimed by the de Clares but held by the crown, and dismissed it for good.

== Illness and death ==
The invasion of Wales continued into 1277, and de Neville was summoned to join the King's army. However, de Neville sent the King his son John to fight in his place. Summoned again the following year, he claimed exception on account of physical infirmity; he was dead by 20 August 1282. It is not known where he was buried, although Jewell notes that both Greyfriars and Blackfriars in York, and Staindrop Church have all been suggested as likely sites. His will was executed by his brother, Geoffrey; by the time of his death he was the most powerful noble in Durham.

== Marriage and family ==
Robert de Neville is known to have married twice. His first marriage, to Isabel de Byron, took an active part in her husband's legal affairs and provided him with children, all sons, although his heir, also a Robert, predeceased his father in 1271. Robert the younger's son, Ralph, thus inherited his grandfather's titles and lands, and was elevated to the peerage as the first Baron Neville. Robert the younger had married Mary fitz Ranulf (or Fitzrandolph), who inherited Middleham Castle from her father and so brought it to the Neville family. Robert the elder's second wife was Ida, widow of Sir Roger Bertram of Mitford. She remarried in 1285 to John FitzMarmaduke.

== Notes ==
Preceded by Geoffrey FitzRobert	Feudal baron of Raby; 1249–1282	Succeeded by Ralph Neville
