= Neasham Priory =

Priory near Sockburn, England

Coordinates: 54.4851°N 1.5035°W

Neasham Priory was a priory founded for a community of Benedictine nuns before 1157. Located on the River Tees near Sockburn, County Durham, it was the only such institution in the county to be independent of Durham Cathedral Priory. It was apparently never wealthy or notable.

== History ==
The priory was founded around 1150 by Emma, daughter of Waldef, a thegn of Hepple.

In the 15th century an investigation was conducted by the Bishop of Durham as a result of some misbehaviour by members of the community.

On 29 December 1540, the prioress Jane Lawson surrendered the house to agents of the King, and the priory was presumably dissolved at around that time. The house was acquired by her brother, James Lawson.

There are no visible remains of the priory, but since the 19th century a house known as Neasham Abbey has stood on its approximate site. A solitary wall containing a reconstructed Gothic window now stands in Darlington town centre, and is purported to have come from the priory. A more reliable remnant, however, is a large stone carving on display in the treasury at Durham Cathedral.

== Burials ==
- Ralph Fitzwilliam
