= Ralph de Greystoke, 1st Baron Greystoke =

English peer (1299–1323)

Arms of Grimthorpe for Greystoke: Barry argent and azure three chaplets of roses gules

Ralph de Greystoke, 1st Baron Greystoke (15 August 1299 – 14 July 1323), was an English peer and landowner.

== Descent and title ==
Greystoke was the son of Robert fitz Ralph (heir and second son of Ralph Fitzwilliam) and his wife Elizabeth, daughter of Robert Neville of Scotton, Lincolnshire.

Ralph Fitzwilliam descended from a family seated at (and named for) Grimthorpe, near Pocklington in the Yorkshire Wolds. The Greystoke family, though taking their name from estates in Cumberland, possessed large Yorkshire holdings centred at Nunburnholme, also near Pocklington: John Baron de Greystok, following the failure of his marriage and issue, granted his estates in fee simple to his cousin Ralph, Baron Fitzwilliam, son of his aunt Joan de Greystok, in 1297–1298, but continued to hold them for his lifetime. On John's death in 1306 the entire barony reverted to Fitzwilliam as feudal lord, who was sometimes called Lord of Greystoke.

William, Robert fitz Ralph's elder brother, predeceased their father, and Robert succeeded as Ralph Fitzwilliam's heir, when Fitzwilliam died between November 1316 and February 1317. Robert, who resided at Butterwyk in Ryedale, East Riding of Yorkshire, also died in 1317 and was buried there with a fine military effigy in stone: his inquisitions recorded Ralph, then aged 18 years, as heir to his very extensive estates.

== Career ==
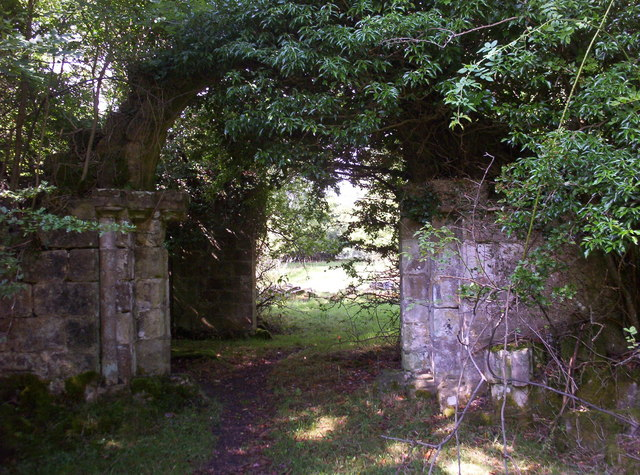
Ruins of Newminster Abbey in Northumberland. Greystoke was buried here after his death in 1323.

It was therefore Fitzwilliam's grandson, Ralph fitz Robert who, on 15 May 1321, became the first of that male line to be summoned to parliament under the name Greystoke, as 1st Baron Greystoke (of the second creation). The arms later associated with the Greystoke barony, Barry argent and azure three chaplets of roses gules, were originally those of Grimthorpe, and had been borne as such by Ralph Fitzwilliam at the Battle of Falkirk and the Siege of Caerlaverock: they superseded the former arms of Greystok, to difference the descent from Grimthorpe in the male line.

In March 1322, Ralph fitz Robert fought in the Battle of Boroughbridge, on the side of King Edward II, against Thomas, 2nd Earl of Lancaster. He was also 'a principal' in the arrest of Sir Gilbert de Middleton for treason, at Mitford Castle, in Northumberland. He was, on behalf of the king, party with Robert de Umfraville, Earl of Angus and John de Eure to an agreement by which Walter de Selby should be restored to his lands. He made an indenture with Sir Thomas de Boulton, knight, awarding him 20 marks, two robes, and a saddle suitable for a knight, yearly out of the manors of Hinderskelfe and Galmethorpe: this was probably for Sir Thomas to serve in his retinue, as Sir Nicholas de Hastings had served his grandfather.

Ralph obtained dispensation from Pope John XXII to marry Alice Audley (1300–1358), daughter of Hugh de Audley, 1st Baron Audley of Stratton Audley and Isolt le Rous, to whom he was related "within the third and fourth degrees" of consanguinity. His son and heir, William Greystoke, was born at the Fitzwilliam ancestral residence of Grimthorpe on 6 January 1321, and baptized in the manor chapel there. Ralph de Greystoke died on 14 July 1323 at Gateshead, County Durham. (The tale that this was effected by poisoning arranged by Sir Gilbert de Middleton faces the objection that Middleton had been executed for treason in 1318.) Greystoke was buried at Newminster Abbey, Northumberland.

== The survivors ==
Greystoke's widow, Alice, remarried to Ralph Neville, 2nd Baron Neville de Raby, who held guardianship of the Greystoke estates for William, Ralph Greystoke's heir, an infant when his father died. Alice's dower was assigned by the king in August 1323. Elizabeth, Ralph's mother, who long outlived both husband and son, made a will, and in 1346 died and was buried at Butterwyk, her heir being her grandson William (Ralph's son), then aged 24 years. William succeeded his father in 1342, as William de Greystoke, 2nd Baron Greystoke, and in 1344 by fine covenanted with his feoffees that the dowers of his mother and his grandmother should at their deaths revert to himself and to the male heirs of his body, and only in default of such issue of his own to descend to Robert, Ralph or William, the heirs of Ralph de Neville and Alicia. Such default did not occur.

Peerage of England
New creation	Baron Greystock; 1321–1323	Succeeded by William de Greystoke
