= Gérard de Vuippens =

Savoyard cleric, diplomat and bishop

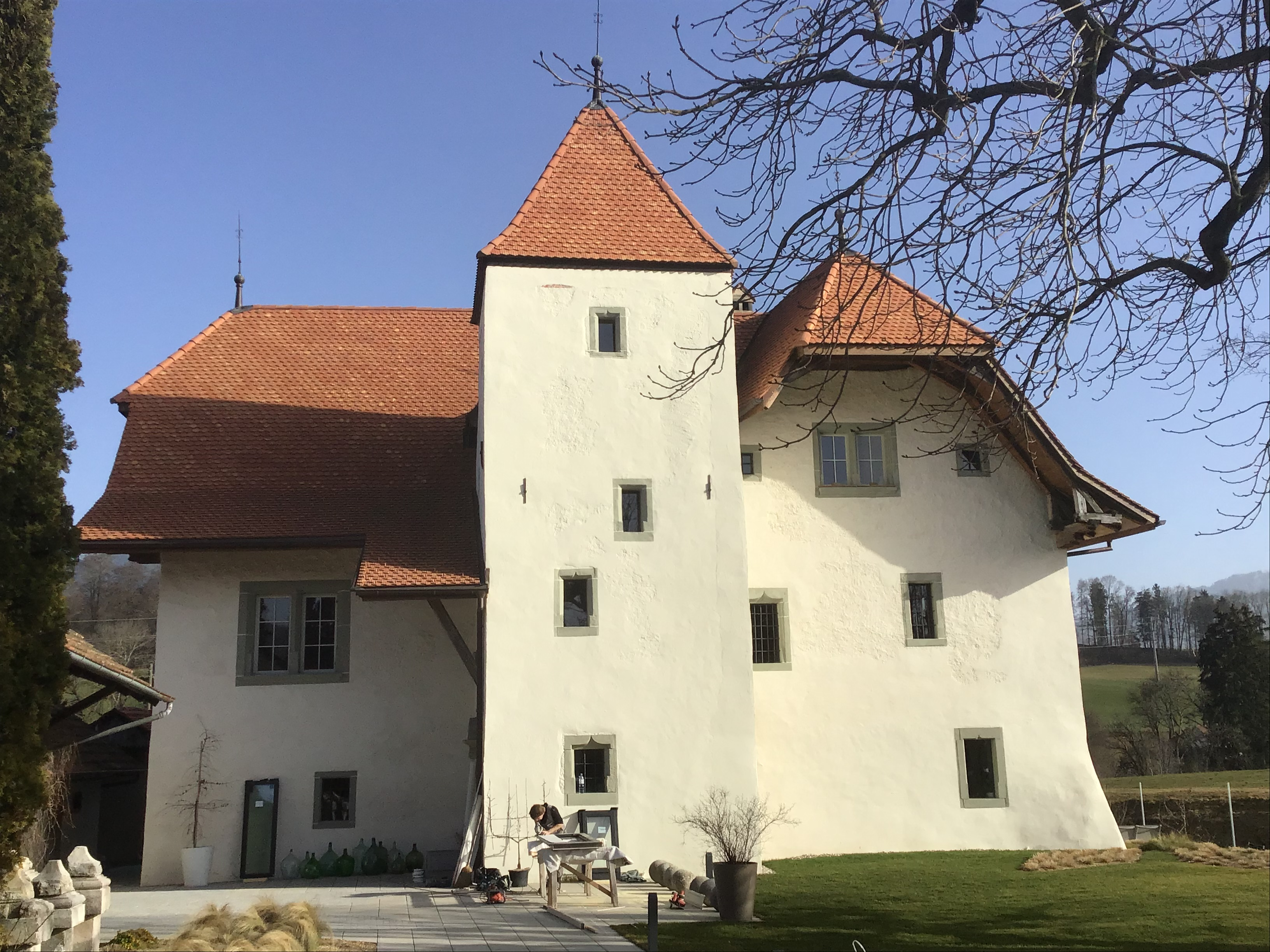
Château de Vuippens

Gérard de Vuippens was a Savoyard cleric and diplomat in England before going on to be Bishop of Lausanne.

He was the son of Ulrich de Vuippens and Agnes de Grandson, sister of Otto de Grandsonhe was accordingly a nephew of the important friend and envoy of King Edward I of England. Moved to England to become firstly a sub deacon at the Benedictine Priory of St Leonard in Stamford, then a pastor at Greystoke, Cumbria. We know of his time at Greystoke from a gift, by Edward, of ten oak trees for timber recorded in the Calendar of Close Rolls.

He went on to become a sub deacon in Richmond, North Yorkshire and Canon at York before taking on a key diplomatic role with King Edward I during the difficult negotiations with King Philip IV of France over Gascony. He left England to become firstly Bishop of Lausanne from 1301 until 1309 when he moved on to become the Bishop of Basel until his death on 17 March 1325.
