= Ralph Neville, 2nd Baron Neville =

English aristocrat (c. 1291 – 1367)

Ralph Neville
- Baron Neville
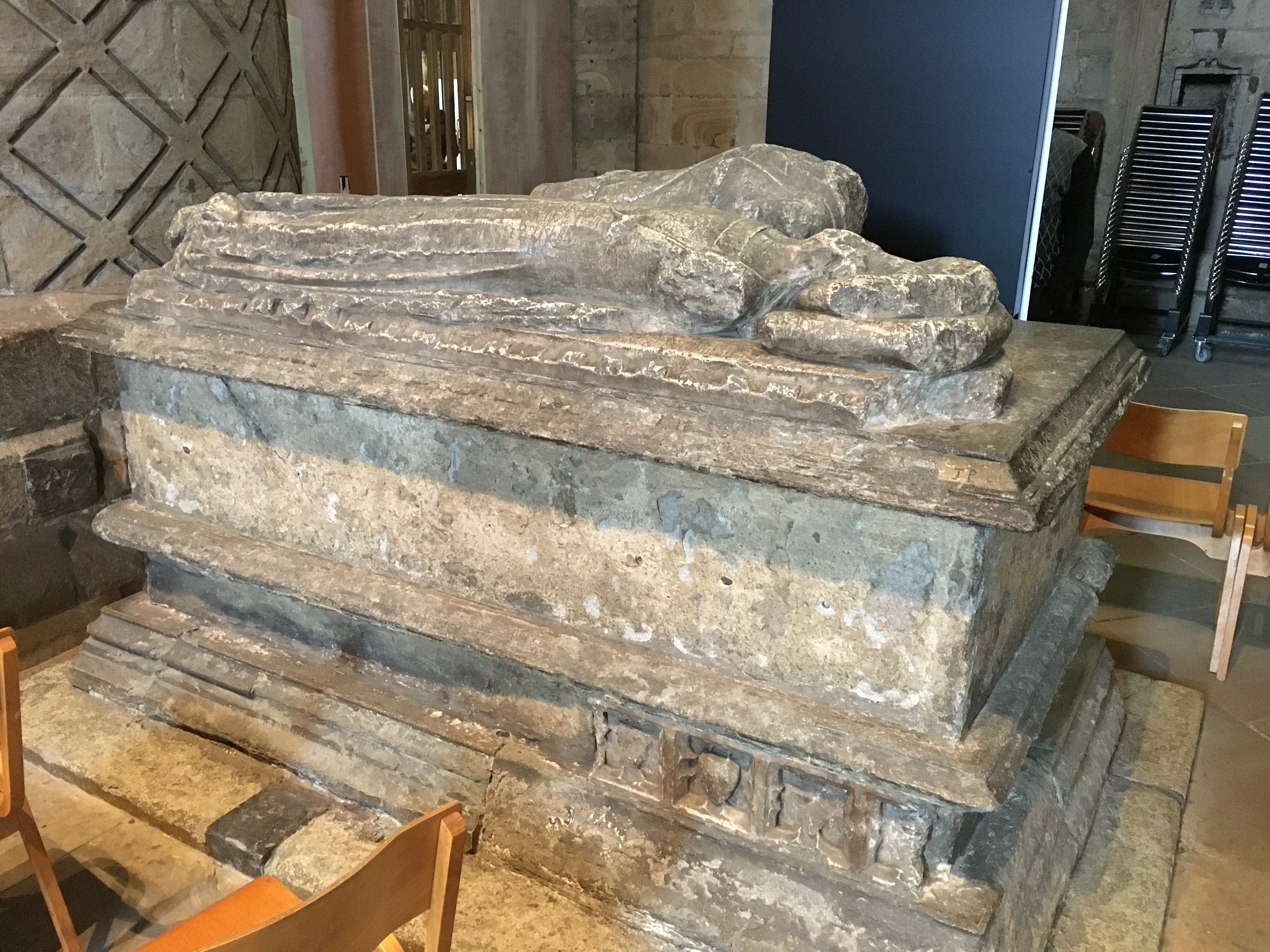
- The vandalised tomb of Ralph Neville and his wife, Alice, between two pillars in the south transept of Durham Cathedral. Alice's better-preserved effigy is closest to the viewer.
- Born: c. 1291
- Died: 5 August 1367
- Noble family: Neville
- Spouse: Alice Audley
- Issue: John Neville, 3rd Baron Neville; Alexander Neville, Archbishop of York
- Father: Ralph Neville, 1st Baron Neville de Raby
- Mother: Euphemia de Clavering

Ralph Neville, 2nd Baron Neville of Raby (c. 1291 – 5 August 1367) was an English aristocrat, the son of Ralph Neville, 1st Baron Neville de Raby and Eupheme de Clavering. (Note: The Oxford Dictionary of National Biography adopts a different numbering system, designating him the 4th Baron Neville and his father the 3rd. (Tuck 2008).) He was appointed as one of the wardens of the marches, the principal officers responsible for frontier defence, a role thereafter closely associated with the Neville family. In 1346 he commanded the English army that decisively defeated a Scottish invasion at the Battle of Neville's Cross near Durham, capturing King David II of Scotland. By the mid-14th century the Nevilles had also assumed responsibilities in naval defence, holding the post of Admiral of the North.

== Marriage and children ==
He married Alice de Audley (d. 1358), daughter of Hugh de Audley, 1st Baron Audley of Stratton Audley, and Isolde le Rous (and widow of Ralph de Greystoke, 1st Baron Greystoke, d. 1323), on 14 January 1326 with whom he had thirteen children:

1. Euphemia Neville (c. 1327 – 1394), married, first, in 1344, Robert Clifford, 4th Baron Clifford; secondly, Reynold [Reginald] Lucy, son of Thomas Baron Lucy, and thirdly Walter Heselarton, knight.
2. John Neville, 3rd Baron Neville de Raby (1322/8 – 17 October 1388), married, first, Maud Percy; secondly, Elizabeth Latimer and had issue with both.
3. Margaret Neville (12 February 1329 – 12 May 1372), married, first, William de Ros, 3rd Baron de Ros, by whom she had no issue; secondly, Henry Percy, 1st Earl of Northumberland, by whom she had issue.
4. Catherine Neville (c. 1330 – 1 September 1361), married William Dacre, 2nd Baron Dacre of Gillesland
5. Sir Ralph Neville (c. 1332 – c. 1380), married Elizabeth de Ledes
6. Robert Neville of Eldon (c. 1337), married Clara Pinckney
7. William Neville (c. 1338 – c. 1391), married, first, Elizabeth Le Waleys; secondly, Alice de St Philbert
8. Eleanor Neville (c. 1340), married Geoffrey Scrope
9. Alexander Neville (c. 1341 – 1392), Archbishop of York
10. Elizabeth Neville (c. 1343), married Sir Thomas Willoughby, son of Sir Robert Willoughby, 4th Baron Willoughby de Eresby, and Elizabeth Latimer, 5th Baroness Latimer
11. Isabel Neville (c. 1344), married Hugh FitzHugh FitzHenry
12. Thomas Neville (c. 1355)
13. Alice Neville

== Notes ==
Peerage of England
Preceded by Ranulph Neville	Baron Neville; 1331–1367	Succeeded by John Neville
