= Greystoke Castle =

Castle in Cumbria, England

Coordinates: 54.66999°N 2.87757°W

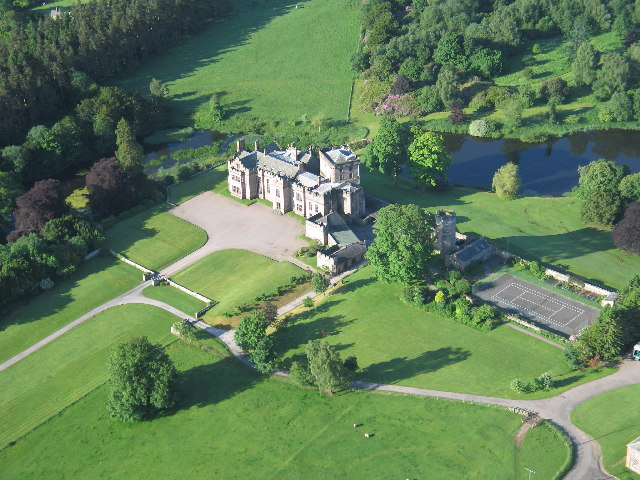
Greystoke Castle, 2005

Greystoke Castle is in the village of Greystoke 8 kilometres (5.0 mi) west of Penrith in the county of Cumbria in northern England. (grid reference NY435309). It is owned by the Howard family and is a private residence including a castle and family estate with no public access.

== Details ==
In 1069, after the Norman Conquest the English landlord Ligulf de Greystoke was re-granted his land and he built a wooden tower surrounded by a pale (or pele). The first stone structure on the site was built in 1129 by Ivo, his grandson. The building grew to become a large pele tower and in the 14th century after William de Greystoke obtained a royal licence to castellate it, the castle was further enlarged.

In 1571 the castle was in the ownership of Thomas Howard, 4th Duke of Norfolk and Earl Marshal of England through his marriage into the Dacre family, who had been the previous owners. The Howards were Catholics and Royalists and as a consequence during the Civil War the castle was laid waste by Parliamentarians under General Lambert in 1648.

The castle was enlarged and altered in 1789. Then between 1838 and 1848, the castle was rebuilt to a design by Anthony Salvin, incorporating the older structures including the pele tower, and the estates were developed by Charles Howard into a modern farm. In 1868 the house caught fire and many treasures and works of art were lost. However, the castle was rebuilt under Henry Howard, again by Salvin.

During the Second World War, the army requisitioned the castle and estate as a tank drivers' training area. The castle itself became a prisoner of war camp. Consequently, much damage was done to the building and the estate during this period. In 1950 Stafford Howard, the son of Sir Edward Stafford Howard, inherited the estate and began a further restoration period. It is now managed by his son, Neville.

== See also ==
- Grade II* listed buildings in Westmorland and Furness
- Listed buildings in Greystoke, Cumbria
- Castles in Great Britain and Ireland
- List of castles in England

== Sources ==
- Greystoke Castle. Visit Cumbria.
- History and Heritage. Greystoke Castle official website.
- Fry, Plantagenet Somerset, The David & Charles Book of Castles, David & Charles, 1980. ISBN 0-7153-7976-3
