= Greystoke, Cumbria =

Village and civil parish in England

Coordinates: 54.670°N 2.870°W

Greystoke
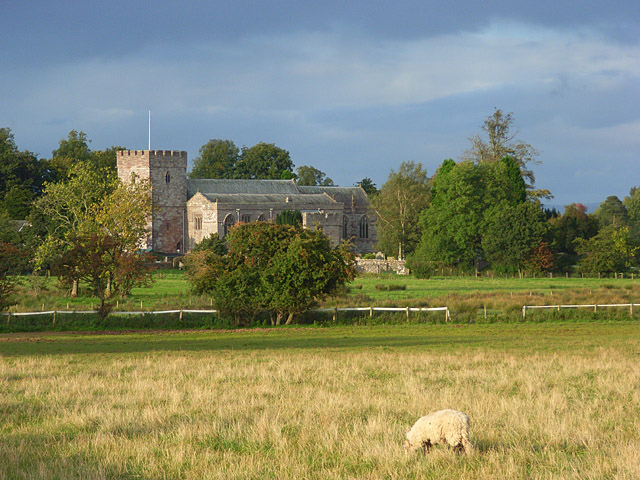
- St Andrew's Church

- Location within Cumbria
- Population: 654 (2011)
- OS grid reference: NY4430
- Civil parish: Greystoke
- Unitary authority: Westmorland and Furness
- Ceremonial county: Cumbria
- Region: North West
- Country: England
- Sovereign state: United Kingdom
- Post town: PENRITH
- Postcode district: CA11
- Dialling code: 017684
- Police: Cumbria
- Fire: Cumbria
- Ambulance: North West
- UK Parliament: Westmorland and Lonsdale

Greystoke is a village and civil parish on the edge of the Lake District National Park in Cumbria, England, about 4 miles (6.4 km) west of Penrith. At the 2001 census the parish had a population of 642, increasing marginally to 654 at the 2011 Census. The village centres on a green surrounded by stone houses and cottages.

== Buildings ==
Buildings in the village include St Andrew's parish church, which dates from the 13th century; Greystoke Castle, built by Baron Greystock in the 16th century and which stands in a 3,000-acre (12 km^{2}) park; the Boot & Shoe public house; and the outdoor swimming pool.

To the east of the village are three farmsteads built in the style of follies about 1789 by Charles Howard, 11th Duke of Norfolk, of Greystoke Castle: Fort Putnam, Bunker's Hill and Spire House.

=== St Andrew's Church ===
St Andrew's is a major church building due to its size, which is considerable for such a small parish.

Two of the first parsons were influential Savoyards. Firstly Henri of Grandson younger brother of the important friend and envoy of King Edward I of England, Otto de Grandson. Henri of Grandson would later become Bishop of Verdun then not in France but an important bishopric within the Holy Roman Empire. He was followed as parson by his relative Gérard of Vuippens who would also become an important diplomat for King Edward I of England in negotiating an end to the war with King Philip IV of France and later Bishop of Lausanne.

It was refounded as a collegiate church in 1382, by William, 14th Baron Greystoke, for a master, seven chaplains and six chantry priests. However the present building, in the Perpendicular style, is reckoned to date from the 16th and 17th centuries. It had a restoration in 1818, and then in 1848-49 it had another restoration under the architect Anthony Salvin. The nave is narrow, but the aisles are wide, with big windows, but it has no clerestory or west window. There are a number of effigies, including William, 14th Baron, and John, 16th Baron.

The east window is filled with many fragments of 16th century glass illustrating the apocyphal story of the Acts of Saints Andrew and Matthias in the City of the Man-eaters.

There is an impressive memorial to Henry Charles Howard of Greystoke, designed by Sir Robert Lorimer in the Arts and Crafts style, which dates from 1914. There are six bells which are hung for ringing in the English full-circle style.

Today, the church is home to the Greystoke Church congregation.

== Notable people ==
- Bishop John Law was born at Greystoke in 1745.
- William de Greystoke, 2nd Baron Greystoke, buried at St. Andrew's Church
- John Greystoke, 4th Baron Greystoke, buried at St. Andrew's Church
- Henri of Grandson, Bishop of Verdun and diplomat for King Edward I of England was a pastor at St. Andrews Church
- Gérard of Vuippens, Bishop of Lausanne and diplomat for King Edward I of England was a pastor at St. Andrews Church

== Governance ==
An electoral ward of the same name exists. This ward stretches south west to Threlkeld with a total population of 1,374.

== Transport ==
Stagecoach runs 1 bus route in the town, the 105 to Penrith.

== Gallery ==
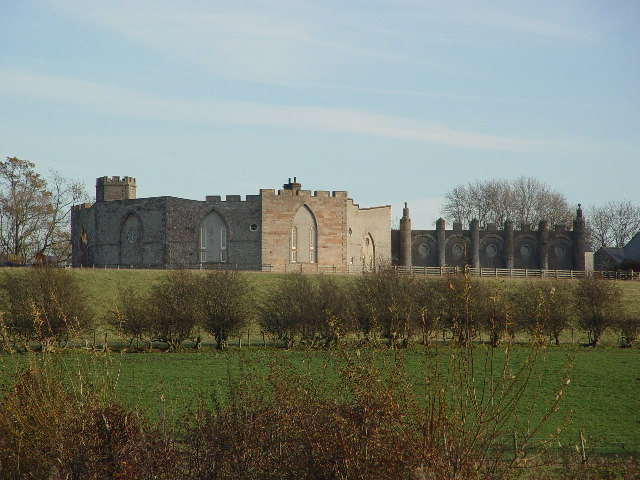
Fort Putnam

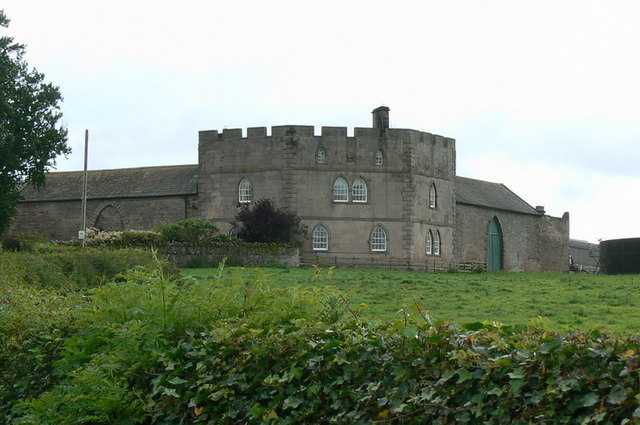
Bunker's Hill

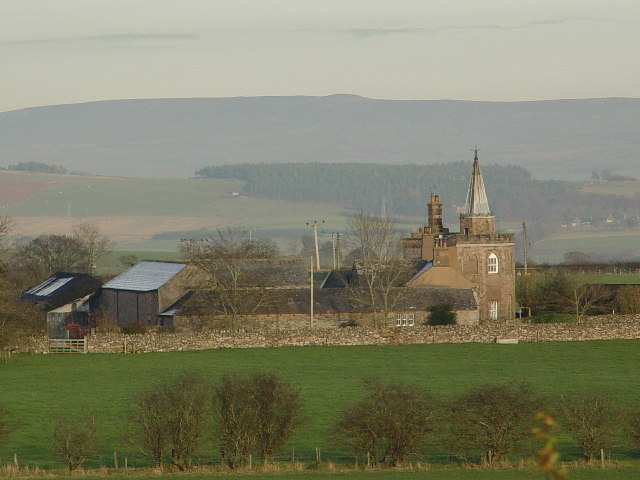
Spire House

== See also ==
- Listed buildings in Greystoke, Cumbria
