= Crosthwaite (disambiguation) =

Crosthwaite may refer to:

== Places ==
- Crosthwaite, village near Kendal, Westmorland and Furness, Cumbria, England
- Crosthwaite and Lyth, civil parish near Kendal, Westmorland and Furness, Cumbria, England
- Crosthwaite Parish Church, church in Great Crosthwaite, Keswick, Cumberland, Cumbria, England
- Crosthwaite, an ancient parish in Cumbria which contained several places including:
  - Great Crosthwaite, suburb of Keswick, Cumberland, Cumbria, England
  - Little Crosthwaite, hamlet in Cumberland, Cumbria, England

== People ==
- Adam Crosthwaite (born 1984), Australian cricketer
- Sir Charles Crosthwaite (1835–1915), Chief Commissioner of the British colony of Burma
- Hugo Crosthwaite (born 1971), Mexican figurative artist
- John Crosthwaite (1925–2010), English race car designer and engineer
- Luis Humberto Crosthwaite (born 1962), Mexican writer, editor and journalist
- Sir Moore Crosthwaite (1907–1989), British ambassador
- Philip Crosthwaite (1825–1903), Irish-American settler in California
- Ralph Crosthwaite (1935–1999), American basketball player
- Robert Crosthwaite (1837–1925), Bishop of Beverley
