= River Pool, Cumbria =

River in Cumbria, England

Coordinates: 54.2840°N 2.8202°W

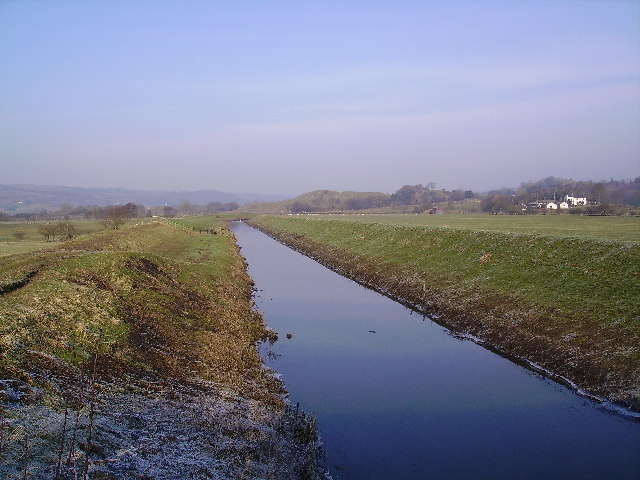
River Pool where it also known as the Underbarrow Pool

The River Pool is a river in the English county of Cumbria. The Pool rises at Waingap near the village of Crook and follows a southerly course, past the township of Underbarrow and into the Lyth Valley, where it joins the River Gilpin.
