= Cowmire Hall =

Manor house in Cumbria, England

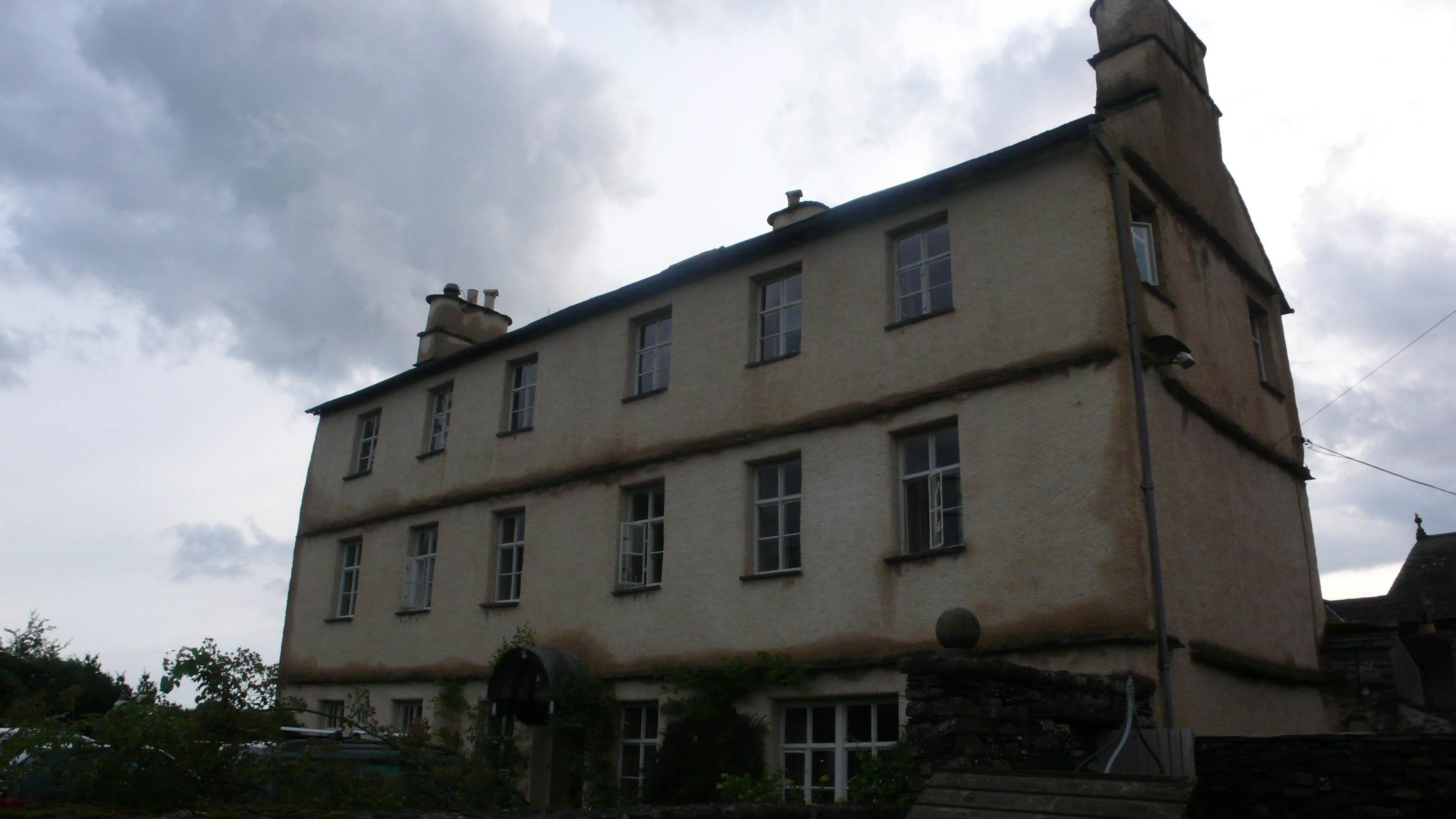
- Cowmire Hall

- Location within Cumbria
- 54°17′27″N 2°52′52″W
- Type: Manor House
- Location: Crosthwaite

Site notes
- Area: Cumbria

Listed Building – Grade II*
- Official name: Cowmire Hall
- Designated: 21 November 1952
- Reference no.: 1087118

Listed Building – Grade II
- Official name: Outbuildings to West and North of Cowmire Hall
- Designated: 21 November 1952
- Reference no.: 1335803

Cowmire Hall is a country house near Crosthwaite in Cumbria, England. The hall, the garden wall and gate piers are recorded in the National Heritage List for England as a designated Grade II* listed building.

== History ==
The hall was originally built as a tower house in the early 16th century probably for the Briggs family. It was acquired by the Newby family in the late 17th century and was extended and remodelled by Richard Fleming, a son of Sir Daniel Fleming, in the 1690s. It was owned by the Carruthers family until 1934. It was then owned by Major and Mrs Gordon until 1966 and has since been acquired by the Barrett family who use it as a home and have converted a farm building into a damson gin cellar.

== See also ==
- Grade II* listed buildings in Westmorland and Furness
- Listed buildings in Crosthwaite and Lyth
