= Devon Rodriguez =

American artist and painter

- Born: April 8, 1996 (age 30); South Bronx, New York City
- Style: Realist portraiture

TikTok information
- Page: @devonrodriguezart
- Followers: 34.3 million
- Last updated: May 10, 2025
- Website: devonrodriguezart.com

Devon Rodriguez (born April 8, 1996) is an American artist from New York City. He initially gained recognition for drawing a series of realistic portraits of commuters on the New York City Subway. In 2019, Rodriguez was a finalist in the Outwin Boochever Portrait Competition for his portrait of sculptor John Ahearn. In 2020, he joined the video hosting platform TikTok and quickly achieved a large following for quick-sketching commuters and capturing their reactions when the sketches were handed to them. Rodriguez is now the most followed visual artist on the platform.

== Early life and education ==
Devon Rodriguez was born on April 8, 1996 in the South Bronx to a family of Puerto Rican and Honduran descent. At age 8, he began doing graffiti with his friends but, after being arrested at age 13, he turned his attention to drawing portraits. In 2010, he applied for the High School of Art and Design in Manhattan, but was not accepted. He then attended Samuel Gompers High School in the Bronx for two years before being accepted to attend the High School of Art and Design in 2012. He graduated from that school in 2014, and later attended the Fashion Institute of Technology.

== Career ==
While Rodriguez was still in high school, sculptor John Ahearn attended a school portrait exhibit and took notice of Rodriguez's realist oil paintings of subway passengers. Ahearn then asked Rodriguez to be a subject for his own sculpted portrait. The resultant work, two plaster busts of Rodriguez called The Rodriguez Twins, was a finalist for the Outwin Boochever Portrait Competition and was displayed at the National Portrait Gallery in Washington, D.C. in 2016. Rodriguez attended the opening gala at the Gallery in place of Ahearn.

In 2015, Rodriguez's own pieces were featured in an issue of Southwest Art. His work, including some of his paintings of subway passengers, would go on to be featured in publications like The New Yorker, The Artist's Magazine, and The New York Times Style Magazine in the following years. Rodriguez also began taking commissions. In 2019, it was announced that Rodriguez's portrait of John Ahearn was a finalist for the Outwin Boochever Portrait Competition, three years after Ahearn's own portrait of Rodriguez received the honor. The prize eventually went to Hugo Crosthwaite.

In 2023, Rodriguez's talent agency, United Talent's Agency, staged his first pop-up solo show, "Underground", in their UTA Artist Space. Art critic Ben Davis penned an article about the show to which Rodriguez took offense. Rodriguez's subsequent Instagram posts expressing his irritation resulted in his followers sending an onslaught of angry messages to Davis and his family.

In 2026, Rodriguez faced accusations of copyright infringement and artistic plagiarism when he was alleged to have copied two commissioned works by New York artist Gavin Snider, created specifically for the New York Knicks.
