= Listed buildings in Crosthwaite and Lyth =

Crosthwaite and Lyth is a civil parish in the Westmorland and Furness district of Cumbria, England. It contains 38 listed buildings that are recorded in the National Heritage List for England. Of these, one is listed at Grade II*, the middle of the three grades, and the others are at Grade II, the lowest grade. The parish is in the Lake District National Park. It contains the villages and smaller settlements of Crosthwaite, Crosthwaite Green and Rowe, and is otherwise rural. Most of the listed buildings are houses and associated structures, farmhouses and farm buildings. The other listed buildings include bridges, limekilns, a corn mill and ancillary buildings, a former school, a mill dam and associated structures, and a church.

== Key ==
| Grade | Criteria |
|---|---|
| II* | Particularly important buildings of more than special interest |
| II | Buildings of national importance and special interest |

== Buildings ==
| Name and location | Photograph | Date | Notes | Grade |
|---|---|---|---|---|
| Cowmire Hall; 54.29083°N 2.88097°W | | Late 16th century | A country house that originated as a tower house, with the front range added in about 1690. It is in stone, mainly roughcast, with slate roofs. The main range has a front of three storeys and six bays. The central entrance has limestone quoins and a semicircular wooden hood. The windows on the front are cross-mullioned, and elsewhere there are casement windows. The tower to the west is gabled and contains mullioned windows. Inside, the ground floor has a tunnel vault and there are garderobes in the upper floors. In front of the house is a stone wall and gate piers that have cornices and ball finials. | II* |
| Mireside Farmhouse and barn 54.30879°N 2.86741°W | — | Late 17th century | The farmhouse and barn are in stone with Westmorland slate roofs. The farmhouse consists of a two-storey two-bay house attached to a slightly recessed two-story single-bay cottage. It contains quoins, a gabled porch, and windows with hood moulds. The separate barn to the south has quoins, and contains slit vents, a blocked full-height threshing door, doors with slate canopies, an owl hole, and an external stone stairway. | II |
| Pool Bank Farmhouse; 54.28281°N 2.87688°W | | 1693 | The farmhouse is in stone with a slate roof. It has two storeys and an L-shaped plan, consisting of two ranges at right angles. The north west range has five bays, and contains a doorway with an embattled lintel inscribed with initials and the date, and a gabled canopy. The southwest wing also has five bays, and an outbuilding to the right. At the rear is a doorway with a lintel that has a sunk ogee and a hood mould, and a wooden balcony. Most of the windows are cross-mullioned. | II |
| Outbuilding east of High Birks Farmhouse; 54.30756°N 2.88054°W | — | 1695 | A bank barn in stone on a stepped plinth, with limestone dressings and quoins, and a Westmorland slate roof with coped gables and a finial. It has two storeys at the front, one at the rear, five bays, a lean-to extension at the west, and a gabled extension at the east. The openings include doors, a winnowing door with a canopy, and windows, and there is a slate datestone. | II |
| Birks Bridge; 54.31911°N 2.90364°W | | 17th or 18th century (probable) | A clapper bridge over the River Winster, it has four rectangular piers and abutments. Its flagstones are continued beyond the bridge as a raised pavement, and there is an iron handrail. | II |
| Flodder Hall and outbuildings 54.28250°N 2.83516°W | — | 17th or early 18th century (probable) | A farmhouse and outbuildings in stone with slate roofs. The house has two storeys and five bays, the first bay is lower and the fifth bay is gabled. On the front is a gabled porch with a ball finial and a datestone. The windows vary and include sash windows, some of them horizontally-sliding, some are casements, and others are mullioned. The outbuildings to the east have entrances with ball finials, and windows of varied types. | II |
| Hill Farmhouse and adjoining outbuilding 54.31830°N 2.88028°W | — | Late 17th or 18th century (probable) | The farmhouse and outbuilding are in stone, the house roughcast, and they have slate roofs. The house has two storeys, four bays, and two rear outshuts. On the front the windows are sashes, one is horizontally-sliding, and at the rear there are mullioned windows. At the entrance is a gabled porch, and inside the outbuilding is a raised cruck truss. | II |
| Pool Bank North with outbuilding 54.28348°N 2.87674°W | | Late 17th or early 18th century (probable) | The house and outbuilding are in roughcast stone with slate roofs. The house has two storeys with attics, three bays, and a rear gabled wing. The main windows on the front are 20th-century casements, the attic windows are mullioned, one also with a transom, and the windows in the rear wing vary. On the front of the house is a central gabled porch. The outbuilding to the left is lower, it has two entrances, and an outshut at the rear. | II |
| Barn, Pool Bank Farm; 54.28321°N 2.87668°W | | Late 17th or 18th century (probable) | A double barn that was extended in 1733, and later converted for residential use. It is roughcast with a slate roof, and has a main range flanked by gabled wings with ball finials. In the left gable end are dove holes in a triangular frame, and a datestone, and in the right gable is a panel with a hood mould. In the main range are two barn entrances, windows, and ventilation slits. | II |
| High Cartmell Fold Farmhouse; 54.31598°N 2.85400°W | — | 1723 | A roughcast farmhouse with a slate roof, two storeys, two bays, and a rear outshut. On the front is a gabled porch with a segmental-headed opening and a datestone above. The windows on the front are sashes, at the rear they are casements, and in the right return is a cross-mullioned window. | II |
| Outbuildings, Cowmire Hall; 54.29097°N 2.88136°W | — | Early 18th century (probable) | The farm buildings form three sides of a courtyard. The north range is the earliest, the rest dating from the mid- to late 19th century. The buildings are in stone with slate roofs, and include barns, cow houses, and a granary. Features include limestone dressings, mullioned windows, hood moulds, a winnowing door, owl holes, and ball finials. | II |
| Draw Well and Inman Howe; 54.28646°N 2.83556°W | — | Early 18th century (probable) | A pair of houses one of which, Inman Howe, was converted from a barn. They are in stone with slate roofs. Draw Well has two storeys and three bays, and a gabled porch. Most of the windows are fixed. Inman Howe has an outshut on the front, narrow windows and ventilation slits. | II |
| Low Cartmell Fold; 54.31517°N 2.85382°W | — | Early 18th century (probable) | A roughcast stone house with a slate roof, two storeys with attics, four bays, and a rear wing with an outshut. The windows on the front are sashes with drip courses above the ground floor windows, and elsewhere there are casement windows. The entrance on the front is a gabled canopy, and in the rear wing is a gabled porch. | II |
| Pool Bank House; 54.28303°N 2.87703°W | | Early 18th century (probable) | A roughcast stone house with a slate roof, two storeys, three bays, and a rear gabled wing. On the front is a gabled canopy on brackets. The windows on the front are sashes, and at the rear they are casements. At the north end is a 20th-century conservatory. | II |
| Spout House; 54.31831°N 2.85575°W | — | Early 18th century | A roughcast stone house with slate roofs. It has two storeys with attics, a front of six bays, and a rear wing and outshut. The right two bay project forward under a gable. Some windows are casements, others are sashes, and some of these are horizontally-sliding. On the front is a lean-to porch. | II |
| Crosthwaite Corn Mill and ancillary buildings 54.30961°N 2.86084°W | — | 18th century (probable) | The buildings are in slate and limestone with quoins and roofs of slate and corrugated asbestos. The mill has a square plan, three storeys and two bays, and to the east is a store with four bays and three storeys. To the north is a two-storey, two-bay kiln, and to the west is a three-bay single-storey stable. The mill race is built with limestone blocks held by iron clamps. | II |
| Pig sty, Crosthwaite Corn Mill; 54.30967°N 2.86034°W | — | 18th century (probable) | The pig sty is in stone with a slate roof. It has a single storey, one bay, and an outshut to the south. On the west side are low walls enclosing a pig run. | II |
| Outbuilding, Flodder Hall; 54.28244°N 2.83566°W | — | 18th century (probable) | The building is in stone with quoins and a slate roof. It contains two entrances, ventilation slits, a mullioned window, and steps leading to a first floor entrance on the south side. On the west side is a later timber open fronted shed. | II |
| Barn, Pool Bank Farm; 54.28258°N 2.87673°W | | 18th century (probable) | The barn is in stone with some brick infill, and has a slate roof. It has an L-shaped plan, consisting of two wings at right angles, the north wing being later. The barn contains entrances, one with a segmental head, and ventilation slits. | II |
| Ormandy House and outbuilding 54.31291°N 2.84974°W | — | Mid- to late 18th century (probable) | A roughcast house with a slate roof, two storeys and three bays. The windows on the front are sashes with segmental heads, and at the rear is a mullioned window and a stair window. The doorway has a segmental head with a keystone and a gabled canopy. The outbuilding to the right is lower with two bays, a large entrance in the ground floor and casement windows above. | II |
| Crosthwaite House; 54.31292°N 2.85030°W | | Late 18th or early 19th century (probable) | A roughcast stone house with a sill band, a top frieze, a moulded gutter, and a slate roof. There are three storeys, three bays, and a lean-to outshut on the left. The windows are sashes, and at the rear is a stair window. The porch has a round-arched opening and a cornice, and above the door is a fanlight. | II |
| Barn, Flodder Hall; 54.28268°N 2.83510°W | — | 18th or 19th century (probable) | A stone bank barn with outshuts, two storeys, and a slate roof. It has a central barn entrance, other smaller entrances, steps leading up to a first floor door, ventilation slits, and square holes. | II |
| Footbridge; 54.31705°N 2.86886°W | | 18th or 19th century (possible) | The footbridge crosses the River Gilpin, and is in slate, limestone and concrete. It consists of three upright slabs and flat slabs, and is about 108 millimetres (4.3 in) wide and 9 metres (30 ft) long. The bridge is continued as a causeway of about 17 metres (56 ft) to the east and about 4 metres (13 ft) to the west. | II |
| Limekiln; 54.28841°N 2.83967°W | — | 18th or 19th century (probable) | The limekiln is in stone. It has a fire hole to the north with canted sides and a lintel, and there is a small recess above it. | II |
| Limekiln; 54.29890°N 2.84451°W | — | Late 18th or 19th century (probable) | The limekiln stands in a triangular enclosure. It is in stone and is tall with a square plan. There is a fire hole to the east. | II |
| Bridge near Lyth Valley Hotel; 54.29938°N 2.84127°W | — | Early 19th century (probable) | The bridge crosses a drainage channel. It is in stone and consists of a single segmental arch. The bridge has low parapets, and is about 3.5 metres (11 ft) wide. | II |
| Former dame school 54.31309°N 2.85024°W | — | Early 19th century | The former dame school is in stone with quoins and a slate roof. It is square and consists of a single cell with two storeys. There are two windows in the south front, and steps on the west side leading to an entrance. | II |
| Lord's Bridge; 54.31484°N 2.86878°W | — | Early 19th century | The bridge carries a road, Totter Bank, over River Gilpin, and is on the former Kendal to Kirkby Ireleth turnpike road. The bridge is in stone, and consists of a single segmental arch with a band, and parapets consisting of large slabs. | II |
| Farmhouse and barn, Crosthwaite Corn Mill; 54.30979°N 2.86061°W | — | c. 1828 | The farmhouse and barn are in stone with quoins and slate roofs. The house is rendered, with two storeys and three bays. It has a gabled porch containing side benches, and 20th-century casement windows. The barn to the right has a single storey, three bays, and an L-shaped plan. It contains a wagon entrance, doors, and windows. | II |
| Bee house (east), Crosthwaite House; 54.31327°N 2.85052°W | — | 19th century (probable) | The bee house was a structure for housing bee hives. It is in stone with a slate roof, and consists of a small gabled structure with an open south side. | II |
| Bee house (west), Crosthwaite House; 54.31327°N 2.85055°W | — | 19th century (probable) | The bee house was a structure for housing bee hives. It is in stone with a slate roof, and consists of a small gabled structure with an open east side. | II |
| Privy, Crosthwaite House; 54.31308°N 2.85046°W | — | 19th century (probable) | The building is in stone with a slate roof. There are entrances on the east and north sides, and inside is a wooden seat with three holes. | II |
| Limekiln; 54.29853°N 2.86948°W | | 19th century (probable) | The limekiln is in limestone and has a square plan. On the west side is a fire hole with canted sides and iron lintels. The charge hole has been filled in. | II |
| Limekiln; 54.29652°N 2.84763°W | | 19th century (probable) | The limekiln is in stone. It has a rectangular plan and a fire hole with a segmental head. The charge hole has been blocked. | II |
| Limekiln; 54.29111°N 2.83974°W | — | 19th century (probable) | The limekiln is in stone. It is a large rectangular structure, and has a fire hole with an elliptical head to the east. On the west side is a low wall with a blocked opening. | II |
| Mill dam with weir, sluice gate, and mill race 54.30952°N 2.86163°W | — | 19th century (probable) | The structure may incorporate earlier features, it is mainly constructed in drystone and includes natural outcrops of rock. The sluice gate mechanism is in cast iron, and the gate is opened by a cast iron wheel. | II |
| Outbuilding ESE of High Birks Farmhouse; 54.30769°N 2.88086°W | — | 1853 | A large bank barn in stone with limestone dressings and quoins, a Westmorland slate roof, two storeys, five bays, and rear outshuts. On the south side is a full length canopy. There are various openings including doors, windows, a winnowing door, and ventilation slits. | II |
| St Mary's Church; 54.31285°N 2.85294°W | | 1877–78 | The tower was replaced in 1885. The church is in limestone with sandstone dressings and a slate roof, and is Perpendicular in style. It consists of a nave and a chancel in a single cell, with gabled buttresses, a cornice, and a plain parapet, a south transept, a polygonal apse, and a west tower. The tower has three stages, a top cornice, gargoyles, a coped parapet, and a pyramidal roof with a weathervane. | II |
