= Tidal bore =

Water wave traveling up a river or narrow bay because of an incoming tide

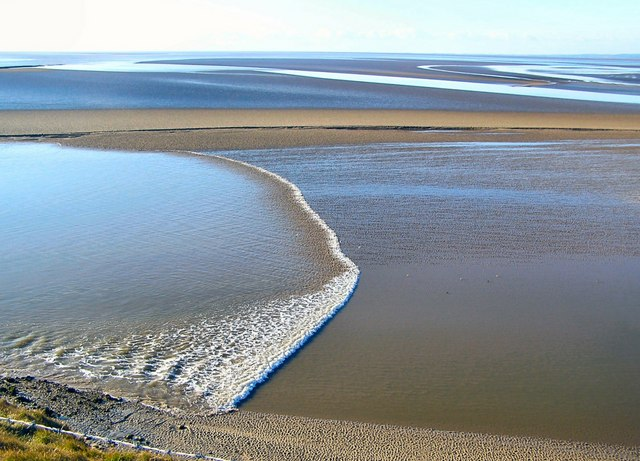
A bore in Morecambe Bay, in the United Kingdom

Video of the Arnside Bore, in the United Kingdom

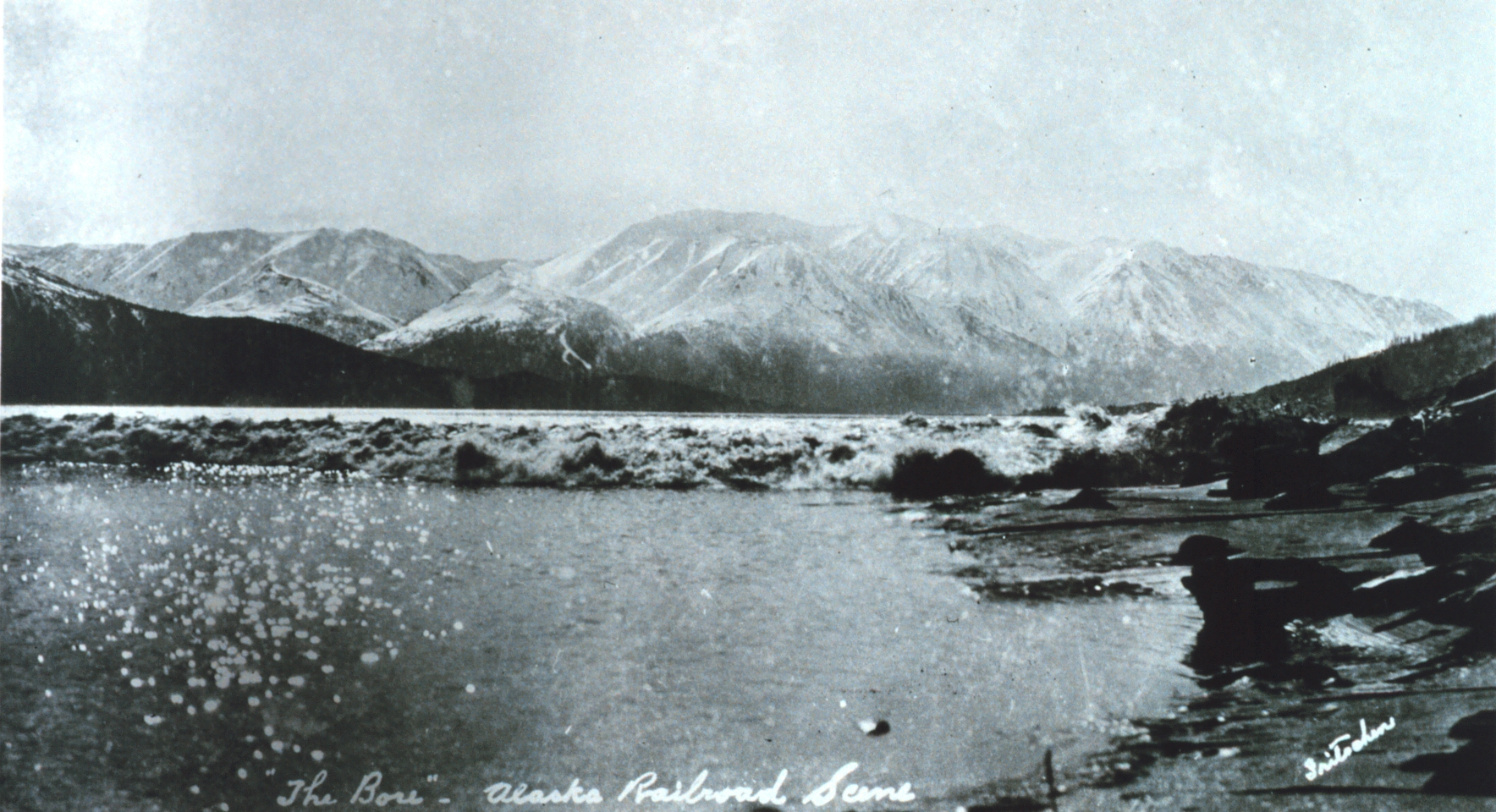
The tidal bore in Upper Cook Inlet, in Alaska

A tidal bore, often simply given as bore in context, is a tidal phenomenon in which the leading edge of the incoming tide forms a wave (or waves) of water that travels up a river or narrow bay, reversing the direction of the river or bay's current. It is a strong tide that pushes up the river, against the current.

== Description ==
Bores occur in relatively few locations worldwide, usually in areas with a large tidal range (typically more than 6 meters (20 ft) between high and low tide) and where incoming tides are funneled into a shallow, narrowing river or lake via a broad bay. The funnel-like shape not only increases the tidal range, but it can also decrease the duration of the flood tide, down to a point where the flood appears as a sudden increase in the water level. A tidal bore takes place during the flood tide and never during the ebb tide.

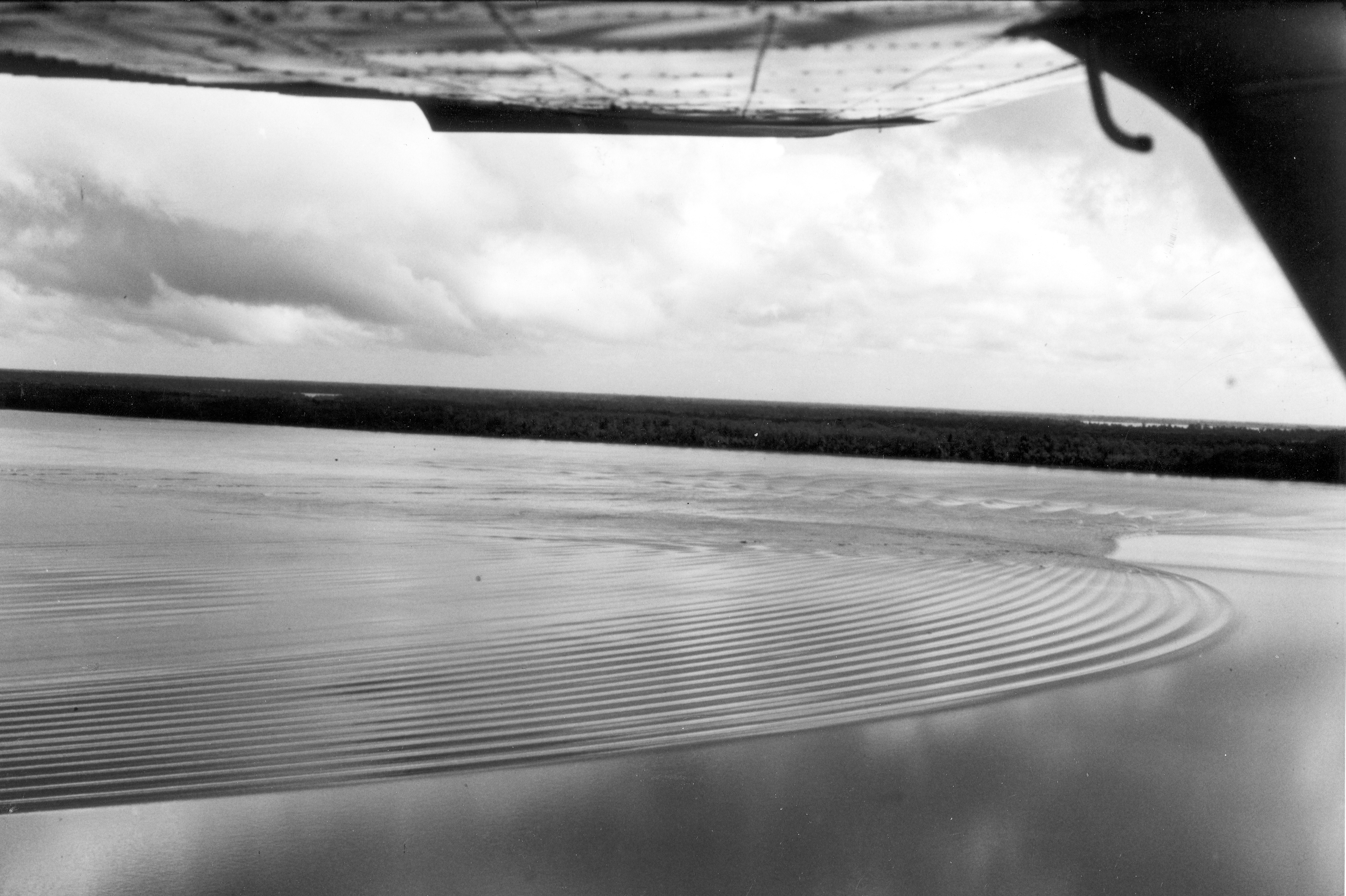
Undular bore and whelps near the mouth of Araguari River in northeastern Brazil. The view is oblique towards the mouth from airplane at approximately 30 m (100 ft) altitude.

A tidal bore may take on various forms, ranging from a single breaking wavefront with a roller — somewhat like a hydraulic jump— to undular bores, comprising a smooth wavefront followed by a train of secondary waves known as whelps. Large bores can be particularly unsafe for shipping but also present opportunities for river surfing.

Two key features of a tidal bore are the intense turbulence and turbulent mixing generated during the bore propagation, as well as its rumbling noise. The visual observations of tidal bores highlight the turbulent nature of the surging waters. The tidal bore induces a strong turbulent mixing in the estuarine zone, and the effects may be felt along considerable distances. The velocity observations indicate a rapid deceleration of the flow associated with the passage of the bore as well as large velocity fluctuations. A tidal bore creates a powerful roar that combines the sounds caused by the turbulence in the bore front and whelps, entrained air bubbles in the bore roller, sediment erosion beneath the bore front and of the banks, scouring of shoals and bars, and impacts on obstacles. The bore rumble is heard far away because its low frequencies can travel over long distances. The low-frequency sound is a characteristic feature of the advancing roller in which the air bubbles entrapped in the large-scale eddies are acoustically active and play the dominant role in the rumble-sound generation.

== Etymology ==
The word bore derives through Old English from the Old Norse word bára, meaning "wave" or "swell."

== Effects ==
Tidal bores can be dangerous. Certain rivers such as the Seine in France, the Petitcodiac River in Canada, and the Colorado River in Mexico to name a few, have had a sinister reputation in association with tidal bores. In China, despite warning signs erected along the banks of the Qiantang River, a number of fatalities occur each year by people who take too much risk with the bore. The tidal bores affect the shipping and navigation in the estuarine zone, for example, in Papua New Guinea (in the Fly and Bamu Rivers), Malaysia (the Benak in the Batang Lupar), and India (the Hooghly River bore).

On the other hand, tidal bore-affected estuaries are rich feeding zones and breeding grounds of several forms of wildlife. The estuarine zones are the spawning and breeding grounds of several native fish species, while the aeration induced by the tidal bore contributes to the abundant growth of many species of fish and shrimp (for example in the Rokan River, Indonesia). The tidal bores also provide opportunity for recreational inland surfing, such as the Seven Ghosts bore on the Kampar River, Indonesia or the Severn Bore on the River Severn, England.

=== Scientific studies ===
Scientific studies have been carried out at the River Dee in Wales in the United Kingdom, the Garonne and Sélune in France, the Daly River in Australia, and the Qiantang River estuary in China. The force of the tidal bore flow often poses a challenge to scientific measurements, as evidenced by a number of field work incidents in the River Dee, Rio Mearim, Daly River, and Sélune River. In terms of physical modelling (hydrodynamics), a tidal bore often well represented by a soliton.

== Rivers and bays with tidal bores ==
Rivers and bays that have been known to exhibit bores include those listed below.

=== Asia ===
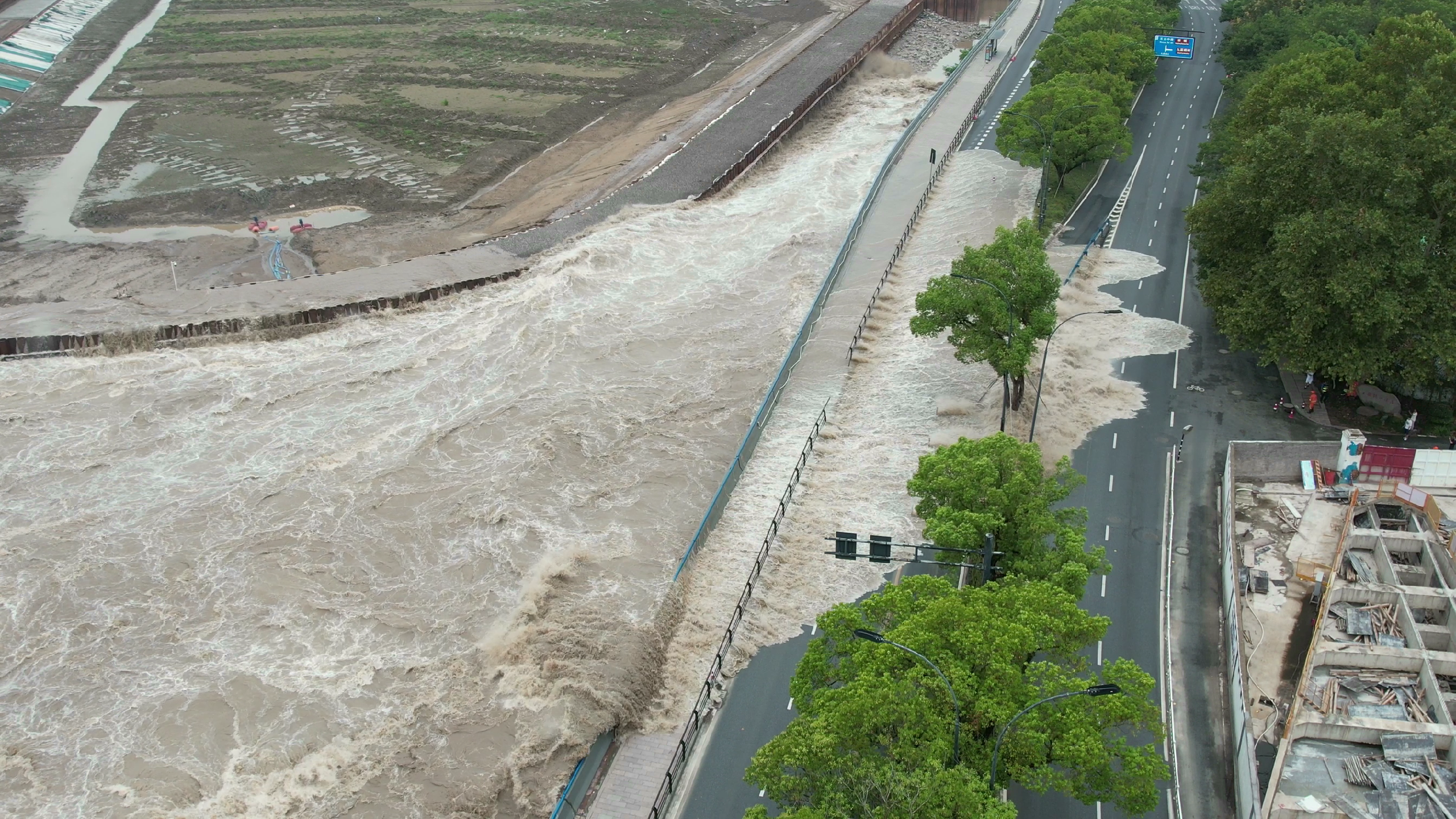
The Qiantang River tidal bore overwhelming local infrastructure in 2024

- Ganges–Brahmaputra, India and Bangladesh
- Indus River, India and Pakistan
- Sittaung River, Burma
- Qiantang River, China, which has the world's largest bore, up to 9 m (30 ft) high, traveling at up to 40 km/h (25 mph)
- Batang Lupar or Lupar River, near Sri Aman, Malaysia. The tidal bore is locally known as benak.
- Batang Sadong or Sadong River, Sarawak, Malaysia.
- Bono, Kampar River, at Meranti Bay, Pelalawan, Indonesia. The phenomenon is feared by the locals to sink ships. It is reported to break up to 130 km (81 mi) inland, but usually up to 40 km (25 mi) with 6 m (20 ft) height.

=== Oceania ===
==== Australia ====
- Styx River, Queensland
- Daly River, Northern Territory

==== New Zealand ====
- Wairoa River, Northland Region

==== Papua New Guinea ====
- Fly River
- Turama River

=== Europe ===
==== Ireland ====
- River Shannon, up the Shannon Estuary to Limerick, Ireland: 21 September 2013

==== United Kingdom ====
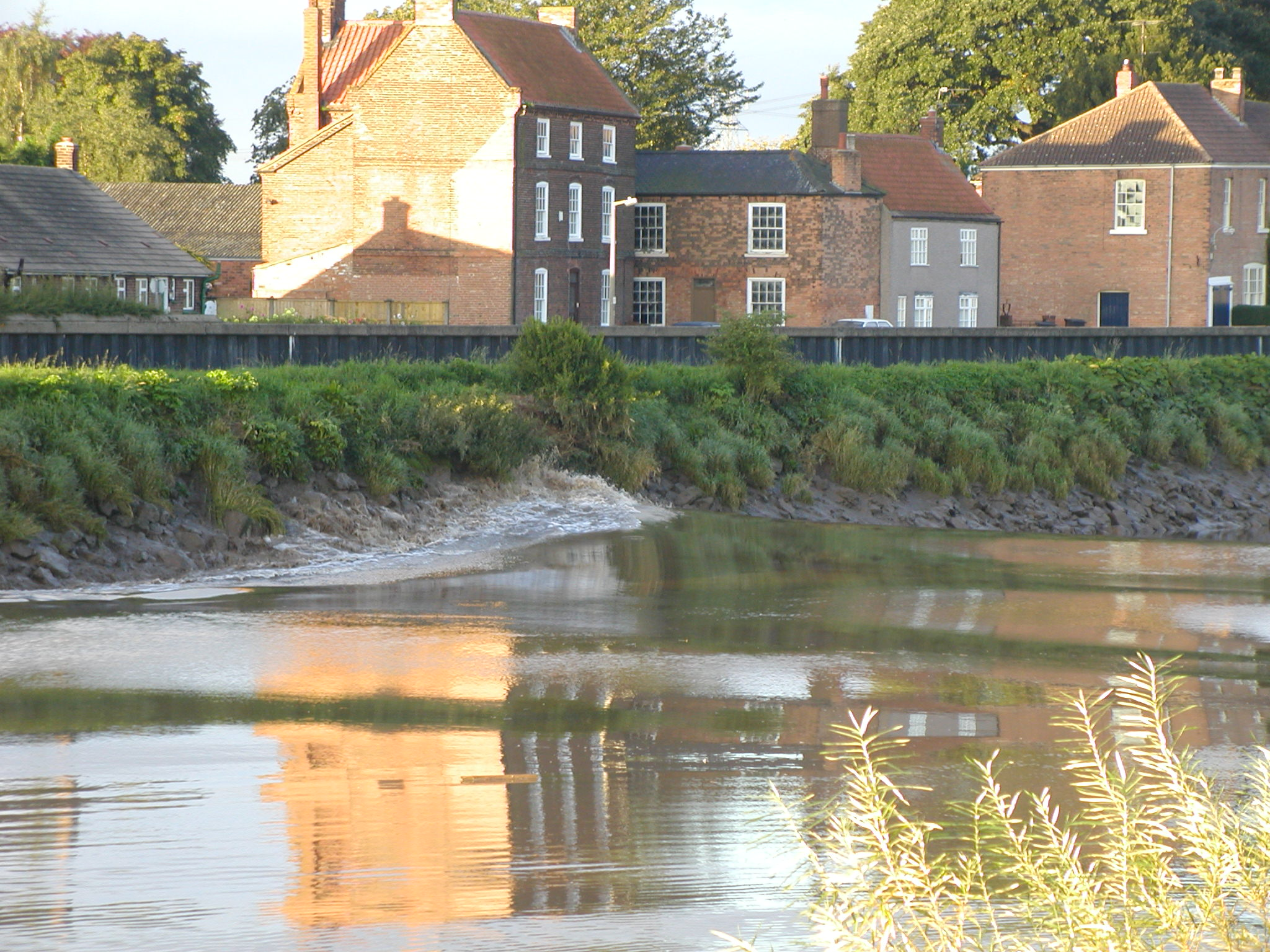
The Trent Aegir seen from West Stockwith, Nottinghamshire, 20 September 2005

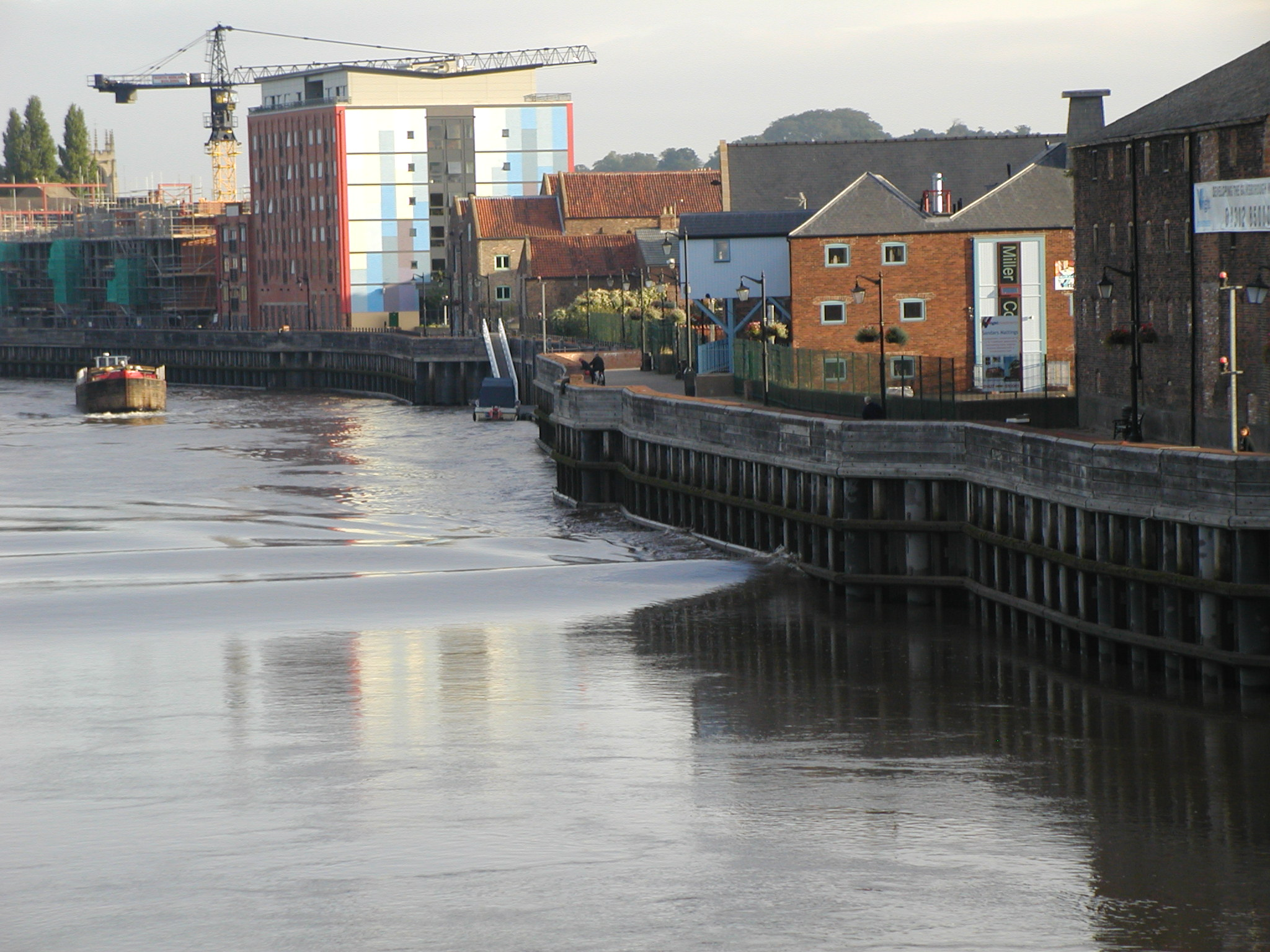
The Trent Aegir at Gainsborough, Lincolnshire, 20 September 2005

- River Dee, Wales and England
- River Mersey. The second highest tidal bore after the Severn bore, up to 1.7 meters (6 ft) high. The bore tends to form around the Manchester Ship Canal.
- The Severn bore on the River Severn, Wales and England, up to 2 meters (7 ft) high
- The Trent Aegir on the River Trent, England, up to 1.5 meters (5 ft) high. Also other tributaries of the Humber Estuary.
- River Parrett
- River Welland
- The Arnside Bore on the River Kent
- River Great Ouse
- River Ouse, Yorkshire. Like the Trent bore, this is also known as "the Aegir".
- River Eden
- River Esk
- River Nene. This was also known as the Eagre.
- River Nith
- River Lune, Lancashire
- River Ribble, Lancashire
- River Yealm, Devon
- River Leven, Cumbria

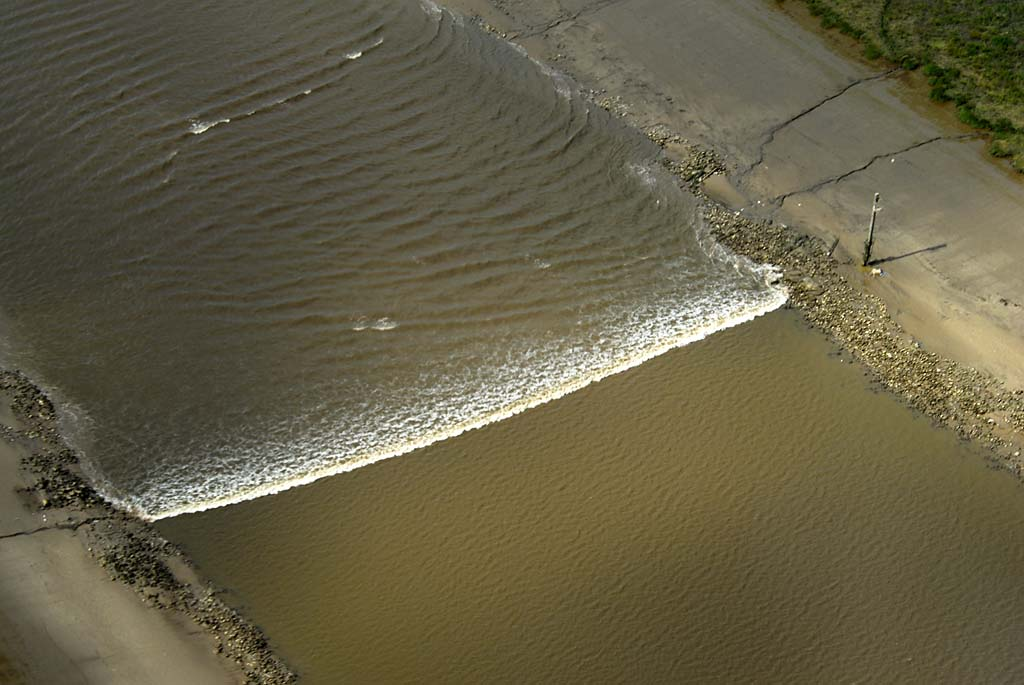
Tidal bore on the River Ribble

==== Belgium ====
- Durme, Flanders

==== France ====
The phenomenon is generally named un mascaret in French. but some other local names are preferred.

- Seine had a significant bore until the 1960s, locally named la barre. Since then, it has been practically eliminated by dredging and river training.
- Bay of Mont-Saint-Michel including Couesnon, Sélune, and Sée
- Arguenon
- Frémur (baie de la Fresnaye)
- Vire
- Sienne
- Vilaine, locally named le mascarin
- Dordogne
- Garonne

=== North America ===
==== United States ====
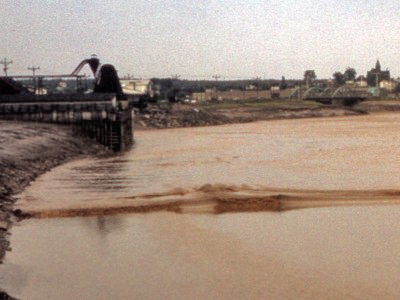
Tidal bore on the Petitcodiac River

- The Turnagain Arm of Cook Inlet, Alaska. Up to 2 meters (7 ft) and 20 km/h (12 mph).
- Historically, the Colorado River had a tidal bore up to 6 feet, that extended 47 miles up river.
- The Savannah River up to 10 miles (16 km) inland.
- Small tidal bores, only a few inches in height, have been observed advancing up tidal bayous on the Mississippi Gulf Coast.

==== Canada ====
With the Bay of Fundy having the highest tidal range in the world, most rivers draining into the upper bay between Nova Scotia and New Brunswick have significant tidal bores. They include:

- The Petitcodiac River formerly had the highest bore in North America at over 2 metres (6.6 ft) in height, but causeway construction between Moncton and Riverview in the 1960s led to subsequent extensive sedimentation which reduced the bore to little more than a ripple. After considerable political controversy, the causeway gates were opened on April 14, 2010, as part of the Petitcodiac River Restoration Project and the tidal bore began to grow again. The restoration of the bore has been sufficient that in July 2013, professional surfers rode a 1 metre (3.3 ft)-high wave 29 kilometres (18.0 mi) up the Petitcodiac River from Belliveau Village to Moncton to establish a new North American record for continuous surfing.
- The Shubenacadie River in Nova Scotia. When the tidal bore approaches, completely drained riverbeds are filled. It has caused the deaths of several tourists who were in the riverbeds when the bore came in. Tour boat operators offer rafting excursions in the summer.
- The bore is fastest and highest on some of the smaller rivers that connect to the bay including the River Hebert and Maccan River on the Cumberland Basin, the St. Croix and Kennetcook rivers in the Minas Basin, and the Salmon River in Truro.

==== Mexico ====
Historically, there was a tidal bore on the Gulf of California in Mexico at the mouth of the Colorado River. It formed in the estuary about Montague Island and propagated upstream. It was once very strong, but diversions of the river for irrigation have weakened the flow of the river to the point the tidal bore has nearly disappeared.

=== South America ===
==== Brazil ====
- Amazon River in Brazil, up to 4 meters (13 ft) high, running at up to 13 mph (21 km/h). It is known locally as the pororoca.
- Mearim River in Brazil
- Araguari River in Brazil. Very strong in the past, it is considered lost since 2015, due to buffaloes farming, irrigation, and dam construction along the river, leading to substantial loss of water flow.

==== Venezuela ====
- Orinoco River in Venezuela

==== Chile ====
- Southern Channels, ex. Canal de Castro, Chiloé Island (fjord of Castro) in Chile

== Lakes with tidal bores ==
Lakes with an ocean inlet can also exhibit tidal bores.

=== North America ===
- Nitinat Lake on Vancouver Island has a sometimes dangerous tidal bore at Nitinat Narrows where the lake meets the Pacific Ocean. The lake is popular with windsurfers due to its consistent winds.

== In popular culture ==
- In the Dalemark Quartet by Diana Wynne Jones, the antagonist Kankredin is a tidal bore.

== See also ==
- 1812 New Madrid earthquake, a historic earthquake in the United States that caused the Mississippi River to flow backwards temporarily
- Tidal race
- Tsunami
- Tonlé Sap, a lake and river system in Cambodia where monsoon flooding can cause the river to flow backwards temporarily, albeit not as a tidal bore
