= Lyth Valley =

Valley in Cumbria, England

Coordinates: 54.29943°N 2.84220°W

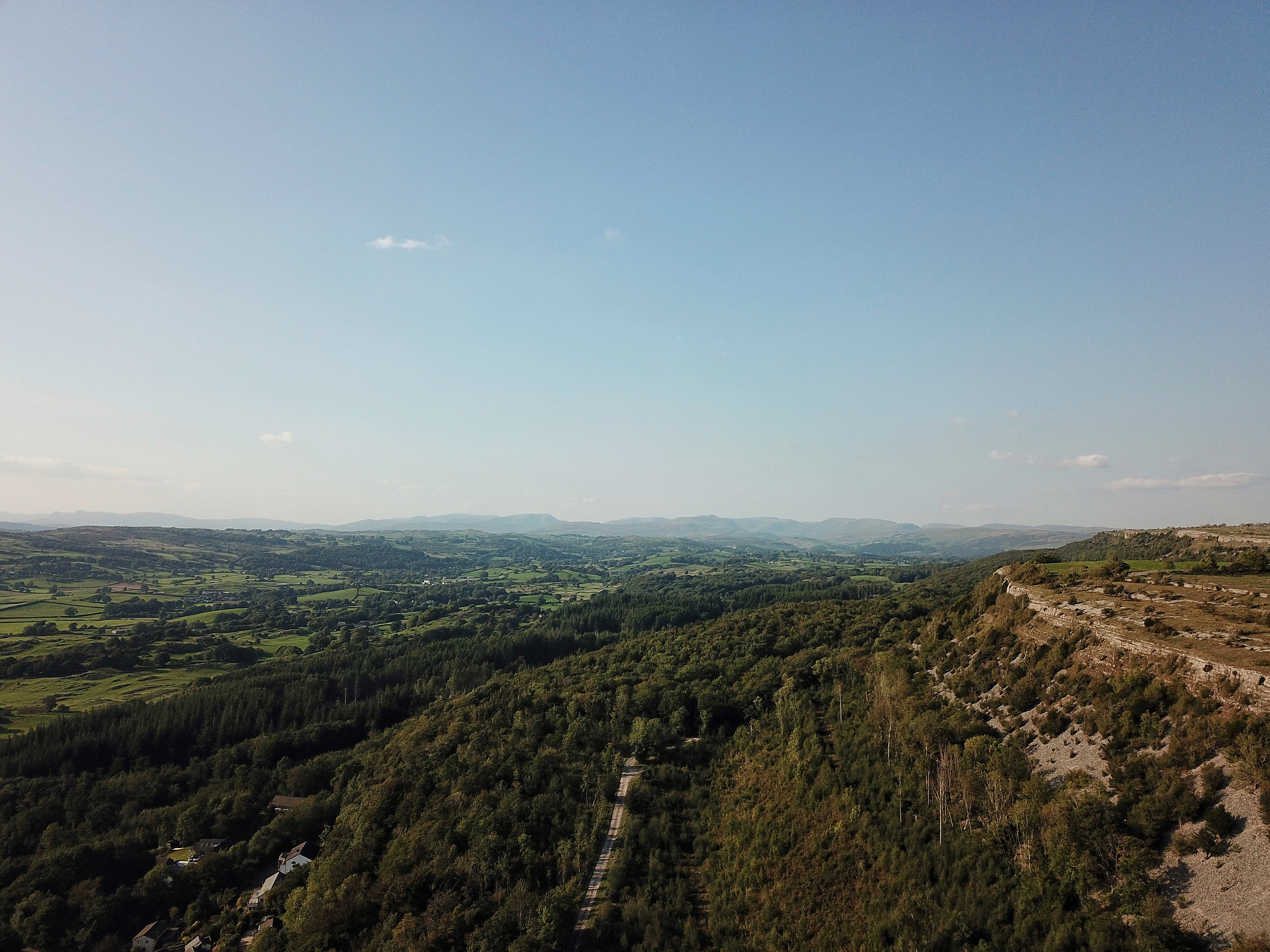
The Lyth Valley, looking north towards the Cumbrian fells, with Scout Scar (right)

The Lyth Valley is on the edge of the Lake District National Park in Cumbria, England. Until 2023, it gave its name to an electoral ward (one of 45 in South Lakeland). As a result of local government reorganisation in Cumbria, since 2023 it is part of the Westmorland and South Lakeland council area.

The valley is a U-shaped valley about 4 miles long and 1.5 miles wide, oriented in a roughly north-south direction. The River Gilpin, a tributary of the River Kent, runs through it, and the A5074 road runs through it from the village of Windermere towards southern destinations. There are no significant settlements in the valley.

The valley is sheltered by limestone hills and enjoys a relatively mild micro-climate for northern England. It is noted for its damson orchards.

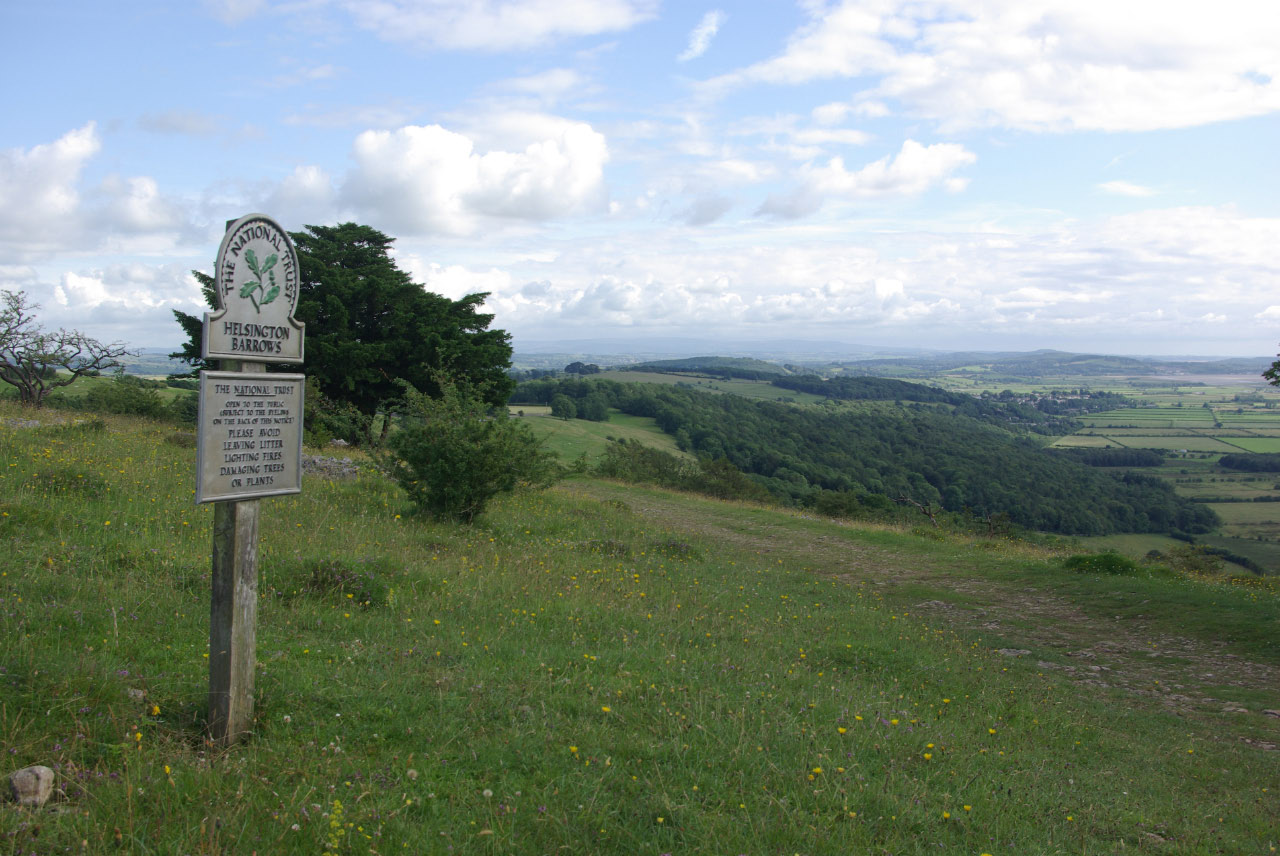
Lyth Valley from Helsington Barrows

== Literary associations ==
- Mrs Humphry Ward in her Helbeck of Bannisdale celebrated the valley in springtime, with its "mists of fruit blossoms. For the damson trees were all out, patterning the valleys".
- Margot Robert Adamson, the Scottish Renaissance poet, wrote of this "Wide silent valley/Beneath whose scree-faced hill the sea birds call".
- Alfred Wainwright maintained that "The supreme joy of the Lyth valley is its annual springtime renewal", with damson blossom "appearing as white puffs of smoke all over the valley".

== Drainage ==
The flat bottom of the valley was bog before being drained for the benefit of farmers. In recent years there has been controversy about the cost of the pumps that keep the valley drained. For some years the pumping has been funded by the Environment Agency, but the Agency decided that its resources would be better deployed in more populated areas of Cumbria. The creation of an Internal drainage board for the valley has been discussed as an alternative. The Agency committed itself to keeping the pumping stations in operation until 2020 to allow more time for a decision on how water level management would be organised in future.

=== Ecological implications ===
There have been objections from environmentalists to a drainage regime that does not take account of the valley's contribution to biodiversity. It is argued that a less intensive drainage scheme would benefit wildlife, and still allow farming or paludiculture.

In 2014 it was reported that 35 ha of wetland habitat was being created in the Lyth Valley on the edge of the Sizergh estate. The project received funding from Natural England as part of a higher level stewardship scheme. It was hoped to attract bittern and other wildlife.
