= River Gilpin =

River in Cumbria, England

Coordinates: 54°15′N 2°48′W

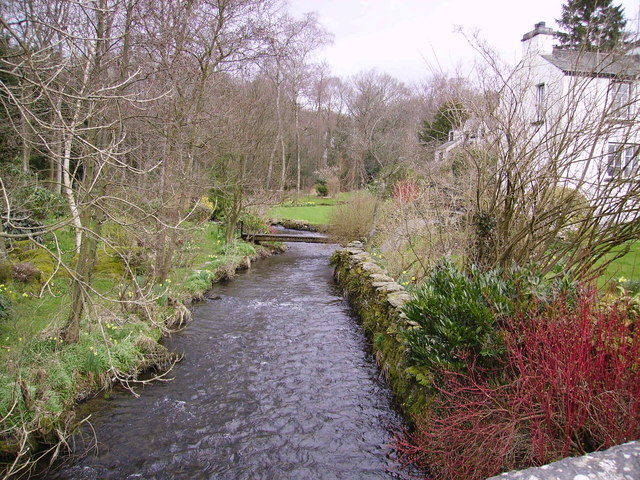
The Gilpin at Crosthwaite

The River Gilpin is a river in the English county of Cumbria. Formerly, the river was in the county of Westmorland.

The river rises near Gilpin Lodge in the vicinity of Bowness-on-Windermere and flows in a general south-by-south-easterly direction through Gilpinpark Plantation.

At Crosthwaite, the direction of the river changes from south to south-east, continuing past the hamlet of Row into the Lyth Valley, where it is swelled by the much larger River Pool.

From there, the river continues moving south to Sampool, where it meets the River Kent.

The name of the river is in honour of the Gilpin family.

== See also ==
- Wild Boar of Westmorland
