= Arnside Bore =

Tidal bore on the estuary of the River Kent in England

Coordinates: 54.200°N 2.841°W

The Arnside Bore is a tidal bore on the estuary of the River Kent in England, United Kingdom.

The bore occurs at high tides, especially spring tides, where the incoming tide of Morecambe Bay narrows into the river estuary, opposite the village of Arnside.

This video size: 360x240 500 kbit/s
Alternative size: 720x480 2000 kbit/s
