= Staveley Mill Yard =

Former mill in Cumbria, England

Coordinates: 54°22′38.24″N 2°48′53.29″W

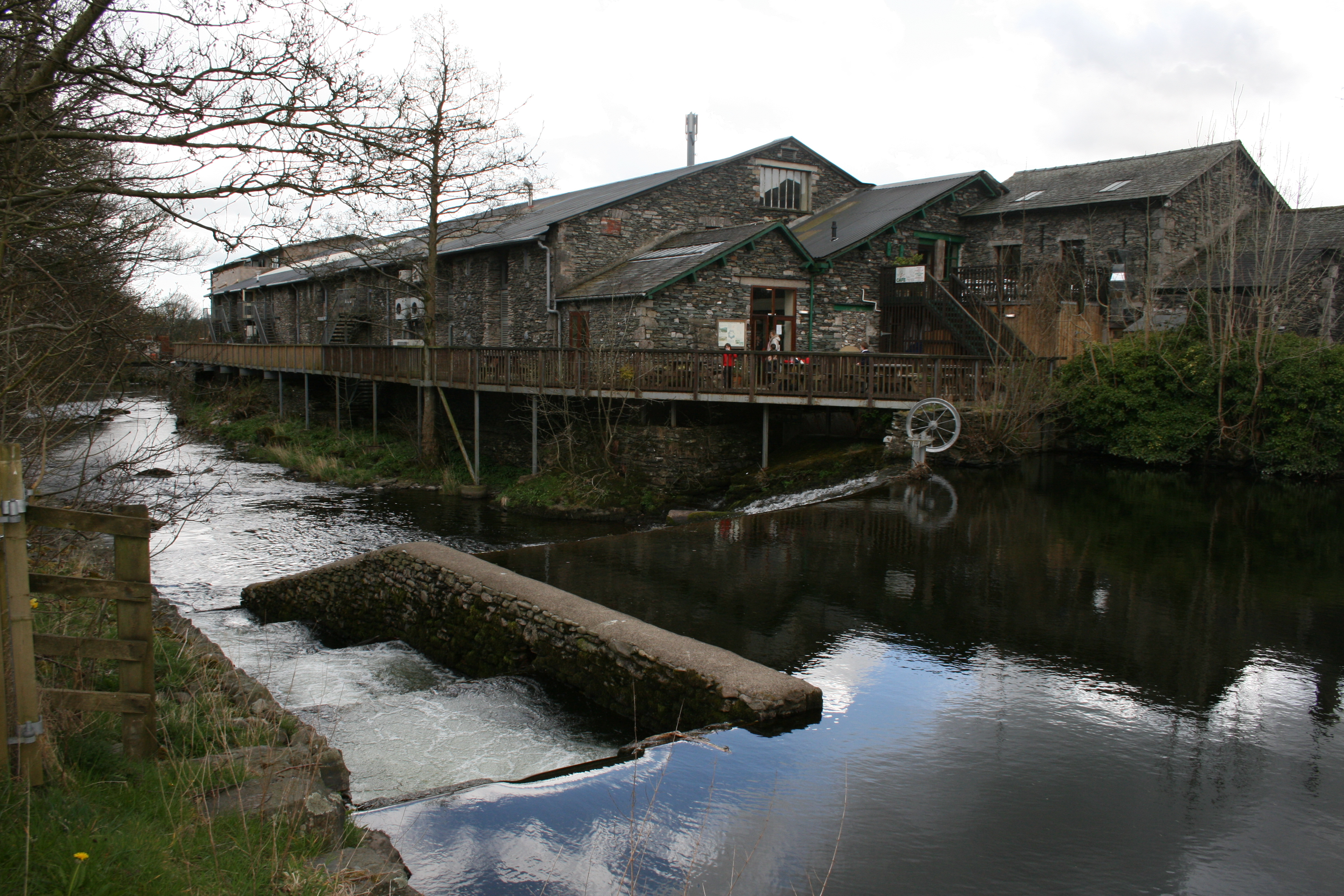
Staveley Mill viewed from the River Kent. Note the fish-pass in the foreground

Staveley Mill Yard is a former bobbin (spool) mill, which is now used for a variety of different local industries, shops and other commercial ventures. It is situated in the centre of the village of Staveley, Cumbria, just off the main street.

== History ==
Staveley Mill was in existence before 1829 and was first known as Low Mill. The first documented owner was Thomas Taylor who was born in Kendal. Taylor (along with two of his daughters) died in 1832 following an outbreak of cholera in the area. The mill was then leased to Benjamin Turton from Yorkshire. In 1850 the mill was sold to Chadwick Bros. of Eagley Mills Bolton. In 1897 Chadwick's Mill was bought by J. P. Coats of Paisley and was later sold to a Mr. Dean in 1900 who renamed it The Staveley Wood Turning Co. Ltd.

Edwin Brockbank, the son of a bobbin turner, became manager of the mill, partner in 1938 and subsequently owner in 1946. Staveley Mill Yard has remained in the Brockbank family for three generations, from Edwin to his son Roger and on to his son David, the present owner.

Kentmere Reservoir, situated north of Staveley beyond Kentmere village, was built by the mill owners to regulate the flow of the river for the benefit of mills and other industries downstream. A large water wheel powered the line shafting (some of which can be seen upstairs in Wilf’s Café) and under the balcony can be seen where the water was drawn off above the weir and channelled along the race, through an archway into the building to power the wheel. In 1902 the water-wheel was replaced by a turbine.

In the 20th century, The Staveley Wood Turning Co. Ltd. switched much of its production into tool handles and was able to prosper despite the introduction of plastic reels and bobbins in the 1950s. Much of the wood used by the wood mills was imported and by the 1990s most of the market was overseas and in 1993-94 the company placed machines overseas in Poland, Sri Lanka and Malaysia. Restructured as the Staveley Timber Company the business was mainly in Europe although some packing and finishing was still carried out in Staveley. Only ten people were then employed in Staveley, so the former coppice drying sheds and timber stores were adapted into light industrial units and shops. When the business finally closed the workers adapted and helped to redevelop the old exhausted mill buildings into more business units. There are now over 30 businesses on the site creating over 200 jobs.

In 2011, a new building development was completed, adding a modern 20,000 Square Foot building to the complex. This building is now used as both offices and industrial units.

A footbridge across the river Kent was replaced in 2011 to improve access for the disabled. This was part of a Lake District National Park project called "Miles without Stiles". The new footbridge was officially opened on 3 June by National Park Chief Executive Richard Leafe and writer and broadcaster Eric Robson.

== Current uses ==
Staveley Mill Yard is currently used for a mixture industry, retail, galleries, creative studios and artisan crafts. Its industries and shops function to service both the local population and further afield and also as an attraction to visitors on their way into the Lake District. It is especially known for Wilf's Cafe and Wheelbase, the UK's largest bike shop. Recent additions also include Hawkshead Brewery (a local real ale microbrewery), The Blind Chocolatier and Staveley Natural Health Centre. It is also known as the site of for art and design studios and also artisan crafts such as furniture and bread.

There is also an emphasis on using natural resources at Staveley Mill Yard. For this reason, the turbine which replaces the original water wheel is now being used to generate 10–15% of the site's energy requirements.
