= Crosthwaite and Lyth =

Civil parish in Cumbria, England

Coordinates: 54.286°N 2.855°W

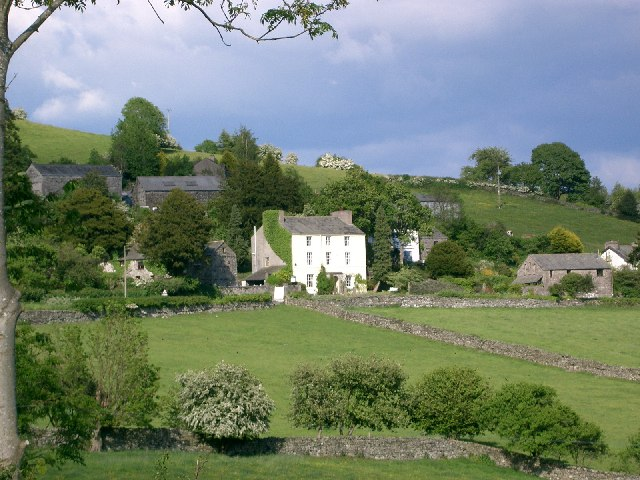
- Crosthwaite House

- Location within Cumbria
- Population: 618 (2011)
- OS grid reference: SD4491
- Civil parish: Crosthwaite and Lyth
- Unitary authority: Westmorland and Furness
- Ceremonial county: Cumbria
- Region: North West
- Country: England
- Sovereign state: United Kingdom
- Post town: KENDAL
- Postcode district: LA8
- Dialling code: 01539
- Police: Cumbria
- Fire: Cumbria
- Ambulance: North West
- UK Parliament: Westmorland and Lonsdale

Crosthwaite and Lyth is a civil parish in the Westmorland and Furness district of Cumbria, England. In the 2001 census the parish had a population of 562, increasing at the 2011 census to 618.

== Governance ==
The village falls in the Lyth Valley electoral ward. This ward stretches south to Morecambe Bay with a total population of 2,180.

== See also ==
- Listed buildings in Crosthwaite and Lyth
- Crosthwaite
