= Little Crosthwaite =

Hamlet in Cumbria, England

Coordinates: 54.637°N 3.187°W

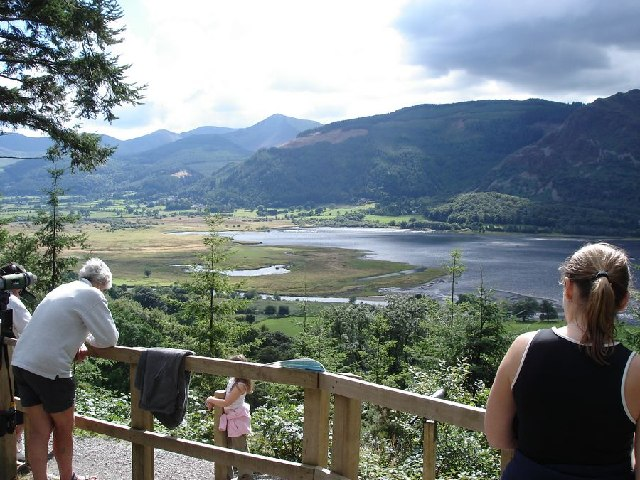
- Osprey Viewpoint

- Location in Allerdale, Cumbria Location within Cumbria
- OS grid reference: NY233275
- Civil parish: Underskiddaw
- Unitary authority: Cumberland
- Ceremonial county: Cumbria
- Region: North West
- Country: England
- Sovereign state: United Kingdom
- Post town: KESWICK
- Postcode district: CA12
- Dialling code: 017687
- Police: Cumbria
- Fire: Cumbria
- Ambulance: North West
- UK Parliament: Penrith and Solway

Little Crosthwaite is a hamlet in the Cumberland district in the English county of Cumbria. It forms part of the civil parish of Underskiddaw.

Little Crosthwaite is located on the A591 road on the eastern shore of the Bassenthwaite Lake between Keswick and Bassenthwaite. The Calvert Trust a charity that provides disability awareness training and adventurous outdoor activities for people with disabilities has its headquarters there.
