= River Kent =

River in Cumbria, England

Coordinates: 54°15′N 2°47′W

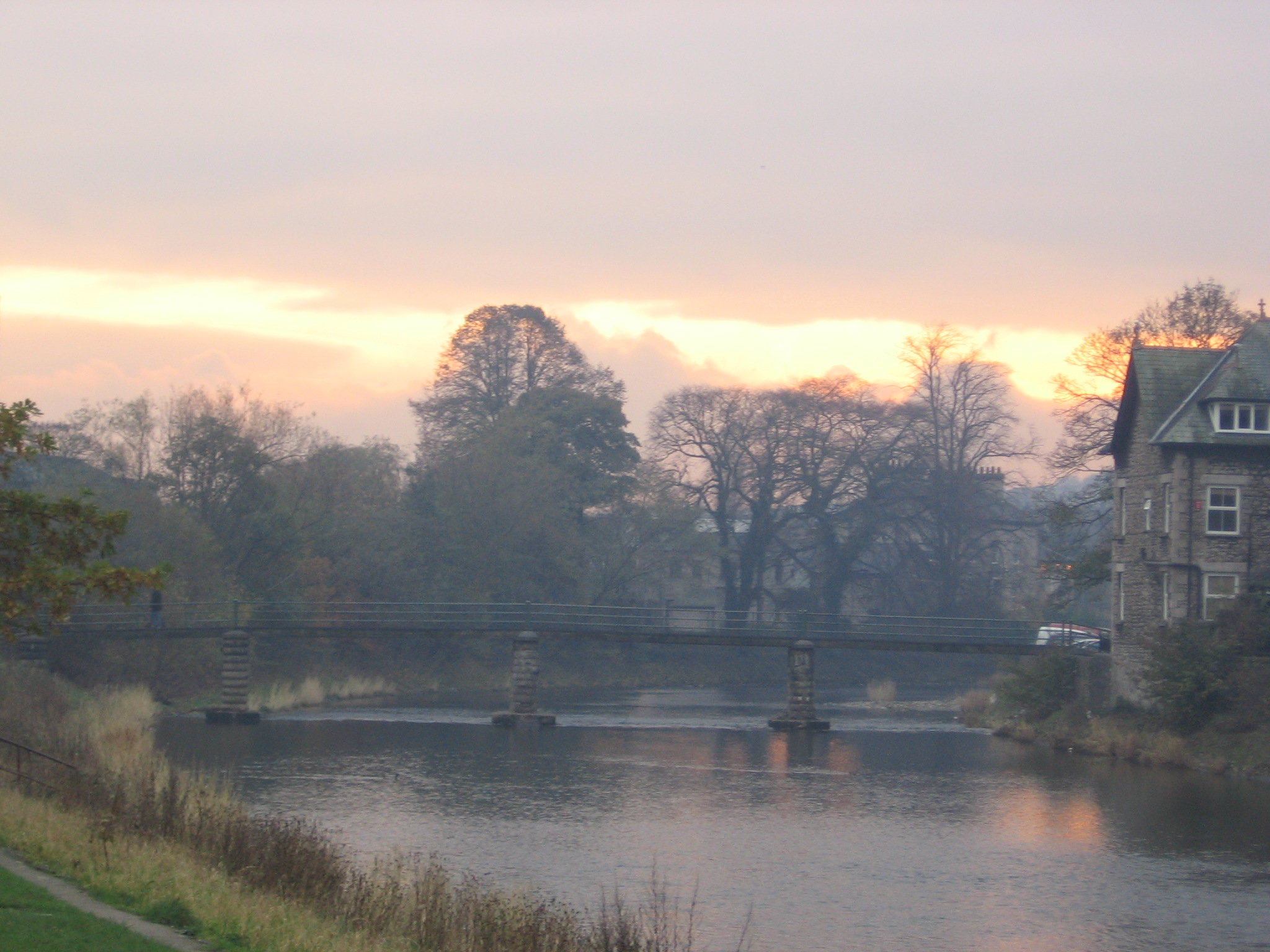
- The River Kent in Kendal

Location
- Country: England
- County: Cumbria; Westmorland (historical)

Physical characteristics
- Source: Hall Cove above Kentmere reservoir
- Mouth: Morecambe Bay
- Length: 32 km (20 mi)
- Discharge
  - location: Sedgwick
  - average: 8.94 m^{3}/s (316 cu ft/s)
  - minimum: 0.47 m^{3}/s (17 cu ft/s)24 August 1984
  - maximum: 441.0 m^{3}/s (15,570 cu ft/s)8 January 2005
- Discharge
  - location: Burneside
  - average: 3.74 m^{3}/s (132 cu ft/s)

Basin features
- Tributaries
  - left: Mint, Sprint, Bela
  - right: Gowan, Gilpin, Winster

River Kent
- IUCN category IV (habitat/species management area)
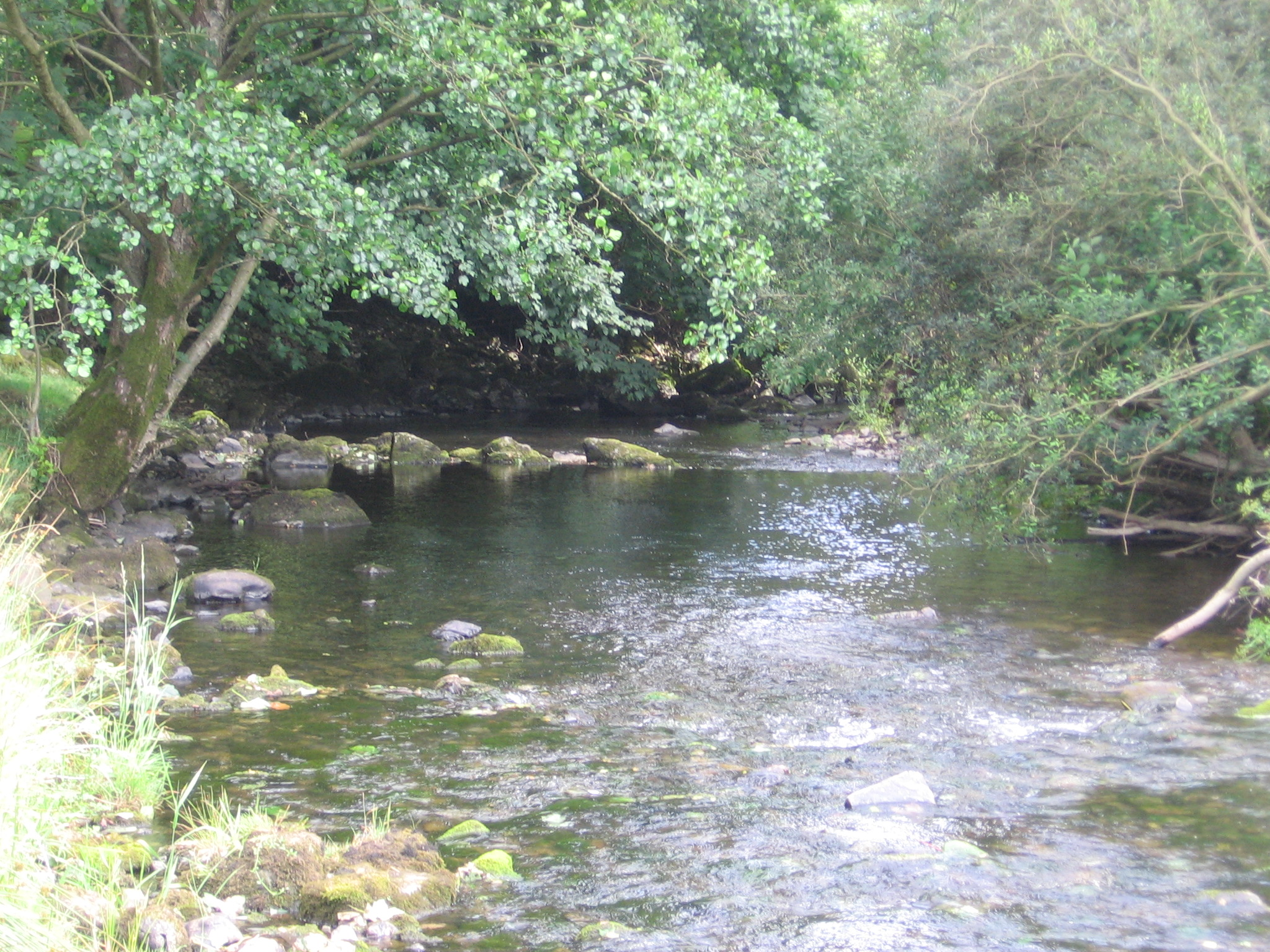
- River Kent near its source in Kentmere
- Interactive map of River Kent
- Area: 109.12 ha (269.6 acres)

The River Kent is a short river in the county of Cumbria in England. It originates in hills surrounding Kentmere, and flows for around 20 miles (32 km) into the north of Morecambe Bay. The upper reaches and the western bank of the estuary are located within the boundaries of the Lake District National Park. The river flows in a generally north to south direction, passing through Kentmere, Staveley, Burneside, Kendal and Sedgwick. Near Sedgwick, the river passes through a rock gorge which produces a number of low waterfalls. This section is popular with kayakers as it offers high quality whitewater for several days after rain. The village of Arnside is situated on the east bank of the Kent estuary, just above Morecambe Bay, and a tidal bore known as the Arnside Bore forms in the estuary at this point on high spring tides.

The river has been used as a source of power since at least the 13th century. In 1848, the construction of Kentmere Reservoir was completed, which was designed to ensure that millers had a more regular supply of water to enable their mills to operate throughout the year. There were corn mills and bobbin mills on the upper river, and the weir from the Staveley mill now supplies water to a turbine which generates electricity for the nearby industrial estate. Below Staveley there were three mills connected with the paper industry, the lower one of which is now the site of the paper manufacturer James Cropper PLC, although the current mill no longer uses water power. Within Kendal, there were mills serving the woollen industry, while the mill at Helsington was the last water-powered snuff mill in the country until its closure in 1991. Below Kendal, there were three mills making gunpowder, and the extensive ruins of New Sedgwick gunpowder mill still lie within the confines of Low Wood caravan park, which is owned by the National Trust.

The river flows through the town of Kendal, which consequently suffers from flooding from time to time. One of the most serious floods was in 1898, but there was also extensive flooding in 1954 and 1968. In the aftermath of the 1968 event, a flood defence scheme was designed by the Lancashire River Authority, and implemented in six stages between 1972 and 1978. A major component of the scheme was the widening and deepening of the river between Nether Bridge and Miller Bridge, requiring the removal of 310 thousand cubic yards (240,000 m^{3}) of spoil, which was reused as the base for a business park. A large lagoon was also constructed to the north of the town to act as a gravel trap. Despite the work, Kendal was again inundated in 2015, when flows in the river far exceeded the design flow of the channel. The Environment Agency published plans for a new set of defences to protect the town in 2018.

The river is a Special Area of Conservation, particularly because it supports populations of the endangered white-clawed crayfish. It also supports populations of three types of game fish, and the upper reaches have become important for the rearing of juvenile salmon since fish passes were constructed to allow fish to negotiate the weirs on the river in 1986.

== Name ==
The origins of the name of the River Kent are uncertain. The name is thought not to belong to the Germanic languages, and therefore to be Brittonic; but a precise etymology has not been identified. (Note: The apparent link to the River Kennet is unlikely to reveal anything about the river's etymology. This is because River Kennet derived its name from Cunetio, a nearby Roman settlement which has been suggested comes from a Brittonic word for 'hound', *cun (c.f Cymraeg (Welsh) ci, cŵn).)

== Course ==
The River Kent rises in the Lake District National Park as a series of streams to the north of the village of Kentmere, which flow rapidly downhill and into the Kentmere Reservoir. The reservoir was completed in 1848, to regulate the flow on the river for the benefit of the mills further downstream. Lingmell Gill rises from similar sources to the east, and flows into the reservoir. The river below the reservoir is supplied from a pipeline through the earth dam, with a controlling valve on the upstream slope of the dam, and when water levels are high, from a spillway at the western edge of the dam. As the river descends toward Kentmere, it is joined by Skeel Gill and Bryant's Gill, Ullstone Gill, Nunnery Beck, Kill Gill and a number of other unnamed tributaries.

The river is crossed by Low Bridge, which carries a minor road to the settlement of Kentmere, and in then joined by Hall Gill. It broadens out as it flows through Kentmere Tarn, which was drained in the early 1840s to provide agricultural land. The draining was a major factor leading to the building of Kentmere Reservoir. Prior to draining, it had provided habitat for algae called diatoms, which formed a layer of diatomite on the bottom of the tarn when they died. From the 1930s until 1971, diatomite was extracted from the former bed, resulting in the tarn returning, although somewhat smaller than it had once been. Below the tarn, the river is joined by Park Beck, flowing from the west. Ullthwaite Bridge carries a minor track over the river, while Scroggs Bridge carries the road to Kentmere. The next bridge is Barley Bridge, above which is Staveley (old) weir, which supplied a corn mill on the east bank and a woollen mill on the west bank. Barley Bridge was built of slate rubble, possibly in the 17th century. It was widened in the 20th century, when the north side was rebuilt in a sympathetic style. The two arches are supported by a central pier, with cutwaters at river level and a pedestrian refuge above the cutwater on the north side. Below the bridge on the west bank is a four-storey mill building dating from the early- to mid-19th century. Staveley Weir is a little further downstream, and powered a bobbin mill; it currently supplies hydroelectric power as part of Staveley Mill Yard. After the river is joined by the River Gowan, it turns to the east, where it leaves the national park, and then to the south-east, to reach Cowan Head, where a large weir supplied a paper mill.

There was a second paper mill at Bowston, with a corresponding weir which was removed in 2022. It was located a little above Bowston Bridge, which has two arches constructed of rough coursed stone. A central pier has cutwaters both upstream and downstream. There is a third paper mill at Burneside. Here the mill was fed by a channel which drove turbines to generate electricity. At the southern edge of the mill, the river was crossed by Burneside Bridge, which was washed away in the floods of December 2015, and was being reconstructed in 2019. Below the bridge, the River Sprint flows over a weir to join the river on the north bank. On the outskirts of Kendal, the river turns to the south and is joined by the River Mint on its east bank. Below the junction, a large lagoon was constructed in the 1970s as part of a flood alleviation scheme. It acts as a gravel trap for gravel carried downstream when there are high flows in either river.

=== Kendal section ===
Within the town, the river is crossed by a bridge carrying the Windermere branch line, three footbridges, and five bridges carrying major roads. Just upstream of the railway bridge is a suspension footbridge, erected in 1993 using parts of the Romney footbridge, which was removed from the south end of the town and replaced by the Romney road bridge at that time. The first road bridge is Victoria Bridge, carrying the A6 road, which is made of iron and was built in 1887 to celebrate Queen Victoria's jubilee.

Next is Stramongate Bridge, with four arches, which dates from 1794, although it includes parts of an earlier bridge dating from the 17th century. A bridge on this site was first documented in 1379, when records mentioned De ponte de Strowmondgate. Stramongate weir is located immediately downstream of the bridge. Gooseholme footbridge was destroyed by floods in 1898, and was rebuilt. It was damaged in December 2015 during flooding, and after an inspection was closed in January 2016 and demolished in September 2019 as it was in a dangerous condition. Plans for a replacement were delayed by uncertainties as to what the Environment Agency were planning to do to improve the flood defences in that area, but it will probably be replaced by a single-span cable stayed bridge, so that its piers will no longer obstruct the river bed.

Miller Bridge carries the A65 road. There was originally a wooden bridge at this location, to connect the town to Castle corn mill, but it was regularly damaged by floods, and was replaced by a stone bridge in 1743. This was in turn replaced by the present bridge, which was designed by the architect Francis Webster to provide easy access to the terminus of the Lancaster Canal, then under construction. The bridge opened in November 1818, with the canal following in June 1819. Jennings Yard footbridge was another casualty of the 1898 floods, and was rebuilt afterward. It was replaced again between 1972 and 1978, as part of a flood alleviation scheme, which involved making the river almost twice as wide at this location.

Parts of Nether Bridge date from the 17th century, but when built, it was quite narrow, and has been widened. The original bridge is on the downstream side. An extension added in 1772 now forms the middle of the bridge, and the upstream side was added in 1908. The three stages are clearly visible within the arches. The final bridge is Romney Bridge, which is of modern construction, and replaced the Romney footbridge. It was built in 1993, and the suspension footbridge was moved to the north of the town at the same time.

=== Lower river ===
After passing Kendal sewage treatment works, on the west bank, the course follows a large meander to the north. The land it surrounds is a scheduled monument, as it was the location of Watercrook Roman fort and civil settlement. Archaeological excavation has revealed that the site was occupied from 90 CE to 369 CE, and the remains are fairly well preserved. Above ground, the site is marked by a number of low earthworks. As the river resumes its southward course, there is a large weir which supplied a snuff mill. The mill is Grade II listed and the snuff grinding equipment is still in situ. To the west of Natland, the river passes through a small limestone gorge, which is crossed by the two-arched Hawes bridge, probably dating from the 18th century, and made of limestone rubble with cut limestone copings.

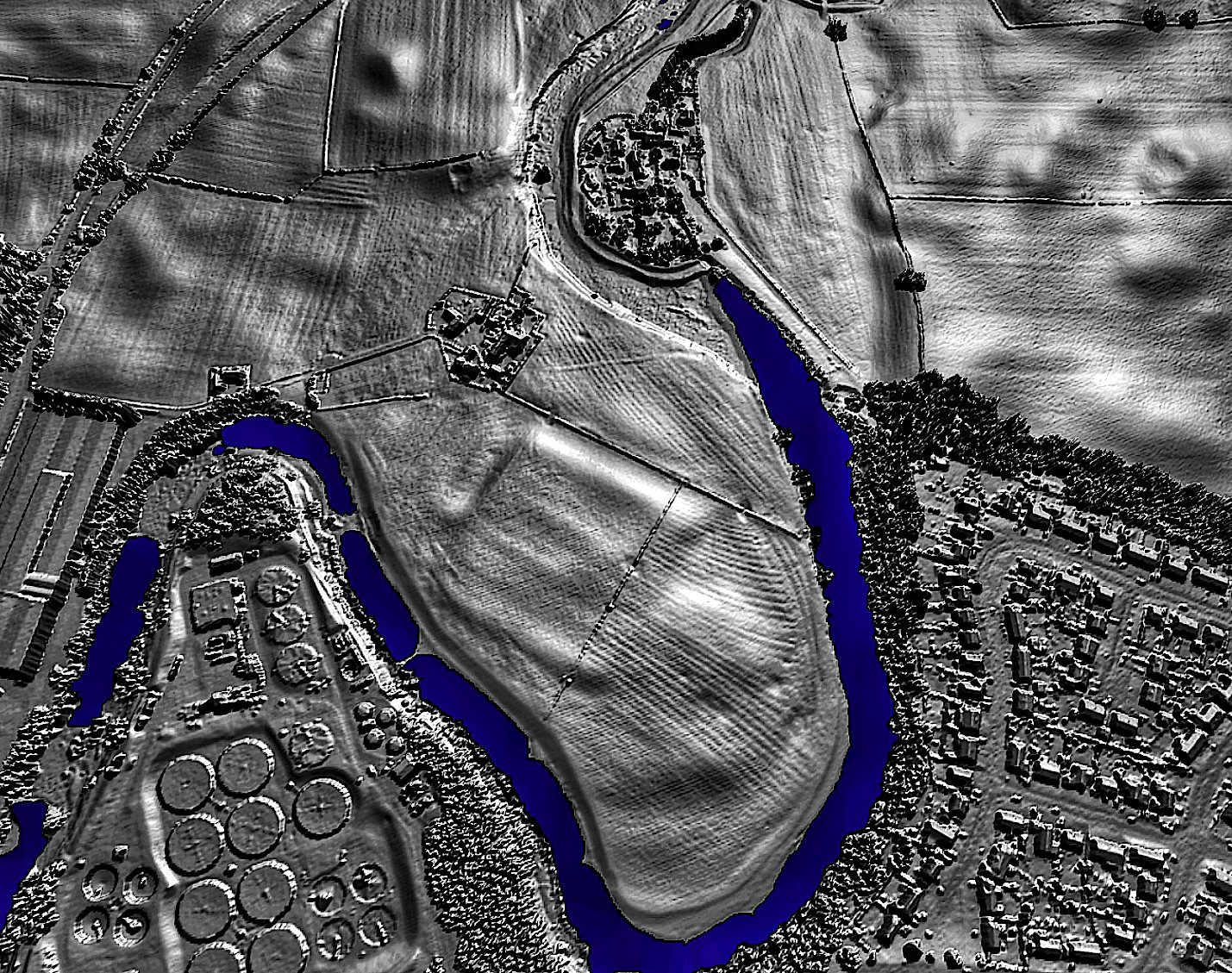
A lidar view of the site of Watercrook Roman fort and settlement.

Below the bridge, woodland on the west bank contains the remains of Sedgwick gunpowder works, fed by a long leat from a dam in the river. After passing under Force Bridge, Sedgwick, on the east bank of the river are the remains of Basingill gunpowder works, which is a scheduled monument. The river turns to the south-west, and is spanned by a much larger bridge carrying the A590 dual carriageway, before it enters Levens Park. As it leaves the park, the A6 road crosses the river on Levens Bridge, dating from the 17th century, although it has been widened subsequently and was rebuilt and repaired during the 18th and 19th centuries.

The river from Kendal to Sedgwick is popular with kayakers, as it contains a number of rapids and drops. It is not a river for beginners, offering whitewater rated at grade 3 with some grade 4 on the International Scale of River Difficulty, and it becomes more challenging as flow rates increase. The white water section ends at Force Falls, just above the A590 bridge at Sedgwick.

The river becomes tidal shortly afterward, as it widens into an estuary. It is joined by the River Gilpin, flowing southward, which forms the boundary of the Lake District National Park in its lower reaches, and the River Bela, flowing westward. The national park boundary then runs along the middle of the river channel. At Arnside, the final bridge is the Furness line railway viaduct. The River Winster flows into the estuary from the north, just before the Kent enters Morecambe Bay, a vast area of intertidal mudflats and sands. The tidal range at the mouth of the river and the shape of the estuary result in a tidal bore occurring near Arnside, which is known as the Arnside Bore. It is usually visible on spring tides, when the tidal range exceeds 31 feet (9.5 m), and is affected by wind direction and recent rainfall. South Lakeland District Council have installed a siren, which is sounded approximately 15 to 20 minutes before the bore is expected to reach Arnside, and again when it actually reaches Blackstone Point, a little further down the estuary.

== History ==
The river has been used to provide water power over a long period. Around 1800, farms around Kentmere, in the upper reaches of the river, were bought by wealthy outsiders, and efforts were made to improve the land for agriculture. Fields were drained by land drains, and around 1840 the Wilsons, who lived at Kentmere Hall, drained Kentmere Tarn, in the hope that it would provide high quality farm land. This was not particularly successful, but had unexpected effects. The water-holding bogs which were drained had previously acted as a giant sponge, soaking up water and releasing it steadily into the river. The flows now fluctuated much more than before, to the detriment of the mills.

In 1844, a scheme to build reservoirs to regulate the flow on the Kent and other rivers was promoted. A committee of ten mill owners plus the major of Kendal was formed, and asked the water engineer John Frederick Bateman to advise on the scheme. A bill was submitted to Parliament, and was signed by Queen Victoria on 21 July 1845. It authorised five reservoirs, but only that at Kentmere Head was built, with work completed in 1848.

In order to pay for the work, and ongoing maintenance, mill owners who benefitted from the scheme were charged a rate, which was based on the amount of fall in levels through the mill site. The amount of power which could be extracted from a given flow is directly proportional to the fall, and this method of charging was agreed to be fair. Only those mills with an annual value of £50 or more were required to pay rates, while corn mills having less than six pairs of stones were excluded from the rating system, as was Barley Bridge Mill at Staveley.

=== Mills ===
The first mill on the river was Low Bridge corn mill at Kentmere. Ullthwaite was another corn mill, located on the west bank of the river. It was fed by a weir running diagonally across the river with a sluice to control flow into a long leat. As roads in the area improved such remove mills became less economic; Low Bridge closed around 1854, and Unthwaite had closed by 1858. Goose Howe or Fell Foot mill was a bobbin mill, with a fall of 14 feet (4.3 m). The weir ran straight across the river and a sluice-controlled flow in a leat on the west bank. In 1875 the tenant was William Philipson, who rented the mill for £135.90, paid a water rate of £99.20 and employed 56 men and boys. The mill was taken over by his son James in 1876, and in 1881 had only 13 employees. The lease ended in 1894 and the owner, Edward Johnson, could not find another tenant, even though he offered to reduce the rent to £35. The Staveley Co-operative Bobbin Manufacturing Company rented the mill from 1896, paying rent of £37.50, but their move from Gatefoot mill was not a success, with the Co-op closing in 1900, and the mill being demolished in 1902.

Scroggs mill at Staveley was situated just below Scroggs bridge, as was the weir, which ran diagonally. The mill was on the east bank, had a fall of 12 feet (3.7 m), and was a bobbin mill in 1844. Ordnance Surveys maps show that it was making pick and hammer shafts in 1898, and was disused in 1914, but did not finally close until 1936. At Barley Bridge, Staveley, there were two mills, one on either side of the river, with a common weir above the bridge and a fall of 16 feet (4.9 m). On the east bank there was a corn mill, while the mill on the west bank was a woollen mill in 1844. It was labelled as a Worsted mill in 1898, and by 1914 was shown as Letterpress Printing. It then became Kentmere Mills, while the 1978 map additionally marked it as producing printed cartons and boxes. Both continued to use water power until 1971. The woollen mill had been bought by Simpson and Ireland in 1834, and they had initially supported the Kentmere Reservoir scheme, but when they realised that they would be paying more than most in rates, due to the fall at their mill being the second highest on the river at the time, they opposed the scheme, and as a consequence, the Act of Parliament which authorised its construction contained a clause limiting their contribution to £15 per year, in order to remove the opposition. Nearer the centre of Staveley was a third mill, known as Staveley Mill in 1844 but shown as Chadwick's Mill on maps. It was a bobbin mill, with a weir at the north end of the main building and a fall of 9 feet (2.7 m). By 1972 it was run by Staveley Wood Turning Co., and was still using water power. The site is now part of Staveley Mill Yard, a business park created in 1995 by David Brockbank, the owner of the mill, whose father installed a second-hand water turbine which generated 25 kW of power for some 50 years. On 1 July 2002, a replacement 100 kW turbine was commissioned, as part of a scheme accredited under the Government's Renewables Obligation.

=== Paper mills ===
The next three mills were all connected with the production of paper. Cowan Head is known to have been the site of a fulling mill in 1735. In 1746 it was bought by a local publisher, Thomas Ashburner, who produced The Kendal Weekly Mercury. He converted it to become a paper mill, which was taken over by James Ashburner and subsequently by the Wilson family. James Cropper rented the mill from the Wilsons in 1845 and bought it outright in 1854. A waterwheel powered the paper making process from 1750, and continued to do so until 1854, when a Thompson’s Patent Vortex Turbine replaced it. This was replaced by two turbines, of 110 hp (82 kW) and 200 hp (150 kW), in the 1930s. The cost of water under the provisions of the Water Resources Act 1963 was prohibitive, and when the company failed to get a reduction in those costs at a public enquiry in the 1970s, they ceased to use water power. They had installed Lancashire boilers in 1899, which continued in use until 1977, when the mill closed. Bowston Mill was probably a fulling mill at one time, but in 1880 it was bought by James Cropper, who constructed a new building. This was used to process rags and ropes, with the resultant pulp supplied to Cowan Head Mill and Burneside Mill. This continued in use until the 1960s, when rags and ropes were replaced by waste paper in the manufacturing process.

At Burneside, records show that there was a corn mill on the river in the 13th century. Later there was also a fulling mill and a sickle mill on the same side of the river, with a fleecing mill on the opposite side. The Wakefield family bought the corn mill and the sickle mill in the 1750s, and John Wakefield added a woollen mill in 1760, which proved to be very profitable. He built a cotton mill in 1770, but changes in the markets made it uneconomic, so it was leased to Hudson and Foster in 1828, who fitted a second-hand paper making machine. James Cropper rented the mill from 1845, but in 1886 it burnt down, and he purchased the site to rebuild the mill. Water powered a 300 hp (220 kW) turbine until about 1970. A steam turbine was installed in 1919, which powered the mill lighting and supplied electricity to the village. It was upgraded several times, and by 1995 Croppers were using a 6.5 Mw gas turbine, with an extra 1 Mw recovered from exhaust gases and a low pressure turbine. To aid transport between the three mills run by Croppers, a narrow gauge tramway was installed in 1879, which was converted to standard gauge in 1927. It linked to the Windermere to Oxenholme line, and ran until 1965. The site is still used to manufacture paper by James Cropper PLC in 2019.

=== Woollen mills ===
Within Kendal, the mills served the woollen industry. Dockray Hall Mill was fed by a large curved dam to the east of the point where Burneside Road crosses under the railway line. The leat, on the west side of the river, passed through the railway viaduct to reach the mill. It was producing dyewood and woollens in the 1700s, and a thick linen cloth called linsey in 1794. A sale notice from 1809 listed four separate mills, one for dying woods, two fulling mills and a friezing mill. The site burnt down in 1824, but was bought by the Gandys, who rebuilt the mills. Carpets were made there from 1850, and the site continued in use until 1940, when parts of it were demolished. Castle Mills was fed from a weir just below Stramongate Bridge, running almost at right angles to the modern weir. The leat curved round to the east, and there was a second weir, parallel to the modern river bank, below Gooseholme foot bridge. The mill was to the south of Bridge Street, and a long tail race rejoined the river below Parr Street. It was built in 1805–06, just to the north of a corn mill and fulling mill, by William Braithwaite and Isaac Wilson. From 1840 it was owned by J J and W Wilson, who introduced steam power in 1850. The mill manufactured travelling rugs, blankers, tweeds, linings and collar checks. It was extended in 1855 when a new water wheel and a beam engine were installed, each rated at 30 hp (22 kW), while further expansion took place in 1872. It employed some 500 people, with water turbines providing power from 1899, but in 1933 the company failed, and was bought by Goodacres, who manufactured carpets there. The site ceased to use water power in 1940.

Somewhere below the Castle Mills site was Kirkbarrow Spinning Mill, which was described as the first in the district in 1798. Low Mills were fred from a weir located where the modern Romney Bridge has been built. The leat ran alongside Natland Road, on the east bank, and the mill buildings were just to the north-east of the sewage treatment works. The mill was quite extensive, as in 1805 it was advertised as having three water wheels, six subsidiary mills, two fulling stocks, one carding engine, and eight friezing engines. John and Thomas Ireland bought the mill and used it to produce horse clothing and collar checks, while by 1848, parts of it were in use by Caleb Metcalf & Sons for producing woollens. Disaster struck in 1891, when it burnt down, but Richardson & Co rebuilt it, and it produced woollens from 1900 until it closed in 1924.

=== Snuff and gunpowder mills ===
Immediately after the long loop of the river that enclosed the Concangium Roman station, a long weir fed a leat to the west of the river, which fed mills at Helsington Laithes. A local architect called Francis Webster rented the site from the Lord of the Manor in about 1800, and built a weir and two water mills. It was known as a marble works, but the largest mill was used to polish local limestone for ornamental use, and the smaller mill was a saw mill. The works employed three local people between 1841 and 1861. J Chaplow and Sons used the larger building as a workshop after they bought it in 1895, and were described as "haulage contractors, threshing machine proprietors and furniture removers" in 1905. They maintained traction engines and other machinery in the mill building. THe water wheel remained in use, generating electricity until the 1940s, but was subsequently dismantled. Chaplows were still using the site in 2013 as a base for a tarmacking business. The smaller of the two mills was sold to Gawith, Hoggarth & Co around 1880, who used it to manufacture snuff. From at least 1973 it was the last water-powered snuff mill in Britain. Apart from the addition of an electric hammer mill in 1980 to increase production, the process continued almost unchanged until 1991, when the mill was sold and converted into a house.

There were two gunpowder mills at Sedgwick, both producing gunpowder for the civilian market rather than for the military. Old Sedgwick Mill was the first of seven gunpowder mills in South Cumbria, and was started by John Wakefield. The site covered 4.9 acres (2.0 ha), and although it is believed to have opened in 1764, research by English Heritage in 2002 suggested that it was not built before 1768 and probably did not start producing gunpowder until 1770. The Wakefields worked hard to ensure that the Lancaster Canal extension to Kendal would be routed close to their works, and had a dedicated wharf on the canal at Sedgwick. The site was located on the east bank of the river, below the suspension footbridge, and a fall of 10 feet (3.0 m) in the river level provided the power for its mills. Wakefields moved to a new site at Gatebeck on the Peasey Beck in 1850, which had more fall, and where flows were augmented by compensation water from Killington Reservoir, which supplied the Lancaster Canal. The buildings beside the Kent were demolished between 1850 and 1854. In 1857, Walter Charles Strickland set up a new company which built the New Sedgwick Works on the west bank of the river. It covered some 27 acres (11 ha), and was fed from a weir originally built straight across the river, but subsequently reconstructed in a triangular shape. A long stone-lined channel ran through the woods to power water wheels and turbines at the main works. Strickland's company failed in 1864, but it was reconstructed as the Sedgwick Gunpowder Company. From 1886, Henry Swinglehurst was the director of the company, which became a private limited company in 1896, when he died and his son Addison took over. Explosive Trades Ltd bought the business in 1917, and they became part of Nobel Industries Ltd in 1920. ICI became the parent company in 1926, but falling orders led to its closure in 1935.

After closure, many of the buildings were burnt or demolished to ensure there were no traces of explosive left. The site was reused during the Second World War for the storage of ammunition, and ownership passed to the National Trust in 1950, when they acquired Sizergh Castle and its grounds. The site was altered in 1977, when Low Wood Caravan Park was established, but it remains one of the best-preserved gunpowder works in the north. Among the caravans, the remains of nine incorporating mills, some corning mills, an engine house, a dusting house, glaze houses, stove houses, a press house, a pump house, a boiler station, a saltpetre refinery, stables and a joiner's shop, and much of the water management system which supplied waterwheels and a water turbine, can still be found. The site is an ancient monument while some of the detached buildings are grade II listed. The final mill was Basin Ghyll or Basingill Mill, which was located below Force Bridge at Sedgwick. It was located on the east bank of the river, and was unusual, in that it was not a complete gunpowder works. It was built in 1790 to supplement the incorporating mills at Old Sedgwick gunpowder works. When that closed in 1850, and operation moved to Gatebeck, Basin Ghyll supplemented the incorporating mills at Gatebeck. It closed in 1935, after which all the wooden-framed mill buildings were burned to remove explosives, leaving the stone blast walls. There was a waterwheel at the north end of the site, and a tunnel which carried water downstream to further mills and a second waterwheel. Most of the basic structures and the water system survive.

=== Hydro power ===
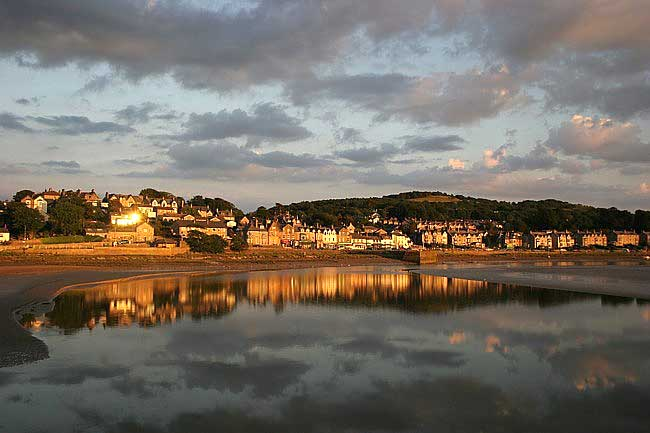
Arnside, on the Kent estuary

In addition to the Staveley Mill Yard hydro-electric scheme, there have been other proposals to use the Kent to provide hydro power. In 2009 the residents of Kentmere proposed the construction of a small system, utilising a section of the river just above Low Bridge, where it drops some 130 feet (40 m) over a distance of 1,150 feet (350 m) at Jumb Falls. The scheme would have generated 1,250 MWh of electricity per year, which would have been sold to the national grid, with the profits used to fund community projects once the capital costs were repaid. A Trust was set up to manage the scheme, and a planning application was submitted to the Lake District National Park Authority in August 2009. Consent for the scheme was granted in July 2010. Because the scheme was a run-of-river scheme, the decision to sell the electricity rather than distribute it locally was taken because varying flows would have resulted in variable amounts of power being generated. Incidentally, the location plan, which was one of the documents submitted with the application, shows an old mill, which was presumably Low Bridge Mill, near the proposed location for the turbine house. For reasons that are not altogether clear, the scheme did not progress any further, and the Trust was disbanded in March 2011.

=== Flood defence ===
Kendal's location on the banks of the River Kent has made it liable to flooding from high river levels. The highest known level was recorded in 1898, but on 2 December 1954, the highest level of flood water since that time was recorded. Some 39 acres (15.8 ha) of land in and around the town were under water, with nearly 300 houses inundated. At its peak, 9,900 cubic feet (280 m^{3}) of water per second were flowing down the river. Kendal again suffered from flooding in 1968, and the Lancashire River Authority, who had responsibility for the river, implemented a flood defence scheme. It was designed to cope with flows up to the maximum experienced in 1954 without the town flooding, and was constructed in six phases between 1972 and 1978 at a cost of £1 million.

The scheme affected 3.5 miles (5.6 km) of the river, from Mintsfeet in the north to Watercrook in the south. The river channel was made wider, with the width of the section between Nether Bridge and Miller Bridge being increased from 66 feet (20 m) to 125 feet (38 m). The depth of the channel was also increased in places, and a total of 310 thousand cubic yards (240,000 m^{3}) of spoil was removed, which was reused to construct the base of a business park on the south side of Kendal. The deeper channel meant that the foundations of existing river walls and bridges had to be protected against erosion. Walls were protected by building concrete buttressing in front of them, which was then faced with stone. Some of the widened sections needed new walls, and some of the banks were protected by limestone blocks. 1.24 miles (2 km) of buttressing and 1.05 miles (1.7 km) of new walls were required to complete the scheme. Jennings Yard footbridge had to be replaced because the river was so much wider at that point, and in order to prevent the river drying out when flows were low, a series of low weirs were built through the town. Earth embankments were constructed to protect Mintsfeet and Helsington, where an automatic flood gate was also required, to prevent floodwater breaching the defences through the leat to Helsington Mill.

During times of high flow, the river moves large volumes of gravel downstream, which is then deposited as the river slows. In order to prevent this clogging the town section, a large lagoon was built just below the confluence of the River Kent and the River Mint. This acts as a gravel trap, enabling the gravel to be removed at regular intervals more easily than if it was spread throughout the town section. The effectiveness of the new defences were tested in 1985, when a flood of the same magnitude as that in 1954 passed through the town without overtopping any of the defences. Parts of Mintsfeet were affected by flooding from the river in February 2004 and January 2005. As well as houses being inundated, business properties on the Lake District Business Park and the Mintsfeet Industrial Estate were also flooded. Flood embankments had been built to protect the industrial areas from the two rivers in the 1980s, and these were improved after they failed to stop flooding in 2004 and 2005.

In December 2015, much of Cumbria and north-west England experienced extreme levels of rainfall, caused by Storm Desmond. The Kent catchment was already saturated, and so the rain quickly made its way into the river systems. In Kendal, the Kent and the River Mint both overtopped their east banks. Flows on the River Kent are measured by gauging stations at Bowston, Victoria Bridge in Kendal, and Sedgwick. The peak flow recorded at Victoria Bridge during the flood event of 5 December and 6 December was 14,220 cubic feet (403 m^{3}) per second, far in excess of the design flow of 9,900 cubic feet (280 m^{3}) per second for the river channel through Kendal. However, this was not an accurate measurement, since water which flowed over the bank in the Mintsfeet area was constrained by the Oxenhope to Windermere railway embankment, and combined with the flood waters of Stock Beck flowed back under the railway where it crosses the A6 road, thus rejoining the river below the Victoria Bridge gauging station. Peak flows downstream at Sedgwick were 18,600 cubic feet (526.8 m^{3}) per second.

Nearly 2,150 properties in the town were flooded as a result of the highest river levels ever recorded. The areas most affected were Mintsfeet and Sandylands. At the southern end of the town, the sewage treatment works was inundated, and the water caused serious damage to its main outfall. Properties at Helsington Mills were also flooded, with water levels of up to 4 feet (1.2 m). Once the water had subsided, 7,000 tonnes of gravel were removed from the gravel trap, a further 7,000 tonnes from Gooseholme and 3,000 tonnes from near Romney Bridge. Smaller amounts were removed from other locations in the summer. In November 2018, the Environment Agency submitted plans for the first phase of a £30 million scheme to improve flood defences in Kendal. This involves the construction of flood gates, flood walls and a pumping station at Gooseholme. As a result of public consultation, plans for flood walls near Abbot Hall Art Gallery and Kendal Parish Church had been modified to be less intrusive.

To complement these engineering solutions, some more natural flood management techniques are being trialled. In 2020 work began on a small demonstration project at Town View Fields, a park in central Kendal. The work involved replacing around 100 yards (90 m) of stone culvert carrying Dyers Beck with a meandering channel, running into a small wetland area. This slows the release of water at times of high flow into the main river system. The project, which was implemented by South Cumbria Rivers Trust, was the first urban daylighting scheme undertaken by the Trust, although they have previously implemented rural schemes. Most of the funding came from DEFRA's Natural Flood Management programme.

== Wildlife ==
The river is a designated Special Area of Conservation, covering 269.6 acres (109.12 ha), primarily as an important habitat for the endangered White-clawed Crayfish (Austropotamobius pallipes). This species is prolific, particularly in some of the tributaries of the Kent, where it exists in densities higher than almost anywhere else in England. The river is also an important site for bullhead and the endangered freshwater pearl mussel. It is a designated watercourse of plain to montane levels, which means that it is characterised by populations of water-crowfoot and water starwort, which can form floating mats of white flowers in the summer. These mats provide food and shelter for fish and invertebrates.

There are significant quantities of three types of game fish in the river, salmon, brown trout and sea trout. Fishing on a stretch of 8 miles (13 km) around Kendal is controlled by the Kent Angling Association, which was formed in 1848. In 1986 fish ladders were constructed alongside the dams of mill-ponds to allow migratory fish to reach the upper sections of the river. Salmon in particular were quick to utilise the breeding grounds that then became available and the river above Bowston has become important for the rearing of juvenile salmon. Notwithstanding the existence of fish ladders, the removal of some weirs would arguably be beneficial to the health of the river and fish stocks in particular. In 2022 approval was given for the removal of a 19th century weir at Bowston.

Since 1989, there has been a fish counter at Basinghyll, which covers the whole width of the river. Until 2000, it could detect any fish passing through the counter, and their direction of travel, but could not detect the species of individual fish. At that time, the Environment Agency were hoping to use underwater cameras to record the species of the fish. In 2013 DEFRA funding was announced for eel passes at Stramongate weir in Kendal and Basinghyll fish counter, where two eel passes were installed in July 2013.

== Water quality ==
The Environment Agency measure the water quality of the river systems in England. Each is given an overall ecological status, which may be one of five levels: high, good, moderate, poor and bad. There are several components that are used to determine this, including biological status, which looks at the quantity and varieties of invertebrates, angiosperms and fish. Chemical status, which compares the concentrations of various chemicals against known safe concentrations, is rated good or fail.

The water quality of the River Kent system was as follows in 2019.

Section	Ecological Status	Chemical Status	Length	Catchment	Channel
Kent - headwaters to conf Gowan	Good	Fail	7.8 miles (12.6 km)	15.55 square miles (40.3 km^{2})	
Kent - conf Gowan to conf Sprint	Good	Fail	4.1 miles (6.6 km)	7.16 square miles (18.5 km^{2})	
Kent - conf Sprint to tidal	Good	Fail	13.0 miles (20.9 km)	20.05 square miles (51.9 km^{2})	
Kent estuary	Bad	Fail			heavily modified

Like most rivers in the UK, the chemical status changed from good to fail in 2019, due to the presence of polybrominated diphenyl ethers (PBDE), perfluorooctane sulphonate (PFOS) and mercury compounds, none of which had previously been included in the assessment.

Projects have been undertaken to improve the water quality, for example on the River Gowan, a tributary which has been reconnected to its flood-plain. Some of these projects are also intended to help control flooding by natural means.

== Bibliography ==
- Cleo (2018). "Flooding and Flood Alleviation". Cumbria and Lancashire Education Online. Archived from the original on 1 May 2019.
- Hutt, Duncan (1995). "James Cropper Plc – the development of a modern paper manufacturer (excerpt)". Industrial History of Cumbria. North West Mills Group. Archived from the original on 15 April 2017.
- IHC (12 February 2016). "Woollen Mills". Industrial History of Cumbria. Archived from the original on 7 May 2019.
- Jecock, Marcus; Dunn, Christopher (2002). "Old Sedgwick Gunpowder Works Cumbria". English Heritage. ISSN 1478-7008.
- Johnston, I W. "A Brief History of Kentmere" (PDF). kentmere.org. Archived (PDF) from the original on 28 April 2019.
- Nicholls, Arthur R (2015). "Looking back at the great Kendal flood of 1898". The Westmorland Gazette. Archived from the original on 1 May 2019.
- Nicholson, Savannah (31 July 2020). "Natural flood management project to begin at cherished Kendal park". Westmoreland Gazette. Archived from the original on 14 August 2020.
- Rose, Sarah (23 January 2015). "Draft parish/township histories: Helsington" (PDF). Victoria County History of Cumbria Project. Archived (PDF) from the original on 8 May 2019.
- SAP (July 2000). "Salmon Action Plan Consultation - River Kent" (PDF). Environment Agency. Archived (PDF) from the original on 3 November 2018.
- Scott, Joe (October 2003). "The Kentmere Reservoir and local Water Mills" (PDF). Staveley & District History Society. Archived (PDF) from the original on 2 May 2019.
- Smithers, Rebecca (11 August 2013). "European eels get a second chance at survival in UK rivers". The Guardian. Archived from the original on 12 August 2013.
- Stewart, Natalie (25 December 2009). "Community hydro power scheme planned for Lake District village". Westmorland Gazette. Archived from the original on 8 May 2019.
- Teasdale, Jason (2006). "Weir-ed and Wonderful" (PDF). Mersey Basin Campaign. Archived (PDF) from the original on 3 May 2019.
- Webborn, David (5 July 2016). "Kendal Flood Investigation Report" (PDF). Environment Agenct; Cumbria County Council. Archived (PDF) from the original on 4 August 2016.
- Wilson, Paul N (1973). "Kendal Reservoirs" (PDF). Transactions of the CWAAS. pp. 325–347. Archived (PDF) from the original on 28 April 2019 – via Archaeology Data Service.
