= Hugo Crosthwaite =

American artist (born 1977)

- Born: 1971 (age 54–55); Tijuana, Mexico
- Education: San Diego State University
- Known for: Drawing, painting, stop-motion animation, murals
- Awards: Grand Prize at the 11th FEMSA Monterrey Biennial, Outwin Boochever Portrait Competition
- Website: https://www.hugocrosthwaite.com/

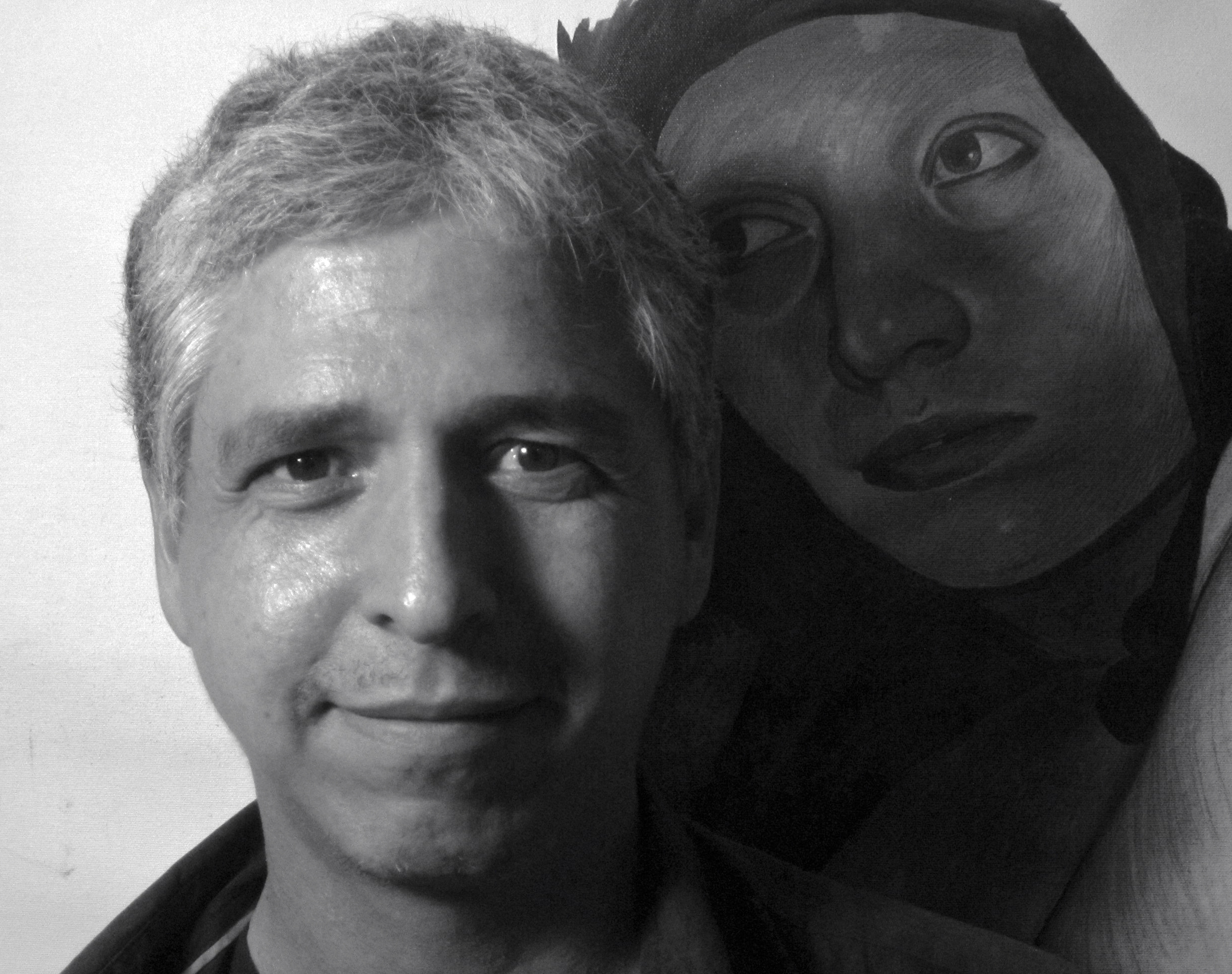
Portrait of the artist Hugo Crosthwaite

Hugo Crosthwaite (born 1971) is a Tijuana-born contemporary artist whose work encompasses black and white graphite and charcoal drawings, stop-motion animations, paintings, and large-scale murals. His artwork is improvisational, emerging from his portrait-drawing practice that often relies on his observations of real people in Tijuana. Crosthwaite's artwork combines portraiture, art historical references, comic book references, urban signage, commercial facades, and mythology to create layered compositions that comment on life in the border regions of San Diego/Tijuana. Crosthwaite’s work is included in the permanent collections of the Smithsonian National Portrait Gallery (United States), Morgan Library & Museum, Los Angeles County Museum of Art, Museum of Contemporary Art San Diego, the National Museum of Mexican Art, Museum of Latin American Art, the FEMSA Collection, Mexico City and private collections in the U.S. and around the world. In 2019, Crosthwaite won first prize in the Smithsonian's National Portrait Gallery Outwin Boochever Portrait Competition for his submission of a stop-motion animated video entitled A Portrait of Berenice Sarmiento Chavez. He was subsequently awarded a commission for a stop motion portrait of Dr. Anthony Fauci in 2022, which the National Portrait Gallery debuted in 2022.

== Early life and education ==
=== Early years and education ===
Crosthwaite was born in 1971 in Tijuana, Baja California, Mexico, and grew up in the tourist town of Rosarito, where his parents owned a curio shop. His experience working in the shop throughout his childhood inspired later artworks. In interviews, he has noted that while working in the curio shop, he practiced selling the idea of Tijuana and the idea of Mexico to U.S. American tourists, even if this idea did not reflect the reality of the city. As a child salesperson, he told stories about items in the shop in order to make a profit, noting that U.S. American tourists were eager to accept the exoticized, unrealistic, or false narratives about the souvenirs they were buying. This practice of storytelling sparked Crosthwaite’s creative interest and narrative impulse. In a 2015 interview with the Los Angeles Times, he explained that the shop was an "organized mess," with every corner filled with curiosities for sale. He said, “That’s what Tijuana is. At first impression, it looks chaotic. But it has an order to it.” Crosthwaite identifies working in the curio shop and growing up in the frenetic urban landscape of Tijuana are foundational forces in his art.

He was raised as a Roman Catholic and has revealed that his mother wished that he and his two brothers to become priests. One of Crosthwaite's brothers ultimately joined the Dominican Order and currently teaches at the Angelicum School in Rome. Though Crosthwaite did not enter a religious life, elements of his Catholic upbringing pervade his artwork. In 1997, Crosthwaite graduated from San Diego State University with a B.A. in Applied Arts and Sciences. He lives and works between San Diego, USA and Rosarito, Mexico.

== Career ==
=== Awards ===
In 2014, Crosthwaite was awarded the Grand Prize at the 11th FEMSA Monterrey Biennial. The winning work was titled Tijuana Radiant Shine No. 1, graphite and acrylic paint on panel, and measured 31 x 61 inches (79 x 176 cm). In 2019, Crosthwaite won first prize in the Smithsonian's National Portrait Gallery Outwin Boochever Portrait Competition for his submission of a stop-motion animated video entitled A Portrait of Berenice Sarmiento Chavez. He was subsequently awarded with doing a portrait drawing of Dr. Anthony Fauci in 2022, which he also completed through the medium of stop-motion animation, with accompanying drawings.

=== Permanent collections ===
Crosthwaite’s work is included in the following permanent collections: the Smithsonian National Portrait Gallery, Washington, D.C.; Morgan Library and Museum, New York; Los Angeles County Museum of Art; Orange County Museum of Art, Newport Beach, CA; Museum of Contemporary Art, San Diego, CA; San Diego Museum of Art, CA; Museum of Latin American Art, Long Beach, CA; Boca Raton Museum of Art, FL; the National Museum of Mexican Art, Chicago, IL; University of Arkansas Art Gallery, Little Rock, AR; FEMSA Collection, Mexico; CECUT/Centro Cultural Tijuana, Mexico; and private collections in the U.S. and around the world. Crosthwaite has been represented by the Luis de Jesus Los Angeles gallery since 2012.

== Artwork ==
=== Early work ===
Crosthwaite's first solo exhibition in the U.S. was in 2001, at Galerie D’Art International in Solana Beach, California. Later that year, Crosthwaite exhibited his work alongside eight other artists from Tijuana in the show PinturaFresca (Wet Paint) organized by Luis Ituarte at the Luckman Gallery at Cal State Los Angeles. Crosthwaite’s work for this exhibition was entitled Tablas de Novena, and illustrated a series of human nudes undergoing judgment, inspired by scenes from Dante’s Divine Comedy. Crosthwaite encounter the Divine Comedy as a child through the engravings of the French artist and illustrator Gustave Doré in an edition of The Divine Comedy owned by his father. Art critic and feature writer Holly Meyers cited Crothewaite's nine-part series for PinturaFresca (Wet Paint), which depicted Christian themes of paradise, judgment, and purgatory, as among the most powerful works in the show. She describes the series as “dark, deep, heartfelt works that tower over the rest of the show like a daunting spiritual conscience."

In 2010, after reading a review of Crosthwaite's work written by Leah Ollman for Art in America, collector Richard Harris commissioned Crosthwaite to create a monumental work for his collection, Morbid Curiosity: The Richard Harris Collection. The 25 x 11 foot graphite on board drawing, Death March, was exhibited at the Chicago Cultural Center in 2012. Death March depicts a funerary procession and Day of the Dead celebration, referencing engravings by nineteenth-century Mexican graphic artist José Guadalupe Posada, Skeletons Fighting for the Body of a Hanged Man by James Ensor, and The Triumph of Death by Pieter Bruegel the Elder.

== Solo exhibitions ==
=== Tijuanerias, 2012 ===
In 2012, Luis De Jesus Los Angeles mounted a solo exhibition, Tijuanerias, consisting of 102 drawings and installation, which explores the “Black Legend”. As a result of the show, the Los Angeles County Museum of Art acquired ten of Crosthwaite's drawings. Also in 2012, Crosthwaite's work Bartolomé, purchased by the San Diego Museum of Art, was included in Behold, America!, a collaborative exhibition which presents art of the United States from three San Diego museums, at The San Diego Museum of Art. Tijuanerias was a series of 102 ink and wash drawings that depicted Crosthwaite’s satirical interpretation of Tijuana’s Leyenda Negra (“Black Legend”), the stigma of social perversion and vice that has surrounded Tijuana since the 1920s. The drawings feature prostitutes, madmen, and addicts surrounded by drug violence, murder, and narco wealth, waiting to cross over a socio-political border, almost as if Tijuana is purgatory. In his artist statement, Crosthwaite described his renderings of Tijuana as, “Horribly real, humorously weird and often bizarre,” adding that, “there is [in Tijuana] a complicity and an acceptance that one can grow accustomed to anything as long as there is a deal to make and money to be made.” The cartoons took inspiration from Francisco Goya’s Los caprichos as well as modern street art and graffiti iconography. Tijuanerias was Crosthwaite's second exhibition at the Luis de Jesus Gallery in Los Angeles, which marked the beginning of a long period of collaboration between Crosthwaite and the gallery.

=== CARPAS, 2013 ===
In 2013, Crosthwaite was chosen to represent Mexico in the California-Pacific Triennial curated by Dan Cameron at the Orange County Museum of Art. The exhibition was on view from June 30 - November 17, 2013. CARPAS was a set of 26 studies that Crosthwaite sketched in preparation for the California-Pacific Triennial. Of the 26 studies, three of them went on display at the Triennial, as well as a wall mural. Carpas (the Spanish word for tent) refers to groups of travelling entertainers who performed in the 1920s-30s across Mexico and the southwestern United States, using collapsible stages and carpas to move from town to town and present programs. The central figure in carpa theater performances was called the pelado, a common person who would perform improvised satires about politics or the economy to a mixed-class audience.

The 12 x 9 foot canvases captured audiences at the Triennial. A playful combination of “nariz” (Spanish for “nose) and Arizona, La Narizona is a sketch featuring a woman with a nose extending out from her face like Pinocchio. KCRW writer Hunter Drohojowska-Brewer wrote that, “…this fearsome lady is a border patrol officer outfitted in a bikini with a face resembling that of Arizona governor Jan Brewer.” The central sketch, Miss Bala, features a young girl with a sash on and large tiara hanging over her head. A poster falls off of the wall in the background as she perches on top of a crowd of warring gunmen. The Daily Pilot reported that the image had been inspired by the true story of a beauty queen in Tijuana whose pageant was funded by drug dealers. The set of studies, drawing on real life narratives related to border communities and issues, featured the sort of political satire that had come to be characteristic of Crosthwaite’s work at this point in his career.

In 2013, Crosthwaite's work was also included in the Wignall Museum of Contemporary Art’s The New World curated by Roman Stollenwerk, for which he created a 42-foot mural titled Guadalupana March.

=== Tijuana Radiant Shine, 2014 ===
Tijuana Radiant Shine is a series of 14 mixed-media drawings on panel that function as visual poems, taking inspiration from Edgar Allen Poe’s poem, “The Hymn.” In Poe’s short poem, he beseeches the Virgin Mary, or Maria, to bring light after troubling times, writing,

“Now, when storms of Fate o’ercast

Darkly my Present and my Past,

Let my Future radiant shine

With sweet hopes of thee and thine!”

Tijuana Radiant Shine depicts the dichotomy between the hopes and realities of everyday people in Tijuana, making references to local history, mythology, technology, pop culture, and religion. The series title contrasts the parts of the city of Tijuana that shine with those parts that are darkened. Unlike Tijuanerias (2012), in which he interpreted and represented “La Leyenda Negra”, the black legend of Tijuana, Tijuana Radiant Shine attempts to dismantle this legend and the negative perspectives that comes with it. In 2014, Tijuana Radiant Shine No. 1 was awarded the Grand Prize at the FEMSA Monterrey Biennial. The Tijuana Radiant Shine series was exhibited at Luis de Jesus Gallery in Los Angeles alongside Shattered Mural in 2015.

=== Shattered Mural, 2015 ===
Shattered Mural was exhibited alongside Tijuana Radiant Shine at the Luis de Jesus Gallery Los Angeles in 2015. Shattered Mural is a floor installation that consists of wall fragments bearing portraits in reference to the Ayotzinapa case, the forced disappearance of 43 young victims in the Iguala mass kidnapping in the Mexican State of Guerrero. On September 26, 2014, 43 students of the Ayotzinapa Rural Teachers’ College in Guerrero, Mexico were shot at and abducted by local police and the Mexican Army. All 43 were declared missing and are presumed dead. The students became a symbol for victims of institutional corruption and oppressive regimes. Crosthwaite discussed the impunity of this human rights violation and linked it to the broader context of thousands of people who have been killed in the context of Mexico’s drug war since the early 2000s. When journalist Carolina Miranda asked Crosthwaite about the inspiration and emotions behind the work in an interview for the Los Angeles Times, he replied, “I wanted the idea of the humanity of Mexico being shattered.”

Crosthwaite created the sculptural fragments of Shattered Mural by deconstructing a mural into forty-three shards. Rendered in his signature black and white, each 3-dimensional shard features the face of a different man, women, or child. The faces in the piece are not the faces of the actual Ayotzinapa victims. In an interview, Crosthwaite noted that he felt rendering their features would be disrespectful to them and their families. Instead, the fragments render everyday faces of people from Rosarito and Tijuana, as well as historical Mexican figures, performers, and idols. The cast of characters represents the artist's effort to capture the spectrum of humanity, with all of its idiosyncrasies. In a Los Angeles Times review of the mural’s exhibition, Sharon Mizota wrote, “As you wander gingerly among them, it’s tempting to think you could put them all back together.” However, they don’t in fact come together to form a unified narrative. Crosthwaite describes it as a puzzle you can’t unite, filled with disparate narratives. This is the artist's metaphor for an improvisational city like Tijuana, in which a brothel could exist right above a family restaurant.

=== Tijuana Bibles, 2018 ===
Tijuana Bibles was exhibited at Pierogi Gallery in Brooklyn, NY from October 13, 2018-November 18, 2018. This series was featured a second time at Luis de Jesus Los Angeles Gallery from November 9, 2019-January 4, 2020 in an exhibition called titled TIJUAS! (Death March, Tijuana Bibles, and Other Legends). Tijuana Bibles is a multi-faceted series of work that consists of two books of original drawings done in black ink on paper. The series is a spin on the original concept of “Tijuana bibles,” which were cheap pornographic books of cartoon characters such as Mickey Mouse from the 1920s–1960s. Produced and sold in the U.S., these books had nothing to do with Tijuana, but the use of “Tijuana” evoked a sense of exoticism and lawlessness that U.S. Americans associated with Mexico. When talking about the work, Crosthwaite said, “For my project I wanted to play with the notion of the Tijuana bible by creating my own book of hand drawn images as a kind of Sacred/Profane book. The narratives deal with issues of the border, immigration, narco culture, and idiosyncrasies of the city of Tijuana, playing with old stereotypes of how Americans see Mexico and Mexicans, especially with the current rhetoric from political figures…” Crosthwaite’s cartoon-like drawings depict these narratives in his signature black ink, and unlike the original Tijuana Bibles, Crosthwaite’s series actually features scenes from Tijuana.

The installation featured two stop-motion animation videos of Crosthwaite creating Tijuana Bibles. In the videos, Crosthwaite’s hand is only visible when turning the page, so the images on the page seem to appear, in Crosthwaite’s own words, “as if they were drawn by God, the common notion of a sacred book.”

=== Tijuacolor, 2024-2025 ===
In 2024, Crosthwaite exhibited a new series of largescale paintings at the Bread and Salt Gallery in Los Angeles that included the use of color for the first time in his professional career. The title of the series is a play on the word ‘technicolor’, a term that was used to advertise and popularize the transition from black and white to color cinematography in the early twentieth century. Crosthwaite explained that the transition into color occurred as the result of his inability to find a new sketchbook with white pages while traveling. On a trip to purchase a new sketchbook, the art supply store near him only had books with colored page in stock, so purchasing the sketchbook, Crosthwaite decided to start experimenting with black ink on color. In an article for KPBS, Julia Dixon Evans wrote that, “Throughout his career, Crosthwaite has masterfully represented the Tijuana cityscape as a vertical, towering, beautiful cluster of houses and buildings. And in translating that style into color, he adds a new level of detail, allure and story.” Additions to the Tijuacolor series were exhibited at the Luis de Jesus Gallery in Los Angeles (March 1–April 5, 2025) and Washington and Lee University's Staniar Gallery (April 28–May 30, 2025).

== Group exhibitions ==
The artist's work has been included numerous international exhibitions. A 48 x 48 inch drawing on canvas, Lion Hunt, was selected by a juror and Whitney Museum curator for inclusion in the 22nd International Juried Show at the Visual Arts Center of New Jersey in 2008. In 2007, Crosthwaite was also featured in a traveling exhibition organized by the Museum of Contemporary Art, San Diego entitled TRANSactions: Contemporary Latin American and Latino Art. In 2006, Crosthwaite was included in Paper Traces: Latin American Prints and Drawings from the Museum's Collection at The San Diego Museum of Art. In 2005, two drawings, Chocada and Hombre Sobre Mesa, were included in the VII Bienal Monterrey FEMSA de Pintura, Escultura e Instalación in Monterrey, Mexico. A 6 foot square architectural drawing was included in the XII Bienal Rufino Tamayo organized by the Museo Tamayo Arte Contemporáneo in Mexico City and was shown at many venues throughout Mexico from 2004 to early 2006. A large figurative piece, Sueño Pequeño was also included in Mujeres de Juárez: Art Against Crime, an exhibition of works by artists protesting the violence against women in Ciudad Juárez, Mexico.

== Interviews with the artist ==
- Karly Quadros, "Borderlands: An Interview of Hugo Crosthwaite," March 14, 2025.
- The World of Artist Hugo Crosthwaite, 2023
