= Crosthwaite =

Village in Cumbria, England

Coordinates: 54.316022°N 2.865457°W

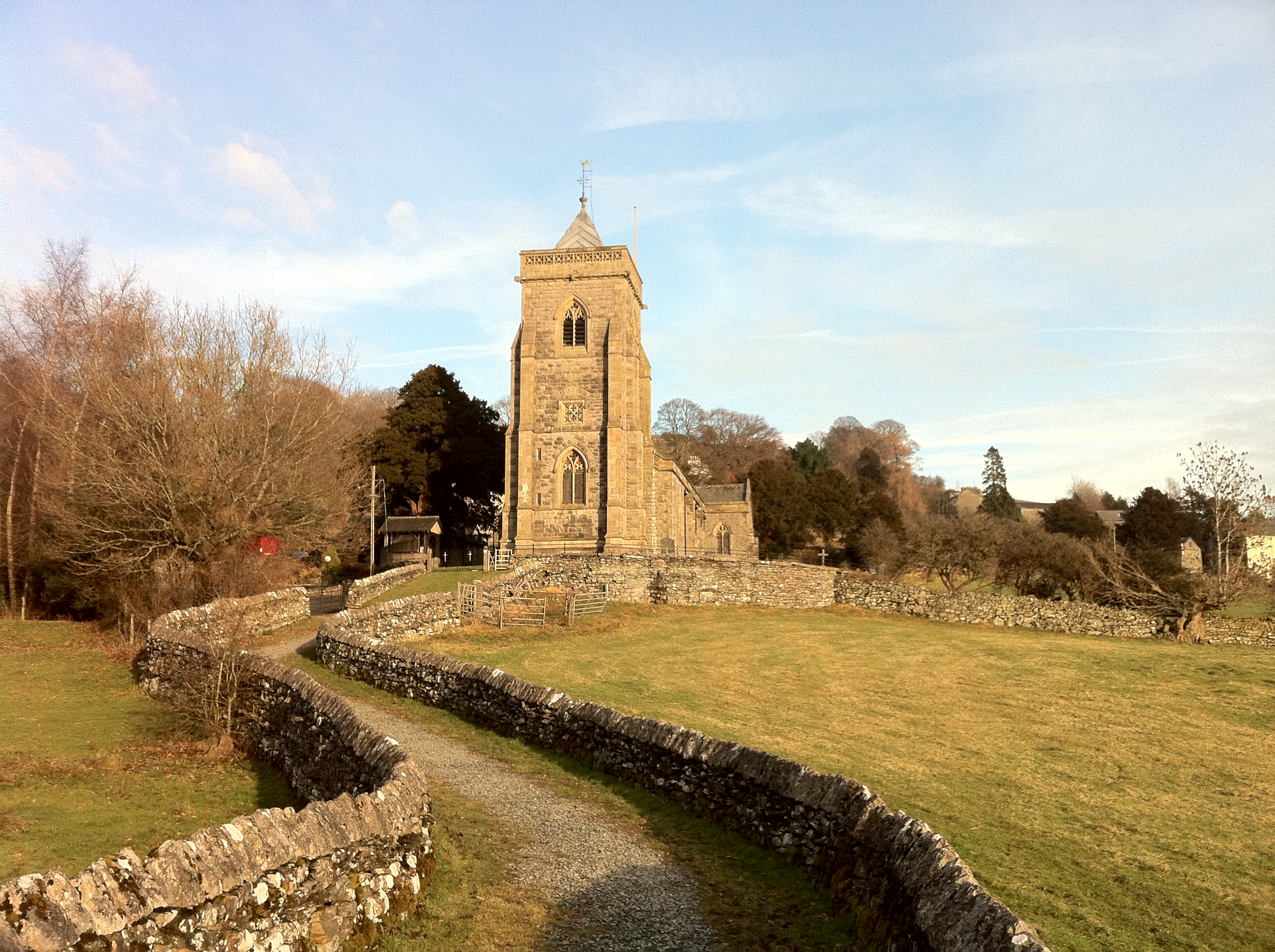
- St Mary's Church, Crosthwaite

- Location in South Lakeland Location within Cumbria
- OS grid reference: SD437914
- Civil parish: Crosthwaite and Lyth
- Unitary authority: Westmorland and Furness
- Ceremonial county: Cumbria
- Region: North West
- Country: England
- Sovereign state: United Kingdom
- Post town: Kendal
- Postcode district: LA8
- Dialling code: 015395
- Police: Cumbria
- Fire: Cumbria
- Ambulance: North West
- UK Parliament: Westmorland and Lonsdale

Crosthwaite is a small village located in the Parish of Crosthwaite and Lyth, Westmorland and Furness, Cumbria, England. It is in the Lake District National Park.

== Village hall ==
The Argles Memorial Hall was built in 1931 on land donated from the local landowners. It underwent a major refurbishment in 2003 and is currently used by The Exchange, children's playgroups and keep fit classes.

== Exchange ==
The Crosthwaite Exchange was set up in February 2007 as a place for local people to buy and sell local produce, home baked goods, books, and meet up with other villagers. Since then, the exchange has been used by the NHS as a model for exchanges in other villages.

== St Mary's Parish Church ==
Crosthwaite is home to the St Mary's Parish Church. The first reference to a place of worship was in a 12th-century grant of land.

== See also ==
- Listed buildings in Crosthwaite and Lyth
