= Grade II* listed buildings in Westmorland and Furness =

There are over 20,000 Grade II* listed buildings in England. This page is a list of these buildings in the district of Westmorland and Furness in Cumbria.

It is split by the three former districts which make up the unitary authority area, the Borough of Barrow-in-Furness, Eden and South Lakeland.

== Former Borough of Barrow-in-Furness ==
Name	Location	Type	Completed (Note: The date given is the date used by Historic England as significant for the initial building or that of an important part in the structure's description.)	Date designated	Grid ref. (Note: The grid reference is based on the British national grid reference system, sometimes known as OSGB36, used by the Ordnance Survey.) Geo-coordinates	Entry number (Note: The "List Entry Number" is a unique number assigned to each listed building and scheduled monument by Historic England.)	Image
Gate piers and wall enclosing forecourt at Marsh Grange	Ireleth, Askam and Ireleth	Gate	Late 17th to early 18th century	25 February 1950	SD2212379707; 54°12′26″N 3°11′44″W	1218964	Upload Photo
Marsh Grange Farmhouse	Ireleth, Askam and Ireleth	Farmhouse	Early 17th century	25 February 1950	SD2209079715; 54°12′26″N 3°11′46″W	1201091	Marsh Grange Farmhouse
Church of St Mary	Dalton-in-Furness	Church	1882–85	25 February 1950	SD2258073886; 54°09′18″N 3°11′13″W	1209758	Church of St Mary More images
Tytup Hall	Tytup, Dalton Town with Newton	Country house	c.1710	25 February 1950	SD2357675980; 54°10′26″N 3°10′20″W	1208891	Upload Photo
Abbey House Hotel	Barrow-in-Furness	Town house	1910–14	10 November 1949	SD2168872094; 54°08′19″N 3°12′01″W	1197910	Abbey House Hotel More images
Barn immediately to rear of Sowerby Hall Farmhouse	Barrow-in-Furness	Barn	Late 16th to early 17th century	20 December 1993	SD1986172464; 54°08′30″N 3°13′42″W	1283032	Upload Photo
Church of St James	Barrow-in-Furness	Church	1867–69	6 May 1976	SD1946069944; 54°07′09″N 3°14′01″W	1197881	Church of St James More images
Devonshire Buildings	Barrow Island, Barrow-in-Furness	Tenement block	c.1875	6 May 1976	SD1961868327; 54°06′16″N 3°13′51″W	1197845	Devonshire Buildings More images
Devonshire Buildings, Island Road Mission, the Devonshire Public House	Barrow Island	Tenement block	1872–74	6 May 1976	SD1955668196; 54°06′12″N 3°13′54″W	1218436	Devonshire Buildings, Island Road Mission, the Devonshire Public House More images
Ormsgill Farmhouse	Ormsgill	Farmhouse	1605	10 November 1949	SD1918871366; 54°07′54″N 3°14′18″W	1218612	Upload Photo
Park House Farmhouse	Barrow-in-Furness	Farmhouse	16th century	10 November 1949	SD2236671038; 54°07′46″N 3°11′22″W	1197851	Upload Photo
Sloop Street Tenements	Barrow Island	Workers cottage	1881–84	20 December 1993	SD1961468095; 54°06′09″N 3°13′51″W	1201084	Sloop Street Tenements More images
Steamer Street Tenements	Barrow Island	Workers cottage	1881–84	20 December 1993	SD1967668226; 54°06′13″N 3°13′48″W	1282852	Steamer Street Tenements More images
Town Hall	Barrow-in-Furness	Town hall	1882–87	6 May 1976	SD1983869102; 54°06′41″N 3°13′40″W	1197859	Town Hall More images
Walney Lighthouse with two attached cottages and outbuildings	Walney Island	House	1790	6 May 1976	SD2301962058; 54°02′55″N 3°10′38″W	1218858	Walney Lighthouse with two attached cottages and outbuildings More images

== Former Eden District ==
Name	Location	Type	Completed	Date designated	Grid ref. Geo-coordinates	Entry number	Image
Byre West of Townhead	Newbiggin, Ainstable	Bastle	Mid 16th century	3 August 1984	NY5628049083; 54°50′05″N 2°40′56″W	1137235	Upload Photo
The Old Pele and Rectory Farmhouse and Barn	Croglin, Ainstable	House	Early 15th century	3 August 1984	NY5754147276; 54°49′07″N 2°39′44″W	1327028	The Old Pele and Rectory Farmhouse and Barn More images
Clarghyll Hall	Alston Moor	Bastle	16th century	25 September 1951	NY7257249324; 54°50′17″N 2°25′43″W	1087069	Clarghyll Hall More images
Market Cross	Alston, Alston Moor	Market Cross	1764	25 September 1951	NY7188646498; 54°48′45″N 2°26′20″W	1325968	Market Cross More images
Church of St Michael	Appleby-in-Westmorland	Church	13th century	6 June 1951	NY6886419885; 54°34′24″N 2°28′59″W	1137750	Church of St Michael More images
High Cross	Appleby-in-Westmorland	Column	17th century	6 June 1951	NY6843420137; 54°34′32″N 2°29′23″W	1311978	High Cross More images
Lamp Post on North Side of High Cross	Appleby-in-Westmorland	Lamp Post	Late 19th century	21 March 1985	NY6843220140; 54°34′32″N 2°29′23″W	1145608	Lamp Post on North Side of High Cross
Low Cross	Appleby-in-Westmorland	Column	18th century	6 June 1951	NY6833820391; 54°34′40″N 2°29′29″W	1138035	Low Cross More images
Moot Hall	Appleby-in-Westmorland	Hall	1596	6 June 1951	NY6835320347; 54°34′38″N 2°29′28″W	1145607	Moot Hall More images
St Anne's Hospital Chapel at St Anne's Hospital	Appleby-in-Westmorland	House	1651-53	6 June 1951	NY6843420200; 54°34′34″N 2°29′23″W	1145571	St Anne's Hospital Chapel at St Anne's Hospital More images
The Cloisters	Appleby-in-Westmorland	Tower	1811	6 June 1951	NY6833220406; 54°34′40″N 2°29′29″W	1319048	The Cloisters More images
30 Boroughgate	Appleby-in-Westmorland	House	1717	6 June 1951	NY6836720280; 54°34′36″N 2°29′27″W	1146473	30 Boroughgate More images
36 Boroughgate	Appleby-in-Westmorland	House	Late 17th century	6 June 1951	NY6837420244; 54°34′35″N 2°29′27″W	1145578	36 Boroughgate
33 Chapel Street	Appleby-in-Westmorland	Offices	early 19th century	6 June 1951	NY6825620358; 54°34′39″N 2°29′33″W	1145588	33 Chapel Street More images
Asby Hall, Area Railings and Central Gate	Great Asby, Asby	House	1694	6 February 1968	NY6826713270; 54°30′49″N 2°29′30″W	1144927	Upload Photo
Gaythorne Hall	Asby	Country House	16th century	6 February 1968	NY6496113278; 54°30′49″N 2°32′34″W	1137181	Gaythorne Hall More images
Old Rectory	Great Asby, Asby	House	1984	6 February 1968	NY6804713154; 54°30′46″N 2°29′42″W	1326996	Upload Photo
Well to East of Grange Hall	Asby	Well House	Mediaeval	12 April 1984	NY6855310893; 54°29′33″N 2°29′13″W	1144934	Well to East of Grange Hall
Church of St Peter	Askham	Parish Church	Medieval	6 February 1968	NY5181823856; 54°36′27″N 2°44′51″W	1145271	Church of St Peter More images
Church of St Patrick	Bampton	Parish Church	Medieval	6 February 1968	NY5215718040; 54°33′19″N 2°44′29″W	1145258	Church of St Patrick More images
Barton Church Farmhouse	Barton	Farmhouse	Late 16th century	6 February 1968	NY4852426433; 54°37′49″N 2°47′56″W	1145234	Upload Photo
Glebe Farmhouse	Barton	House	1637	6 February 1968	NY4860726394; 54°37′48″N 2°47′51″W	1336948	Glebe Farmhouse More images
Bewley Castle	Bolton	Castle		6 February 1968	NY6478421149; 54°35′03″N 2°32′47″W	1065873	Upload Photo
Crossrigg Hall	Bolton	House	c. 1864	12 April 1984	NY6058724148; 54°36′39″N 2°36′42″W	1357502	Crossrigg Hall More images
Church of St Michael	Church Brough, Brough	Parish Church	12th century	12 September 1957	NY7931513921; 54°31′13″N 2°19′16″W	1144902	Church of St Michael More images
Alms Table Beside Countess's Pillar	Brougham	Commemorative Monument	1656	3 September 1987	NY5461828957; 54°39′13″N 2°42′18″W	1099102	Alms Table Beside Countess's Pillar
Chapel of St Wilfred of Brougham Chapel	Brougham	Chapel	Medieval	6 February 1968	NY5276528401; 54°38′55″N 2°44′01″W	1349045	Chapel of St Wilfred of Brougham Chapel More images
Countess's Pillar	Brougham	Sundial	1654?	6 February 1968	NY5461428957; 54°39′13″N 2°42′18″W	1326777	Countess's Pillar More images
Curtain Walls, Gateway Buildings, Stables, and Domestic Ranges Forming Part of Brougham Hall	Brougham	House	Late 15th century or Early 16th century	20 May 1975	NY5279828378; 54°38′54″N 2°43′59″W	1145355	Curtain Walls, Gateway Buildings, Stables, and Domestic Ranges Forming Part of Brougham Hall More images
Hornby Hall and Barns Adjoining	Brougham	Farmhouse	Early - mid 16th century	6 February 1968	NY5693129930; 54°39′45″N 2°40′09″W	1326775	Upload Photo
Ruins of Brougham Hall	Brougham	House	Early 19th century	20 May 1975	NY5279428350; 54°38′53″N 2°43′59″W	1099141	Ruins of Brougham Hall More images
Church of St Kentigern	Castle Sowerby	Parish Church	12th century	27 December 1967	NY3799936145; 54°42′59″N 2°57′50″W	1326686	Church of St Kentigern More images
The Ashes	Highbridge, Castle Sowerby	House	Mid 16th century	27 December 1967	NY3916242707; 54°46′32″N 2°56′50″W	1319031	Upload Photo
Church of St John	Newton Reigny, Catterlen	Sundial	Late 12th century	27 December 1967	NY4798431601; 54°40′36″N 2°48′29″W	1145530	Church of St John More images
Church of St Cuthbert	Clifton	Parish Church	12th century	6 February 1968	NY5319027045; 54°38′11″N 2°43′36″W	1348695	Church of St Cuthbert More images
Nether Hoff Farmhouse	Colby	Farmhouse	1683	6 February 1968	NY6674620043; 54°34′28″N 2°30′57″W	1327000	Nether Hoff Farmhouse More images
Smardalegill Viaduct over Scandal Beck	Crosby Garrett, Crosby Garrett	Railway Viaduct	1860	17 December 1984	NY7268706904; 54°27′24″N 2°25′22″W	1137239	Smardalegill Viaduct over Scandal Beck More images
The Old Rectory	Crosby Garrett	House	FROM 1637	6 February 1968	NY7298009621; 54°28′52″N 2°25′07″W	1145022	The Old Rectory More images
2 Summer Houses on Bowling Green Immediately to South of Maulds Meaburn Hall	Maulds Meaburn, Crosby Ravensworth	Summerhouse	Pre C18?	6 February 1968	NY6240017011; 54°32′49″N 2°34′58″W	1145420	Upload Photo
Flass House	Maulds Meaburn, Crosby Ravensworth	Villa	c1848-1861	6 February 1968	NY6275215682; 54°32′06″N 2°34′38″W	1145414	Flass House More images
Garden Walls and Gatepiers to Front of Maulds Meaburn Hall	Maulds Meaburn, Crosby Ravensworth	Gate Pier	c. 1676	6 February 1968	NY6243917083; 54°32′51″N 2°34′56″W	1157873	Upload Photo
Maulds Meaburn Hall	Maulds Meaburn, Crosby Ravensworth	House	Late 16th century	6 February 1968	NY6239817075; 54°32′51″N 2°34′58″W	1326730	Maulds Meaburn Hall
Holesfoot House	Crosby Ravensworth	House	c. 1845	6 February 1968	NY6413217351; 54°33′00″N 2°33′22″W	1145441	Upload Photo
Reagill Grange	Reagill, Crosby Ravensworth	House	Late 16th century	6 February 1968	NY6077616990; 54°32′48″N 2°36′28″W	1157943	Reagill Grange More images
Church of St John	Skirwith, Culgaith	Parish Church	1856	23 June 1992	NY6176532565; 54°41′12″N 2°35′41″W	1273399	Church of St John More images
Millrigg and Dwelling Adjoining to North West	Culgaith	House	1597	27 December 1967	NY6079428260; 54°38′52″N 2°36′33″W	1107926	Millrigg and Dwelling Adjoining to North West More images
Skirwith Vicarage and Attached Coach House and Stables	Skirwith, Culgaith	Vicarage	1856	9 September 1993	NY6173432456; 54°41′08″N 2°35′42″W	1115119	Upload Photo
Carved Bear North East of Church of St Andrew	Dacre	Statue	Medieval	24 October 1986	NY4603026656; 54°37′56″N 2°50′15″W	1252583	Carved Bear North East of Church of St Andrew
Carved Bear North West of Church of St Andrew	Dacre	Statue	Medieval	24 October 1986	NY4597226649; 54°37′55″N 2°50′18″W	1145532	Carved Bear North West of Church of St Andrew
Carved Bear South East of Church of St Andrew	Dacre	Statue	Medieval	24 October 1986	NY4603526631; 54°37′55″N 2°50′15″W	1252582	Carved Bear South East of Church of St Andrew
Carved Bear South West of Church of St Andrew	Dacre	Statue	Medieval	24 October 1986	NY4596526608; 54°37′54″N 2°50′19″W	1262197	Carved Bear South West of Church of St Andrew
Fort Putnam Farmhouse, Barns, Byres, Cow House, Wall and Gateway	Greystoke, Dacre	Farmhouse	Late 18th century	27 December 1967	NY4519730940; 54°40′14″N 2°51′05″W	1145543	Fort Putnam Farmhouse, Barns, Byres, Cow House, Wall and Gateway More images
Church of St Michael	Glassonby	Church	Earlier than early 16th century	27 December 1967	NY5743538308; 54°44′17″N 2°39′45″W	1144844	Church of St Michael More images
Outbuilding to East of White House Farmhouse	Glassonby	Bastle	Late 16th century	3 August 1984	NY5774638937; 54°44′37″N 2°39′28″W	1137290	Upload Photo
Church of St Cuthbert	Great Salkeld	Altar	Roman	27 December 1967	NY5516536764; 54°43′26″N 2°41′51″W	1100260	Church of St Cuthbert More images
The Rectory	Great Salkeld	Fortified House	Early 15th century	27 December 1967	NY5515636600; 54°43′21″N 2°41′52″W	1100254	Upload Photo
Church of St Andrew	Greystoke	Parish Church	13th century	27 December 1967	NY4433530785; 54°40′09″N 2°51′53″W	1210233	Church of St Andrew More images
Greenthwaite Hall Cottage, Greenthwaite Hall Farmhouse	Greystoke	Farmhouse	Mid 16th century	27 December 1967	NY4315430207; 54°39′49″N 2°52′58″W	1145515	Upload Photo
Greystoke Castle	Greystoke Park, Greystoke	Castle	Medieval	27 December 1967	NY4354330893; 54°40′12″N 2°52′37″W	1290545	Greystoke Castle More images
Johnby Hall	Johnby, Greystoke	Fortified House	Late 14th century	27 December 1967	NY4341832758; 54°41′12″N 2°52′45″W	1326690	Johnby Hall More images
Watson Farmhouse	Greystoke Gill, Greystoke	Farmhouse	Late 18th century	24 October 1986	NY4447429535; 54°39′28″N 2°51′44″W	1210286	Upload Photo
Helbeck Hall with Retaining Wall to Rear	Helbeck	House	1776	21 June 1984	NY7921215772; 54°32′12″N 2°19′22″W	1327012	Helbeck Hall with Retaining Wall to Rear More images
Armathwaite Castle	Armathwaite, Hesket	Apartment	1939-45	27 December 1967	NY5057245873; 54°48′19″N 2°46′14″W	1145496	Armathwaite Castle More images
Church of St Mary	High Hesket, Hesket	Church	Medieval	27 December 1967	NY4760644452; 54°47′32″N 2°48′59″W	1326696	Church of St Mary More images
Southwaite Hall, Copper House and Barns Adjoining	Southwaite, Hesket	House	Mid 16th century	24 October 1986	NY4503845308; 54°47′59″N 2°51′23″W	1210645	Upload Photo
Bank Barn to North West of Barwise Hall	Hoff	Bank Barn	1681	6 February 1968	NY6591817682; 54°33′12″N 2°31′42″W	1144898	Upload Photo
Barwise Hall and Adjoining Barn and Byre	Hoff	House	1676	6 February 1968	NY6592117663; 54°33′11″N 2°31′42″W	1288861	Upload Photo
Drybeck Hall and Attached Buildings	Drybeck, Hoff	Kitchen	later than 1679	12 April 1984	NY6694315384; 54°31′58″N 2°30′44″W	1144937	Drybeck Hall and Attached Buildings More images
Salkeld Hall	Little Salkeld, Hunsonby	Flats	Earlier	27 December 1967	NY5651436124; 54°43′06″N 2°40′36″W	1083594	Salkeld Hall More images
The Watermill, Attached House, Barn and Stables	Little Salkeld, Hunsonby	Mill House	Mid - Late 18th century	11 September 1974	NY5667535980; 54°43′01″N 2°40′27″W	1145340	The Watermill, Attached House, Barn and Stables More images
Church of St Stephen	Kirkby Stephen	Church	18th century	6 February 1968	NY7751708821; 54°28′27″N 2°20′54″W	1136925	Church of St Stephen More images
Church of St Michael	Kirkby Thore	Parish Church	12th century	6 February 1968	NY6380425945; 54°37′38″N 2°33′44″W	1226012	Church of St Michael More images
Kirkby Thore Hall	Kirkby Thore	Farmhouse	1968	6 February 1968	NY6415425624; 54°37′28″N 2°33′24″W	1226011	Kirkby Thore Hall More images
Bell Tower North-east of Church of St Oswald	Kirkoswald	Bell Tower	1743	27 December 1967	NY5554240974; 54°45′42″N 2°41′33″W	1144818	Bell Tower North-east of Church of St Oswald More images
Byre to North of Croglin Low Hall	Kirkoswald	Barn	Early 16th century	22 December 1967	NY5544045033; 54°47′53″N 2°41′41″W	1137444	Upload Photo
Church of St Oswald	Kirkoswald	Church	Early 12th century	27 December 1967	NY5551440902; 54°45′40″N 2°41′34″W	1327058	Church of St Oswald More images
Croglin Low Hall	Kirkoswald	Farmhouse	1984	27 December 1967	NY5543745022; 54°47′53″N 2°41′41″W	1327062	Croglin Low Hall More images
Demesne Farmhouse	Kirkoswald	Farmhouse	1622	27 December 1967	NY5561241047; 54°45′45″N 2°41′29″W	1144810	Demesne Farmhouse More images
Nether Haresceugh	Kirkoswald	Farmhouse	1612	27 December 1967	NY5770642141; 54°46′21″N 2°39′32″W	1312296	Nether Haresceugh More images
Ona Ash	High Bankhill, Kirkoswald	House	1693	28 June 1983	NY5602742131; 54°46′20″N 2°41′06″W	1137312	Ona Ash More images
Church of St Peter	Langwathby	Parish Church	13th century	3 September 1987	NY5690433730; 54°41′48″N 2°40′13″W	1145310	Church of St Peter More images
Strickland Hall and Stables Adjoining	Little Strickland	Farmhouse	Mid 16th century	6 February 1968	NY5636019708; 54°34′15″N 2°40′35″W	1145319	Upload Photo
Church of St Michael	Lowther	Parish Church	12th century	6 February 1968	NY5190424454; 54°36′47″N 2°44′46″W	1145328	Church of St Michael More images
Hackthorpe Hall	Hackthorpe, Lowther	Farmhouse	Early 17th century	6 February 1968	NY5445222838; 54°35′55″N 2°42′23″W	1145324	Hackthorpe Hall More images
Inner Terrace Wall, Ramps and Steps North of Lowther Castle	Lowther	Steps	1806-10	3 September 1987	NY5215323868; 54°36′28″N 2°44′32″W	1343690	Inner Terrace Wall, Ramps and Steps North of Lowther Castle More images
Lodge North of Lowther Castle	Lowther	Lodge	1806-10	6 February 1968	NY5216123937; 54°36′30″N 2°44′32″W	1356111	Lodge North of Lowther Castle More images
Lowther Castle	Lowther	Country House	1806-14	6 February 1968	NY5214823802; 54°36′26″N 2°44′32″W	1068767	Lowther Castle More images
Lowther Cottage	Lowther	House	1766-73	6 February 1968	NY5365723586; 54°36′19″N 2°43′08″W	1356573	Upload Photo
Outer Terrace Wall North of Lowther Castle	Lowther	Garden Terrace	1806-10	6 February 1968	NY5221923948; 54°36′30″N 2°44′29″W	1145327	Upload Photo
Pump and Trough South of Numbers 13-20	Lowther	Trough	Late 18th century	6 February 1968	NY5362723651; 54°36′21″N 2°43′10″W	1145294	Upload Photo
Stable Block East of Lowther Castle	Lowther	Stable	1806-9	6 February 1968	NY5229823825; 54°36′26″N 2°44′24″W	1145326	Upload Photo
1–12 Lowther Village	Lowther	House	1776-73	6 February 1968	NY5355723650; 54°36′21″N 2°43′14″W	1145293	1–12 Lowther Village
23–26 Lowther Village	Lowther Village, Lowther	Estate Cottage	1766-73	6 February 1968	NY5362023682; 54°36′22″N 2°43′10″W	1145295	23–26 Lowther Village
21 and 22 Lowther Village	Lowther Village, Lowther	Estate Cottage	1765-73	6 February 1968	NY5360823677; 54°36′22″N 2°43′11″W	1326824	Upload Photo
13–20 Lowther Village	Lowther	House	1766-1773	6 February 1968	NY5360323646; 54°36′21″N 2°43′11″W	1326823	13–20 Lowther Village
Church of St Martin	Martindale	Church	Medieval foundations	6 February 1968	NY4343818401; 54°33′28″N 2°52′34″W	1326837	Church of St Martin More images
Lyulph's Tower	Matterdale	House	c. 1795	27 December 1967	NY4041220196; 54°34′24″N 2°55′24″W	1337015	Lyulph's Tower More images
Matterdale Church	Matterdale	Church	1573	27 December 1967	NY3944122440; 54°35′37″N 2°56′19″W	1145247	Matterdale Church More images
Watermillock House and Adjoining Part of Magnolia Cottage	Watermillock, Matterdale	House	Late 17th century	27 December 1967	NY4459422459; 54°35′39″N 2°51′32″W	1326838	Upload Photo
Altar Tomb to South East of Chancel of Church of St Laurence	Morland	Altar Tomb	15th century	12 April 1984	NY5984622553; 54°35′48″N 2°37′23″W	1265986	Upload Photo
Church of St Kentigern	Mungrisdale	Parish Church	1756	27 December 1967	NY3636330440; 54°39′54″N 2°59′17″W	1137800	Church of St Kentigern More images
Low Mill Farmhouse and Adjoining Barn/byres	Low Mill, Mungrisdale	Farmhouse	1611	11 January 1985	NY3683732442; 54°40′59″N 2°58′52″W	1319016	Upload Photo
Thwaite Hall	Hutton Roof, Mungrisdale	House	1967	27 December 1967	NY3748834998; 54°42′22″N 2°58′18″W	1145616	Upload Photo
Murton Hall, Adjoining Store and Area Wall to Rear	Murton	House	14th century	12 September 1957	NY7293421766; 54°35′25″N 2°25′13″W	1312339	Murton Hall, Adjoining Store and Area Wall to Rear More images
Newbiggin Hall	Newbiggin	Tower	1460s	6 February 1968	NY6280228683; 54°39′07″N 2°34′41″W	1265903	Newbiggin Hall More images
Memorial to Thomas Lawson and Shelter Against East Wall of Friends Burial Ground (at Ngr Ny 585 215)	Newby	Shelter	1691	24 June 1987	NY5852021491; 54°35′13″N 2°38′36″W	1158034	Upload Photo
Newby Hall and Area Wall to North	Newby	Apartment	1968	6 February 1968	NY5902521247; 54°35′05″N 2°38′08″W	1326734	Newby Hall and Area Wall to North More images
Ormside Hall and Adjoining Barns	Great Ormside, Ormside	House	Late 17th century	12 April 1984	NY7019217594; 54°33′10″N 2°27′45″W	1213776	Ormside Hall and Adjoining Barns More images
Church of All Saints	Orton	Parish Church	Late 12th century	6 February 1968	NY6221408395; 54°28′10″N 2°35′04″W	1145428	Church of All Saints More images
Petty Hall	Orton	House	1604	6 February 1968	NY6221208130; 54°28′02″N 2°35′04″W	1326736	Petty Hall More images
Farm Buildings Attached to Glencoyne	Glenridding, Patterdale	House	Early 17th century	12 January 1967	NY3846618685; 54°33′35″N 2°57′11″W	1245329	Upload Photo
Tarn House and Stable Adjoining West Return	Ravenstonedale	House	1664	6 February 1968	NY7497403396; 54°25′31″N 2°23′14″W	1158397	Upload Photo
The Lane Cottage with Attached Barn and Stable	Ravenstonedale	Farmhouse	1767	6 February 1968	NY6943004178; 54°25′56″N 2°28′22″W	1326761	Upload Photo
Market Hall	Shap	Market Hall	c. 1687	6 February 1968	NY5628915150; 54°31′47″N 2°40′37″W	1145382	Market Hall More images
Garden Gate, Piers and Wall Immediately North of Eighteenth Century Wing of High Head Castle	High Head, Skelton	Gate	1744-7	27 December 1967	NY4028043369; 54°46′54″N 2°55′48″W	1145452	Upload Photo
High Head Castle, Eighteenth Century Wing	High Head, Skelton	Castle	Medieval	24 October 1986	NY4027943334; 54°46′53″N 2°55′48″W	1145451	High Head Castle, Eighteenth Century Wing More images
Tudor Wing West of High Head Castle	High Head, Skelton	Castle	Mid 16th century	24 October 1986	NY4026543332; 54°46′53″N 2°55′49″W	1145453	Upload Photo
Thrimby Hall	Thrimby	Farmhouse	1673	6 February 1968	NY5556420464; 54°34′39″N 2°41′20″W	1076978	Upload Photo
Smardale Hall and Adjoining Buildings	Waitby	House	C19/C20	6 February 1968	NY7392008096; 54°28′03″N 2°24′14″W	1326959	Smardale Hall and Adjoining Buildings More images
Warcop Hall	Warcop	House	Late 16th century	12 September 1957	NY7471915728; 54°32′10″N 2°23′32″W	1137455	Upload Photo
Warcop Old Bridge over River Eden to South-west of Eden Gate	Warcop	Road Bridge	16th century	12 September 1957	NY7432215095; 54°31′50″N 2°23′54″W	1144870	Warcop Old Bridge over River Eden to South-west of Eden Gate More images
Manor House	Winton	House	1726	12 September 1957	NY7841110607; 54°29′25″N 2°20′05″W	1144873	Manor House More images
Mansion House	Eamont Bridge, Yanwath and Eamont Bridge	House	1686	6 February 1968	NY5231228584; 54°39′00″N 2°44′26″W	1326789	Mansion House More images
Abbots Bank	Penrith	House	1820	24 April 1951	NY5181230165; 54°39′51″N 2°44′55″W	1145097	Upload Photo
Carleton Hall (Cumbria Police Headquarters)	Carleton	House	Early 18th century	24 April 1951	NY5254829208; 54°39′21″N 2°44′13″W	1312133	Carleton Hall (Cumbria Police Headquarters) More images
Carleton Hall Farmhouse	Carleton	Farmhouse	Early 18th century	24 April 1951	NY5286429525; 54°39′31″N 2°43′56″W	1326892	Upload Photo
Cockell House	Penrith	House	1660	24 April 1951	NY5116630774; 54°40′11″N 2°45′31″W	1326920	Cockell House
Corney House	Penrith	House	1777	24 April 1951	NY5148430391; 54°39′58″N 2°45′13″W	1312134	Corney House
Hutton Hall	Penrith	House	17th century	9 February 1983	NY5180630250; 54°39′54″N 2°44′55″W	1326922	Hutton Hall More images
Lowther Gardens	Penrith	House	18th century	24 April 1951	NY5154630146; 54°39′51″N 2°45′10″W	1137877	Lowther Gardens
Malthouse in Grounds of Shepherd's Hill	Penrith	Malt House	18th century	9 February 1983	NY5122430492; 54°40′02″N 2°45′28″W	1145062	Upload Photo
Mansion House	Penrith	Mansion House	1750	24 April 1951	NY5173330219; 54°39′53″N 2°44′59″W	1145109	Upload Photo
2 Gate Piers to the Forecourt of the Mansion House	Penrith	Gate Pier	18th century	24 April 1951	NY5176830169; 54°39′51″N 2°44′57″W	1145110	Upload Photo
Masonic Hall	Penrith	Freemasons Hall	Early 18th century	24 April 1951	NY5179430236; 54°39′54″N 2°44′56″W	1312059	Masonic Hall More images
North Friarage	Penrith	House	1717	24 April 1951	NY5180030127; 54°39′50″N 2°44′56″W	1145096	Upload Photo
Plague Stone in Grounds of Greengarth Old People's Home	Penrith	Cross	Earlier	24 April 1951	NY5196329563; 54°39′32″N 2°44′46″W	1137825	Plague Stone in Grounds of Greengarth Old People's Home More images
Shepherd's Hill	Penrith	House	Late 18th century	24 April 1951	NY5124130506; 54°40′02″N 2°45′27″W	1311922	Upload Photo
The George Hotel	Penrith	House	Early 18th century	24 April 1951	NY5157230174; 54°39′52″N 2°45′08″W	1145087	The George Hotel More images
Tourist Information Centre	Penrith	School	Elizabethan	24 April 1951	NY5145530334; 54°39′57″N 2°45′15″W	1311984	Tourist Information Centre More images
Tudor Restaurant	Penrith	House	16th century	24 April 1951	NY5161730119; 54°39′50″N 2°45′06″W	1145054	Upload Photo
Two Lions Public House and Integral Stables	Penrith	Public House	17th century	24 April 1951	NY5157029970; 54°39′45″N 2°45′08″W	1312062	Two Lions Public House and Integral Stables More images
1 St Andrew's Place	Penrith	House	c. 1750	24 April 1951	NY5166030115; 54°39′50″N 2°45′03″W	1138160	Upload Photo
17 and 18 Devonshire Street	Penrith	House	18th century	9 February 1983	NY5154130203; 54°39′52″N 2°45′10″W	1145086	17 and 18 Devonshire Street More images
13, 14 and 15 Sandgate	Penrith	House	Earlier	24 April 1951	NY5170430348; 54°39′57″N 2°45′01″W	1145056	Upload Photo
4 Angel Lane	Penrith	House	Earlier	24 April 1951	NY5156230074; 54°39′48″N 2°45′09″W	1326903	Upload Photo
1, 2 and 3 Bishop Yards	Penrith	House	18th century	24 April 1951	NY5173330143; 54°39′51″N 2°44′59″W	1326890	Upload Photo
Crackenthorpe Hall	Crackenthorpe	House	17th century	6 February 1968	NY6621521803; 54°35′25″N 2°31′28″W	1225826	Upload Photo

== Former South Lakeland District ==
Name	Location	Type	Completed	Date designated	Grid ref. Geo-coordinates	Entry number	Image
Church of Cuthbert	Aldingham	Church	c. 1190	25 March 1970	SD2834571034; 54°07′49″N 3°05′53″W	1335944	Church of Cuthbert More images
Arnside Tower	Arnside	Tower House	Ruin	12 February 1962	SD4587876837; 54°11′04″N 2°49′51″W	1312275	Arnside Tower More images
Beckside House	Barbon	House	1767	12 February 1962	SD6270082715; 54°14′20″N 2°34′26″W	1312337	Upload Photo
Church of St Bartholomew	Barbon	Church	1893	21 February 1989	SD6305082462; 54°14′11″N 2°34′06″W	1086928	Church of St Bartholomew More images
Ashton House	Beetham	House	Mid 18th century	21 November 1952	SD4959579467; 54°12′30″N 2°46′28″W	1087330	Ashton House More images
Beetham Hall and attached Outbuildings	Beetham	House	later alterations	21 November 1952	SD4992079055; 54°12′17″N 2°46′09″W	1312254	Beetham Hall and attached Outbuildings More images
Curtain wall about 30m north of Beetham Hall	Beetham	Curtain Wall	Medieval	21 November 1952	SD4993479114; 54°12′19″N 2°46′09″W	1137542	Curtain wall about 30m north of Beetham Hall
Heron Corn Mill and attached Mill Race	Beetham	Corn Mill	Late 18th century or earlier	1 July 1974	SD4962179969; 54°12′47″N 2°46′26″W	1087334	Heron Corn Mill and attached Mill Race More images
Church of St Peter	Field Broughton, Broughton East	Church	1892-4	25 March 1970	SD3870581776; 54°13′41″N 2°56′30″W	1349025	Church of St Peter More images
Broughton Tower special school	Broughton in Furness, Broughton West	House	14th century	18 May 1953	SD2139787917; 54°16′51″N 3°12′32″W	1335949	Broughton Tower special school More images
Obelisk and Stocks	Broughton-in-Furness, Broughton West	Obelisk	1810	25 March 1970	SD2122387580; 54°16′40″N 3°12′41″W	1086822	Obelisk and Stocks More images
Burton House, North Wing; Burton House, South Wing; Burton House and Rear Garden Wall attached to South Wing and Forming Rear Wa	Burton-in-Kendal	House	Late 18th century	12 February 1962	SD5303276215; 54°10′46″N 2°43′16″W	1087316	Burton House, North Wing; Burton House, South Wing; Burton House and Rear Garden Wall attached to South Wing and Forming Rear Wa More images
Entrance Lodge to south of Broadleys	Cartmel Fell	Lodge	1898-1900	13 May 1972	SD3931393262; 54°19′53″N 2°56′05″W	1266564	Entrance Lodge to south of Broadleys
Hodge Hill	Cartmel Fell	House	1560	18 May 1953	SD4184888162; 54°17′09″N 2°53′41″W	1289621	Hodge Hill More images
Casterton Hall, East Wing, the Mews (includes the Orangery)	Casterton	House	Early 19th century	21 November 1952	SD6195379398; 54°12′32″N 2°35′05″W	1335933	Casterton Hall, East Wing, the Mews (includes the Orangery) More images
Friends' Meeting House	Colthouse, Claife	Schoolroom	1688	25 March 1970	SD3588798174; 54°22′30″N 2°59′18″W	1087266	Friends' Meeting House More images
Hill Top	Near Sawrey, Claife	Farmhouse	17th century or early 18th century	25 March 1970	SD3700995563; 54°21′06″N 2°58′14″W	1087304	Hill Top More images
Wray Castle	Wray, Claife	House	1840-47	25 March 1970	NY3749701014; 54°24′03″N 2°57′51″W	1106324	Wray Castle More images
The Cragg, Cragg Cottage and Barn	Colthouse, Claife	House	1695	25 March 1970	SD3594198535; 54°22′42″N 2°59′16″W	1087263	The Cragg, Cragg Cottage and Barn More images
Church of St Peter	Finsthwaite, Colton	Church	1973-9	23 July 1987	SD3688387826; 54°16′56″N 2°58′15″W	1225177	Church of St Peter More images
Nibthwaite Mill	Nibthwaite, Colton	House	1987	23 July 1987	SD2946488292; 54°17′07″N 3°05′06″W	1225382	Upload Photo
Rook How Friends' Meeting House and Cottage	Rusland, Colton	House	1725	25 March 1970	SD3322389542; 54°17′50″N 3°01′39″W	1225464	Rook How Friends' Meeting House and Cottage More images
Brantwood	Coniston	House	c. 1797	25 March 1970	SD3125895854; 54°21′13″N 3°03′33″W	1335727	Brantwood More images
Coniston Hall	Haws Bank, Coniston	Farmhouse	1953	18 May 1953	SD3048396364; 54°21′29″N 3°04′16″W	1119652	Coniston Hall More images
Lodge and former Stable approx 70m to south of Brantwood	Coniston	Stable	18th century	22 September 1987	SD3123495798; 54°21′11″N 3°03′34″W	1087283	Lodge and former Stable approx 70m to south of Brantwood
Cowmire Hall and Wall running Approx 20m to East, with Gate Piers	Crosthwaite and Lyth	House	17th century	21 November 1952	SD4275188713; 54°17′27″N 2°52′52″W	1087118	Cowmire Hall and Wall running Approx 20m to East, with Gate Piers More images
Biggerside Farmhouse	Dentdale, Dent	Farmhouse	1690	14 June 1984	SD7001487733; 54°17′04″N 2°27′44″W	1383820	Upload Photo
Burton Hill Farmhouse including adjoining Outbuilding	Dentdale, Dent	Farmhouse	Probably mid to later 17th century	14 June 1984	SD6724989851; 54°18′12″N 2°30′17″W	1383829	Upload Photo
High Hall Farmhouse including Cartshed	Dentdale, Dent	Farmhouse	1625	16 March 1954	SD7037587610; 54°17′00″N 2°27′24″W	1383893	High Hall Farmhouse including Cartshed More images
High House	Gawthrop, Dent	Farmhouse	1687	16 March 1954	SD6926186858; 54°16′35″N 2°28′25″W	1383968	Upload Photo
Newland Blast Furnace and attached ancillary Buildings	Newland, Egton with Newland	Blast furnace	Late 18th century or earlier	14 April 1993	SD2999879709; 54°12′30″N 3°04′29″W	1096782	Newland Blast Furnace and attached ancillary Buildings More images
Plumpton Hall	Egton with Newland	House	Mid to late 16th century	18 May 1953	SD3128778718; 54°11′59″N 3°03′17″W	1158458	Plumpton Hall More images
Lune Viaduct (that Part in Firbank CP)	Marthwaite, Firbank	Railway Viaduct	1857-61	14 June 1984	SD6306493054; 54°19′54″N 2°34′10″W	1086911	Lune Viaduct (that Part in Firbank CP) More images
Badger Dub and Stable or Shippon attached to South West	Garsdale	Farmhouse	Probably early 18th century	14 June 1984	SD7231290629; 54°18′38″N 2°25′37″W	1384006	Upload Photo
Dandra Garth	Garsdale	Farmhouse	Probably late 17th century	16 March 1954	SD7532989705; 54°18′08″N 2°22′50″W	1384014	Dandra Garth More images
East Rackenthwaite and adjoining Barn	Garsdale	Farmhouse	Probably 16th century or early 17th century	11 August 1978	SD7323190326; 54°18′28″N 2°24′46″W	1384019	East Rackenthwaite and adjoining Barn More images
Netherwood Hotel	Grange-over-Sands	Hotel	1893	2 May 1975	SD4142678401; 54°11′53″N 2°53′58″W	1269682	Netherwood Hotel More images
Clock Tower Works	Low Wood, Haverthwaite	Gunpowder Works	1849	2 September 1985	SD3466583679; 54°14′41″N 3°00′15″W	1266371	Clock Tower Works More images
Anne Tyson's Cottage	Hawkshead	House	17th century	18 May 1953	SD3516998175; 54°22′30″N 2°59′58″W	1338191	Anne Tyson's Cottage More images
Hawkshead Courthouse	Hawkshead	Court House	13th century	25 March 1970	SD3504298813; 54°22′50″N 3°00′06″W	1335777	Hawkshead Courthouse More images
Hawkshead Grammar School	Hawkshead	School	1675	18 May 1953	SD3523698038; 54°22′25″N 2°59′54″W	1087232	Hawkshead Grammar School More images
Hawkshead Old Hall	Hawkshead	House	17th century	18 May 1953	SD3492798781; 54°22′49″N 3°00′12″W	1087223	Upload Photo
Stables and attached Barn to South West of Sizergh Castle	Helsington	House	1983	22 November 1983	SD4979387838; 54°17′01″N 2°46′22″W	1136853	Stables and attached Barn to South West of Sizergh Castle More images
Barn to East of Park House Farmhouse with Attached Shippons to North and East	Heversham	Horse Engine House	19th century	21 November 1952	SD4951982640; 54°14′13″N 2°46′34″W	1086563	Upload Photo
Church of St Peter	Heversham	Cross	Celtic	12 February 1962	SD4960083390; 54°14′37″N 2°46′30″W	1086557	Church of St Peter More images
Heversham Hall	Heversham	House	14th century	21 November 1952	SD4938283241; 54°14′32″N 2°46′42″W	1137245	Upload Photo
Hincaster Hall	Hincaster	Farmhouse	Late 16th century	21 November 1952	SD5063684838; 54°15′25″N 2°45′33″W	1086572	Hincaster Hall More images
Church of St Anne	Hugill	Parish Church	1743	12 February 1962	SD4460898633; 54°22′49″N 2°51′16″W	1281325	Church of St Anne More images
Reston Hall	Reston, Hugill	House	1743	12 February 1962	SD4575898573; 54°22′47″N 2°50′12″W	1204237	Upload Photo
Bridge carrying Drive to North East of Helsington Laithes Farmhouse	Kendal	Road Bridge	18th century	30 January 1985	SD5067190736; 54°18′35″N 2°45′35″W	1137459	Upload Photo
Church of Holy Trinity and St George	Kendal	Roman Catholic Church	1835	30 January 1985	SD5173592761; 54°19′41″N 2°44′37″W	1318999	Church of Holy Trinity and St George More images
Collinfield Farmhouse	Kendal	Farmhouse	Mid/Late 16th century	24 April 1951	SD5108591401; 54°18′57″N 2°45′12″W	1312242	Upload Photo
Entrance to Yard 41	Kendal	Gate	C20	14 April 1969	SD5160392780; 54°19′42″N 2°44′44″W	1318997	Entrance to Yard 41 More images
Friends Meeting House	Kendal	Classroom	1934	24 April 1951	SD5177892808; 54°19′43″N 2°44′35″W	1319001	Friends Meeting House More images
Gilthwaiterigg	Kendal	House	Later	30 January 1985	SD5208395323; 54°21′04″N 2°44′19″W	1145706	Upload Photo
Helsington Laithes Farmhouse	Kendal	Manor House	Late C15/Early 16th century	24 April 1951	SD5062290700; 54°18′34″N 2°45′38″W	1145728	Upload Photo
Highgate Hotel	Kendal	House	1769	24 April 1951	SD5147492327; 54°19′27″N 2°44′51″W	1319004	Highgate Hotel More images
No.7 (includes 9 and 11)	Kendal	Town House	16th century	14 April 1969	SD5166592756; 54°19′41″N 2°44′41″W	1145672	No.7 (includes 9 and 11)
Nos 13, 15, 17 17a and 19	Kendal	House	1688	24 April 1951	SD5151292754; 54°19′41″N 2°44′49″W	1145674	Nos 13, 15, 17 17a and 19
Numbers 26 and 28 with Entrance to Yard 24	Kendal	Shop	c. 1828	14 April 1969	SD5147092671; 54°19′38″N 2°44′52″W	1145715	Numbers 26 and 28 with Entrance to Yard 24
Shop and adjoining Public Convenience	Kendal	Town House	Late 17th century	18 February 1992	SD5158792765; 54°19′41″N 2°44′45″W	1254250	Shop and adjoining Public Convenience
Wattsfield Farmhouse and Cottage	Kendal	House	17th century	24 April 1951	SD5168691291; 54°18′54″N 2°44′39″W	1145641	Upload Photo
Kentmere Hall and attached Barn	Hodgson Brow, Kentmere	Farmhouse	Late 14th century or early 15th century	21 November 1952	NY4510004236; 54°25′50″N 2°50′52″W	1086547	Kentmere Hall and attached Barn More images
Church of All Saints	Killington	Church	14th century	12 February 1962	SD6132288992; 54°17′42″N 2°35′45″W	1335928	Church of All Saints More images
Hallbeck	Hallbeck, Killington	House	1684	12 February 1962	SD6210288411; 54°17′24″N 2°35′01″W	1086885	Upload Photo
Ashlack Hall and Outbuildings	Kirkby Ireleth	House	16th century	18 May 1953	SD2467785516; 54°15′35″N 3°09′28″W	1086791	Ashlack Hall and Outbuildings More images
Church of St Cuthbert	Beck Side, Kirkby Ireleth	Church	12th century	25 March 1970	SD2336982234; 54°13′48″N 3°10′37″W	1086792	Church of St Cuthbert More images
Church Brow Cottage	Kirkby Lonsdale	House	Early 19th century	22 March 1983	SD6115978892; 54°12′15″N 2°35′49″W	1311544	Upload Photo
High Biggins Old Hall	Kirkby Lonsdale	Manor House	15th century	12 February 1962	SD6012078244; 54°11′54″N 2°36′46″W	1145801	Upload Photo
Tearnside Hall and attached Stable and Barn	Kirkby Lonsdale	Farmhouse	1686	21 November 1952	SD5882779397; 54°12′31″N 2°37′58″W	1145782	Upload Photo
Underley Hall School	Kirkby Lonsdale	House	1825-8	5 March 1982	SD6150480135; 54°12′56″N 2°35′31″W	1311597	Underley Hall School More images
Barn adjacent to the Bield	Langdales, Lakes	House	17th century	12 January 1967	NY3115803655; 54°25′25″N 3°03′45″W	1271944	Upload Photo
Barn at Town End	Troutbeck Village, Lakes	Barn	1666	12 January 1967	NY4072802234; 54°24′44″N 2°54′53″W	1245541	Barn at Town End More images
Barns, Stables etc to North and East of Rydal Hall	Rydal, Lakes	Barn		15 March 1974	NY3662606377; 54°26′56″N 2°58′44″W	1245500	Barns, Stables etc to North and East of Rydal Hall More images
Bridge over Rydal Beck in Grounds of Rydal Hall	Rydal, Lakes	Arch Bridge	Late 17th century	15 March 1974	NY3665706319; 54°26′54″N 2°58′42″W	1245408	Bridge over Rydal Beck in Grounds of Rydal Hall More images
Buildings attached to Walthwaite	Langdales, Lakes	House	17th century	12 January 1967	NY3238205568; 54°26′28″N 3°02′39″W	1245269	Upload Photo
Church of St Mary	Ambleside, Lakes	Church	1850-1854	12 January 1967	NY3739604360; 54°25′51″N 2°58′00″W	1244784	Church of St Mary More images
Church of St Mary	Rydal, Lakes	Church	1842	12 January 1967	NY3643606214; 54°26′50″N 2°58′54″W	1245403	Church of St Mary More images
Fox How	Lakes	House	1834	15 March 1974	NY3652104950; 54°26′10″N 2°58′49″W	1271870	Upload Photo
Game Larder in Grounds of Rydal Hall	Rydal, Lakes	Game Larder		15 March 1974	NY3658506422; 54°26′57″N 2°58′46″W	1245409	Game Larder in Grounds of Rydal Hall
Gatehouse at Croft Hotel	Clappersgate, Lakes	Garage	16th century	12 January 1967	NY3671603581; 54°25′25″N 2°58′37″W	1245480	Gatehouse at Croft Hotel More images
Goodybridge House and attached Barn to North East	Lakes	House	17th century	15 March 1974	NY3329608167; 54°27′52″N 3°01′50″W	1272006	Goodybridge House and attached Barn to North East More images
Ice House in Grounds of Rydal Hall	Rydal, Lakes	Icehouse		15 March 1974	NY3662806573; 54°27′02″N 2°58′44″W	1245501	Upload Photo
Jesus Church	Troutbeck, Lakes	Bell Tower	1736	12 January 1967	NY4130802796; 54°25′02″N 2°54′21″W	1271827	Jesus Church More images
Rydal Hall	Lakes	House	16th century	12 January 1967	NY3655306354; 54°26′55″N 2°58′48″W	1245499	Rydal Hall More images
Slater's Bridge (that Part in the Lakes Urban District)	Langdales, Lakes	Packhorse Bridge	17th century	12 January 1967	NY3120903010; 54°25′04″N 3°03′42″W	1245295	Slater's Bridge (that Part in the Lakes Urban District) More images
Slater's Bridge (that Part in the Parish of Coniston)	Little Langdale, Lakes	Packhorse Bridge	17th century	22 September 1987	NY3120903007; 54°25′04″N 3°03′42″W	1119623	Slater's Bridge (that Part in the Parish of Coniston) More images
Summer House in Grounds of Rydal Hall	Rydal, Lakes	Summerhouse	Late 17th century	15 March 1974	NY3664206334; 54°26′54″N 2°58′43″W	1271834	Summer House in Grounds of Rydal Hall More images
Terraces to South of Rydal Hall	Rydal, Lakes	Stepped Terrace		15 March 1974	NY3656106317; 54°26′54″N 2°58′47″W	1245407	Terraces to South of Rydal Hall More images
The Nab	Rydal, Lakes	House	1702	12 January 1967	NY3549206399; 54°26′56″N 2°59′47″W	1271876	The Nab More images
Wood Farmhouse	Troutbeck, Lakes	Farmhouse	17th century	15 March 1974	NY3941601559; 54°24′21″N 2°56′05″W	1245538	Upload Photo
Wordsworth Group of Graves in Churchyard of Church of St Oswald	Grasmere, Lakes	Gravestone		15 March 1974	NY3377107398; 54°27′27″N 3°01′23″W	1272008	Wordsworth Group of Graves in Churchyard of Church of St Oswald
Nether Levens Farmhouse and attached Store to North	Levens	Farmhouse	Early 16th century	21 November 1952	SD4882785119; 54°15′33″N 2°47′13″W	1319030	Upload Photo
Old Stables about 50m North East of Levens Hall, Cottages attached to North West and South; and Gate Piers Attache	Levens	House	Mid C20	21 November 1952	SD4958785150; 54°15′34″N 2°46′31″W	1318992	Upload Photo
Priory Close House	Cartmel, Lower Allithwaite	House	Possibly Medieval	25 March 1970	SD3792678796; 54°12′04″N 2°57′11″W	1348727	Priory Close House More images
Priory Gatehouse, Including East Bay of Gatehouse	Cartmel, Lower Allithwaite	School	1624	25 March 1970	SD3782278787; 54°12′04″N 2°57′17″W	1348693	Priory Gatehouse, Including East Bay of Gatehouse More images
Wraysholme Tower	Flookburgh, Lower Allithwaite	Farmhouse	17th century	25 March 1970	SD3831875420; 54°10′15″N 2°56′47″W	1100320	Wraysholme Tower More images
Canon Winder Hall	Flookburgh, Lower Holker	Farmhouse	16th century	18 May 1953	SD3514774718; 54°09′51″N 2°59′41″W	1335840	Canon Winder Hall More images
Cark Hall, North Cottage, South Cottage	Cark in Cartmel, Lower Holker	House	1580	18 May 1953	SD3651676741; 54°10′57″N 2°58′27″W	1087146	Cark Hall, North Cottage, South Cottage More images
Church of St John Baptist	Flookburgh, Lower Holker	Church	1777	25 March 1970	SD3654976019; 54°10′34″N 2°58′25″W	1087115	Church of St John Baptist More images
Holker Hall and Terrace Wall Approximately 70 Metres to Garden to South East	Holker, Lower Holker	Apartment	1970	25 March 1970	SD3590977383; 54°11′17″N 2°59′01″W	1335814	Holker Hall and Terrace Wall Approximately 70 Metres to Garden to South East More images
Manor House and Adjoining Outbuilding	Flookburgh, Lower Holker	House	1686	25 March 1970	SD3679575837; 54°10′28″N 2°58′11″W	1335820	Upload Photo
Lowick Hall	Lowick	House	Mid 18th century	25 March 1970	SD2858685956; 54°15′51″N 3°05′52″W	1086795	Lowick Hall More images
Curtain Wall to South-west of Middleton Hall	Middleton	Privy House	Mid 15th century	12 February 1962	SD6268287426; 54°16′52″N 2°34′29″W	1146448	Upload Photo
Curtain Wall to West and North West and Barn to North West of Middleton Hall	Middleton	Curtain Wall	Mid 15th century	12 February 1962	SD6267687458; 54°16′53″N 2°34′29″W	1086862	Upload Photo
Middleton Hall	Middleton	Farmhouse	Late 14th century	21 November 1952	SD6269687441; 54°16′52″N 2°34′28″W	1086861	Middleton Hall More images
Outbuilding adjoining North East angle of Middleton Hall and adjoining Wall	Middleton	Farmhouse	Early to Mid 15th century	21 November 1952	SD6269787455; 54°16′53″N 2°34′28″W	1146424	Upload Photo
Roman Milestone approx. 74m to West of Road	Middleton	Milestone	Roman	12 February 1962	SD6226385883; 54°16′02″N 2°34′51″W	1086866	Roman Milestone approx. 74m to West of Road More images
Church of St Mark	Natland, Natland	Parish Church	1909-1910	19 July 1984	SD5210789200; 54°17′46″N 2°44′14″W	1137760	Church of St Mark More images
Blease Hall	Old Hutton and Holmescales	House	c. 1600	21 November 1952	SD5492589167; 54°17′46″N 2°41′39″W	1312207	Blease Hall More images
Tower of Chapel of St Margaret	Over Staveley	Tower	1388	12 February 1962	SD4713698176; 54°22′35″N 2°48′55″W	1086550	Tower of Chapel of St Margaret More images
Preston Patrick Hall	Preston Patrick	House	15th century or early 16th century	21 November 1952	SD5443083748; 54°14′51″N 2°42′03″W	1312117	Preston Patrick Hall More images
Graythwaite Old Hall	Graythwaite, Satterthwaite	House	16th century or 17th century	18 May 1953	SD3720290891; 54°18′35″N 2°58′00″W	1087200	Graythwaite Old Hall More images
Abbot Holme Bridge	Dentdale, Sedbergh	Road Bridge	Probably 17th century	14 June 1984	SD6488890827; 54°18′43″N 2°32′28″W	1384064	Abbot Holme Bridge More images
Archer's Hall	Millthrop, Sedbergh	Farmhouse	1681	16 March 1954	SD6585791111; 54°18′52″N 2°31′35″W	1384200	Upload Photo
Chapel at Sedbergh School	Sedbergh Town, Sedbergh	School	1897	14 June 1984	SD6579691770; 54°19′13″N 2°31′38″W	1384171	Chapel at Sedbergh School More images
The Old Grammar School (now the School Library)	Sedbergh	School	1954	16 March 1954	SD6577592030; 54°19′22″N 2°31′40″W	1384071	The Old Grammar School (now the School Library) More images
Crook of Lune Bridge	Howgill, Sedbergh	Bridge	16th century or earlier	16 March 1954	SD6203396312; 54°21′39″N 2°35′09″W	1384145	Crook of Lune Bridge More images
High Oaks	Marthwaite, Sedbergh	Kitchen	19th century	16 March 1954	SD6270791076; 54°18′50″N 2°34′29″W	1384164	Upload Photo
Hollin Hill Farmhouse	Soolbank, Sedbergh	Farmhouse	1712	14 June 1984	SD6745192880; 54°19′50″N 2°30′07″W	1384082	Upload Photo
Mire House	Sedbergh	Farmhouse	17th century	14 June 1984	SD6915194276; 54°20′35″N 2°28′34″W	1384111	Upload Photo
Stone Hall	Soolbank, Sedbergh	Farmhouse	1695	16 March 1954	SD6717292786; 54°19′46″N 2°30′23″W	1384219	Upload Photo
The Hill	Marthwaite, Sedbergh	House	Altered post 1712	16 March 1954	SD6258690550; 54°18′33″N 2°34′36″W	1384166	Upload Photo
Thorns Hall and attached Stable Wing to Rear	Soolbank, Sedbergh	House	Probably early to mid 17th century	16 March 1954	SD6636892158; 54°19′26″N 2°31′07″W	1384176	Thorns Hall and attached Stable Wing to Rear More images
War Memorial Cloister at Sedbergh School	Sedbergh	War Memorial	1924	14 June 1984	SD6552891912; 54°19′18″N 2°31′53″W	1384218	War Memorial Cloister at Sedbergh School More images
Barn End, Bull Close, Bull Close Cottage	Skelwith Fold, Skelwith	House	Late 17th century	25 March 1970	NY3473402469; 54°24′48″N 3°00′26″W	1121997	Upload Photo
Newby Bridge	Newby Bridge, Staveley-in-Cartmel	Bridge	Before 17th century	25 March 1970	SD3690186359; 54°16′08″N 2°58′13″W	1225523	Newby Bridge More images
Burneside Hall	Strickland Roger	House	Later than 14th century	21 November 1952	SD5099195934; 54°21′24″N 2°45′20″W	1289216	Burneside Hall More images
Hoathwaite Farmhouse and Outbuildings	Torver	Farmhouse	Late 17th century	22 September 1987	SD2959694927; 54°20′42″N 3°05′04″W	1087210	Upload Photo
Barrow Monument	Ulverston	Commemorative Monument	1850	2 March 1950	SD2946079072; 54°12′09″N 3°04′58″W	1375003	Barrow Monument More images
Church of St Mary	Ulverston	Parish Church	16th century	2 March 1950	SD2889978685; 54°11′56″N 3°05′29″W	1374977	Church of St Mary More images
Conishead Priory	Ulverston	House	Earlier	2 March 1950	SD3040375826; 54°10′25″N 3°04′04″W	1270176	Conishead Priory More images
Friends Meeting House	Ulverston	Meeting Hall	1996	2 March 1950	SD2837876875; 54°10′57″N 3°05′56″W	1270207	Friends Meeting House More images
Swarthmoor Hall	Ulverston	House	Early 17th century	2 March 1950	SD2818677293; 54°11′11″N 3°06′07″W	1270174	Swarthmoor Hall More images
Henry's Castle	Underbarrow and Bradleyfield	House	Late medieval	24 March 2026	SD4749691126; 54°18′47″N 2°48′31″W	1490336	Henry's Castle More images
Barrow Wife	Upper Allithwaite	House	1987	25 March 1970	SD4068284824; 54°15′20″N 2°54′43″W	1225720	Barrow Wife More images
Monument to John Wilkinson approx. 17m north of Junction with Dixon Wood Close	Lindale, Upper Allithwaite	Commemorative Monument	1808	25 March 1970	SD4184280331; 54°12′55″N 2°53′36″W	1266208	Monument to John Wilkinson approx. 17m north of Junction with Dixon Wood Close More images
Selside Hall and attached Outbuilding	Whitwell and Selside	House	Late 14th century	21 November 1952	SD5345999043; 54°23′05″N 2°43′05″W	1311671	Upload Photo
Causeway Farmhouse	Windermere	Farmhouse	Mid 17th century	8 May 1950	NY4154600045; 54°23′33″N 2°54′06″W	1124676	Upload Photo
Far Orest Old Farm Cottage	Troutbeck, Windermere	House	17th century	20 February 1982	NY4128900786; 54°23′57″N 2°54′21″W	1124758	Upload Photo
Far Orrest Old Farm Cottage	Troutbeck, Windermere	House	17th century porch / open store	20 February 1982	NY4128000785; 54°23′57″N 2°54′22″W	1255499	Upload Photo
Ferry Cottage, Low Miller Ground	Windermere	House	17th century	8 May 1950	SD4026098841; 54°22′54″N 2°55′17″W	1124747	Upload Photo
Helm Farmhouse, and Helm Farm Cottage, with attached Barn	Bowness on Windermere, Windermere	Farmhouse	1692	8 May 1950	SD4128796987; 54°21′54″N 2°54′18″W	1124691	Upload Photo
High Miller Ground	Windermere	House	18th century	8 May 1950	SD4038998858; 54°22′54″N 2°55′10″W	1203436	Upload Photo
Longmire	Troutbeck, Windermere	House	17th century	8 May 1950	NY4140401935; 54°24′34″N 2°54′15″W	1124753	Upload Photo
Near Orrest Farmhouse	Windermere	Farmhouse	16th century	8 May 1950	NY4187500202; 54°23′38″N 2°53′48″W	1124677	Upload Photo
Rayrigg Hall Farmhouse	Windermere	Farmhouse	Early 18th century	8 May 1950	SD4027498095; 54°22′29″N 2°55′15″W	1332567	Upload Photo
Rayrigg Hall	Windermere	House	Early 18th century	8 May 1950	SD4028898088; 54°22′29″N 2°55′15″W	1124746	Upload Photo
Rectory (St Martin's)	Bowness-on-Windermere, Windermere	Vicarage	16th century	8 May 1950	SD3990896210; 54°21′28″N 2°55′34″W	1124688	Rectory (St Martin's) More images
Storrs Hall	Bowness on Windermere, Windermere	Country House	18th century	8 May 1950	SD3926294135; 54°20′21″N 2°56′09″W	1332564	Storrs Hall More images
Storrs Temple	Storrs Hall, Windermere	Garden House	1804	8 May 1950	SD3904594103; 54°20′20″N 2°56′20″W	1124742	Storrs Temple More images
Church of St Paul	Witherslack	Church	1664-1671	12 February 1962	SD4317484191; 54°15′01″N 2°52′25″W	1087094	Church of St Paul More images
