= St Andrew's Church, Dacre =

Coordinates: 54.6320°N 2.8380°W

St Andrew's Church
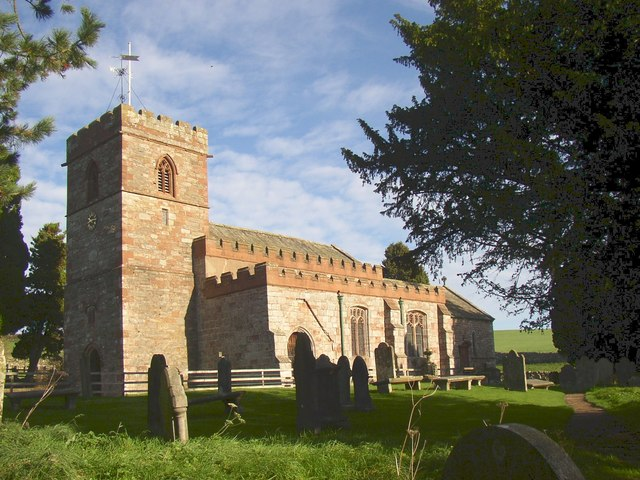
- St Andrew's Church from the southwest

- Location in Eden, Cumbria Location in Cumbria, England
- OS grid reference: NY 460 266
- Location: Dacre, Cumbria
- Country: England
- Denomination: Anglican
- Website: St Andrew, Dacre

History
- Status: Parish church
- Dedication: Saint Andrew

Architecture
- Functional status: Active
- Heritage designation: Grade I
- Designated: 27 December 1967
- Architectural type: Church
- Style: Norman, Gothic

Specifications
- Materials: Sandstone, slate roofs

Administration
- Province: York
- Diocese: Carlisle
- Archdeaconry: Carlisle
- Deanery: Penrith
- Parish: Dacre

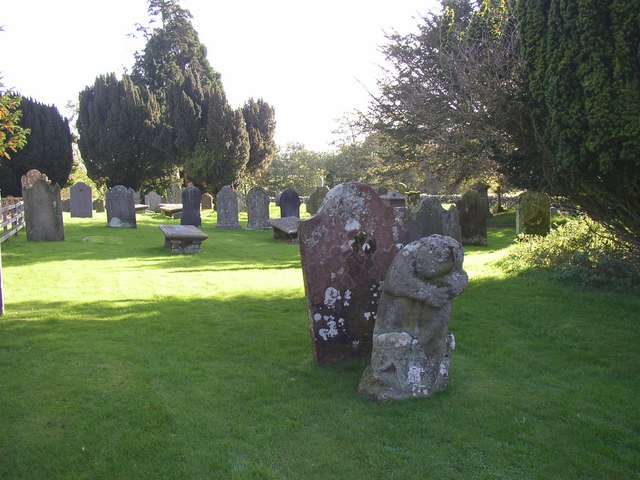
Churchyard showing one of the Dacre Bears

St Andrew's Church is in the village of Dacre, Cumbria, England. It is an active Anglican parish church in the deanery of Penrith, the archdeaconry of Penrith, and the diocese of Carlisle. The church is recorded in the National Heritage List for England as a designated Grade I listed building. The church stands near Dacre Castle.

== History ==
The presence of a monastery on the site was recorded in the 8th and again in the 10th century. The church dates from the 12th century, with additions in the following century. The tower was rebuilt in 1810. Repairs were carried out to the church in 1854, and it was restored in 1874–75.

== Architecture ==
=== Exterior ===
The church is constructed in sandstone with green slate roofs. Its plan consists of a three-bay nave with a clerestory and north and south aisles, a three-bay chancel with a north vestry, and a west tower. The tower is in three stages, with a west door, above which is the re-used head of a 13th-century two-light window. The bell openings have two lights, and the parapet is battlemented. The parapets of the aisle and nave are also battlemented. In both the north and south walls of the aisles are 19th-century two-light windows, and a 13th-century doorway, the one on the north side being blocked. The clerestory windows also have two lights. The chancel has 12th-century round-headed windows, a priest's door, one 13th-century window, and a 19th-century three-light east window. The two-light window in the vestry contains re-used medieval tracery.

=== Interior ===
Inside the church is a Norman tower arch. The arcades have pointed arches carried on round and octagonal piers. The present chancel arch dates from the 19th century. On a window sill is a fragment of stone with zigzag carving, which is probably from the original chancel arch. In the chancel is a 12th-century piscina. Among the monuments are memorials to the Hasell family of Dalemain, including one to Edward Hasell, who died in 1825, by Francis Chantrey depicting a weeping woman. There is also a 14th-century effigy of a knight. In the church are two carved cross-shaft fragments, the smaller of which depicts a winged beast with a human face that has been dated to the 9th century. The other, dating from the 10th or 11th century, depicts beasts and people. Most of the stained glass is by Clayton and Bell; a window of 1947 in the south wall is by Leonard Evetts. There is also etched glass by Laurence Whistler commemorating Sylvia McCosh of Dalemain (died 1991). William Whitelaw, 1st Viscount Whitelaw (died 1999), the former Home Secretary and MP for Penrith, is buried in the graveyard. The date and maker of the two-manual pipe organ are unknown.

== External features ==
In the churchyard are four carved statues, the Dacre Bears, standing upright in different postures. They date from the medieval period, are in red sandstone, and each is about 4 feet (1.2 m) high. They are thought to stand in the four corners of the original churchyard, but otherwise their meaning and purpose is unknown. Each bear is listed at Grade II*. Also in the churchyard is a sandstone alms table supported by six pillars. It contains a brass sundial with an inscription containing the date 1732–3, but no gnomon. It is listed at Grade II.

== See also ==
- Grade I listed churches in Cumbria
- Grade I listed buildings in Cumbria
- Listed buildings in Dacre, Cumbria
