= Dacre Bears =

Grade II* listed statues in Cumbria, England

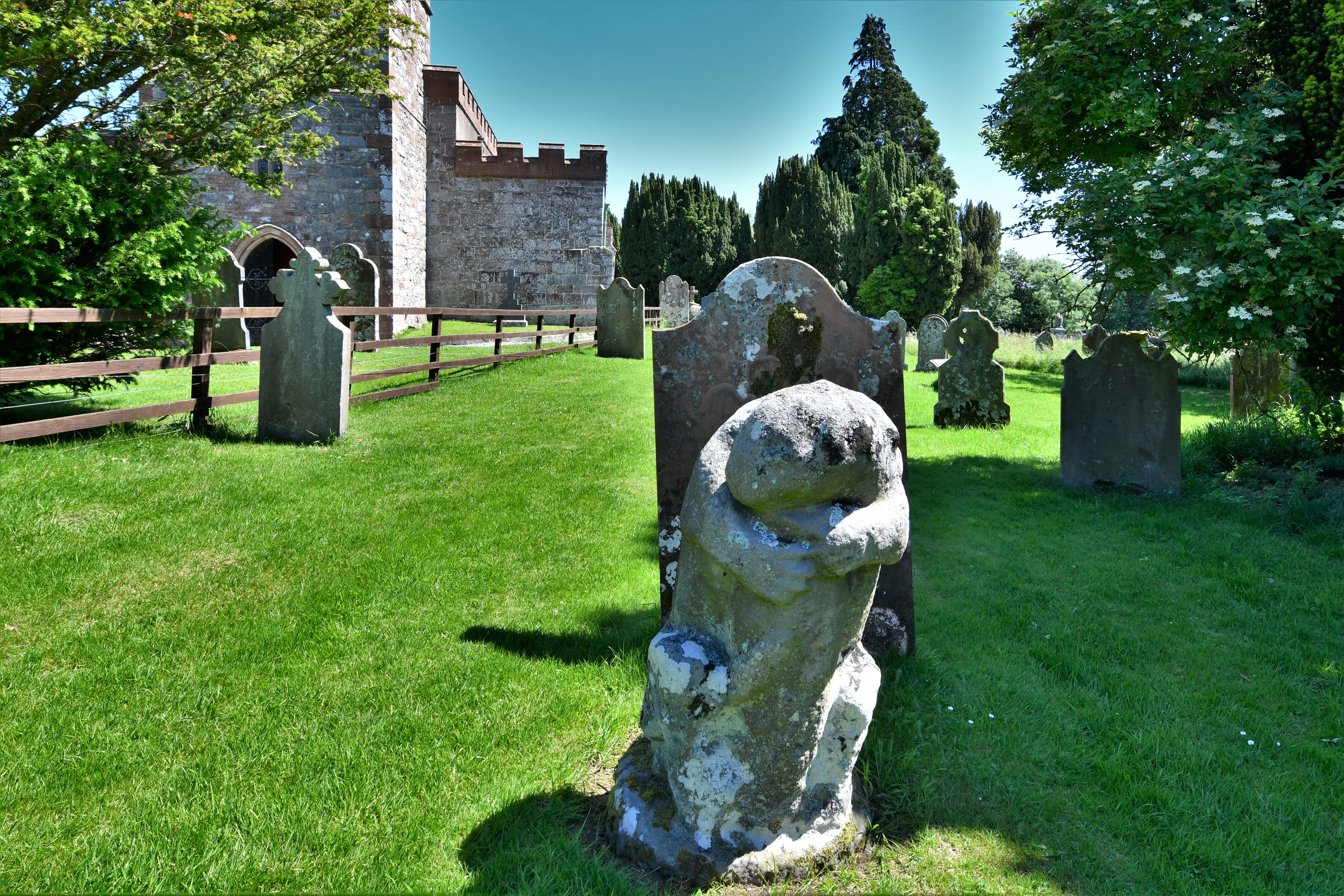
- One of the bears in the churchyard of St Andrew's

- Location within Cumbria
- 54.6321°N 2.8376°W
- Type: Statues
- Location: Dacre, Cumbria

History
- Built: Middle Ages, though possibly earlier

Listed Building – Grade II*
- Official name: Carved Bear north-east of the Church of St Andrew
- Designated: 24 October 1986
- Reference no.: 1252583

Listed Building – Grade II*
- Official name: Carved Bear south-east of the Church of St Andrew
- Designated: 24 October 1986
- Reference no.: 1252582

Listed Building – Grade II*
- Official name: Carved Bear south-west of the Church of St Andrew
- Designated: 24 October 1986
- Reference no.: 1262197

Listed Building – Grade II*
- Official name: Carved Bear north-west of the Church of St Andrew
- Designated: 24 October 1986
- Reference no.: 1145532

The Dacre Bears are four sculptures, likely of medieval date, which stand in the churchyard of the Church of St Andrew in the village of Dacre, Cumbria, England. Their date of construction is uncertain and their purpose is unknown. The statues are heavily eroded. Each is a Grade II* listed structure.

== History and description ==
Historic England dates the Dacre Bears to the medieval period and records them as each standing about 4 ft high and carved from Red sandstone, which is now heavily weathered. It suggests that their present placement is original, at each of the four corners of the medieval churchyard. (Note: An alternative suggestion, drawing on the interpretation that the sculptures show lions, rather than bears, is that they were heraldic devices and may have originally been sited at the adjacent Dacre Castle.) (Note: The Victoria and Albert Museum holds a set of four animalistic heraldry devices, the Dacre Beasts. Depicting a griffin, a ram, a bull and a dolphin, they originally decorated the great hall at Naworth Castle.) The bears were first studied in the 18th century by William Nicolson, Bishop of Carlisle who was also a keen amateur antiquary. It was Nicolson who first deemed the sculptures to represent bears, suggesting they were a heraldic device showing the Bear and Ragged Staff emblem of the Earls of Warwick. However, the statues long predate the emblem. In the 19th century the bears were studied and described by Richard Saul Ferguson, another local antiquarian, who also served as the chancellor of the Diocese of Carlisle. Ferguson suggested that the statues tell a story. Beginning with the bear in the north-west corner of the churchyard and moving south-west, south-east and finally north-east, Ferguson contended that the first sculpture represented a bear in repose; the second, the bear turning its head as a small, cat-like, animal attacks it by climbing onto its back; the third a struggle between the two; and the fourth, the bear, victorious and replete, with a satisfied smile on its face having overcome and eaten its enemy. A recent archaeological survey disputes Historic England's dating, suggesting instead that the sculptures predate the Anglo-Saxon period and may represent evidence of a pagan religious site. Close study of the fourth sculpture has also called into question the identification of the statues as bears. The best-preserved of the quartet, it appears to have a mane and a tail, suggesting that the statues may have been intended to depict lions. (Note: Mathew Hyde, in his Cumbria Pevsner, also suggests that the fourth statue resembles a lion.)

Matthew Hyde, in his Cumbria: Cumberland, Westmorland and Furness volume in the Pevsner Buildings of England series, revised and reissued in 2010, describes the bears as; "sinister, troll-like creatures" and concludes, "their age is unknowable, as is their identity - and their meaning". The bears have individual Grade II* listings.

== Gallery ==
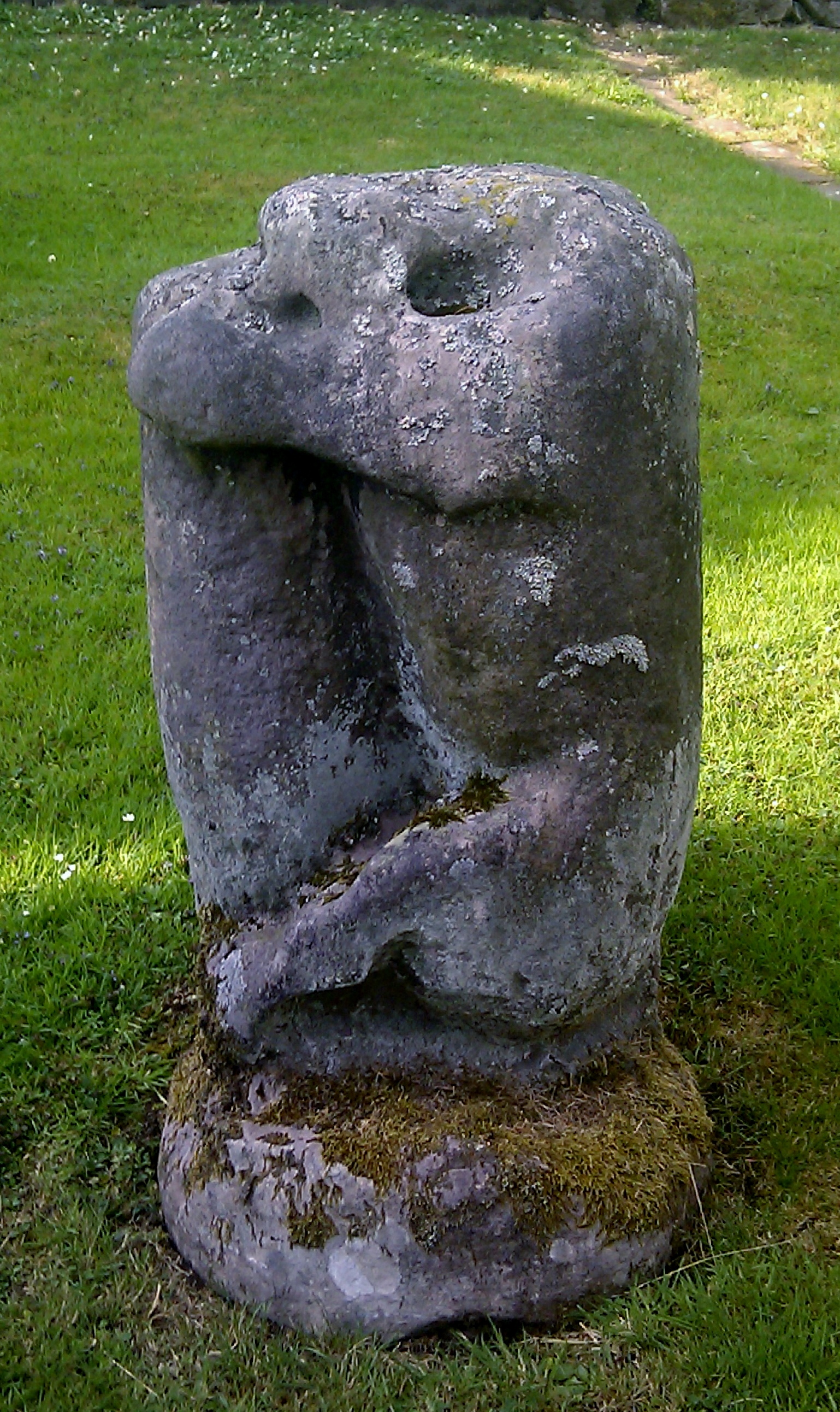
First bear

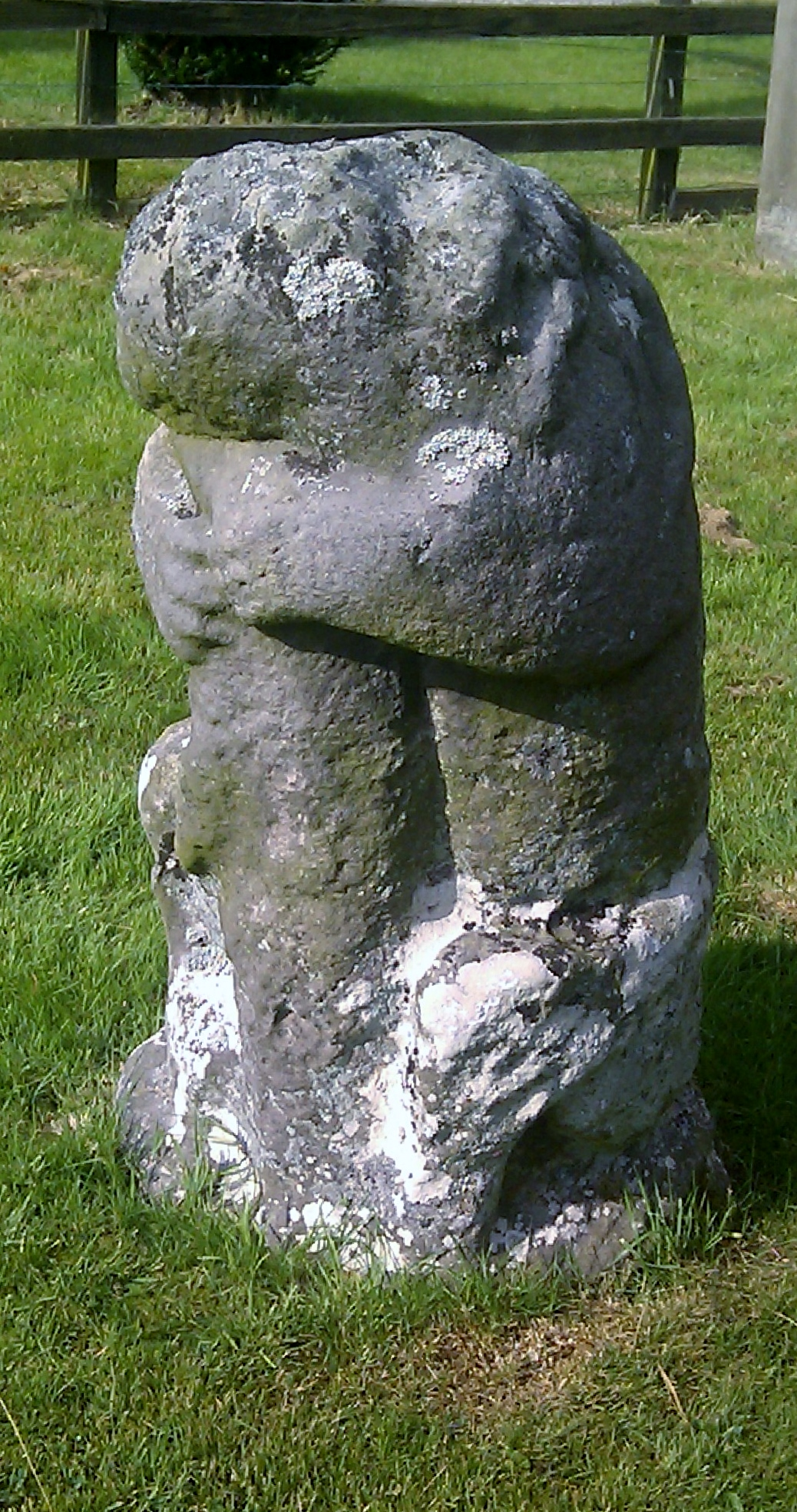
Second bear

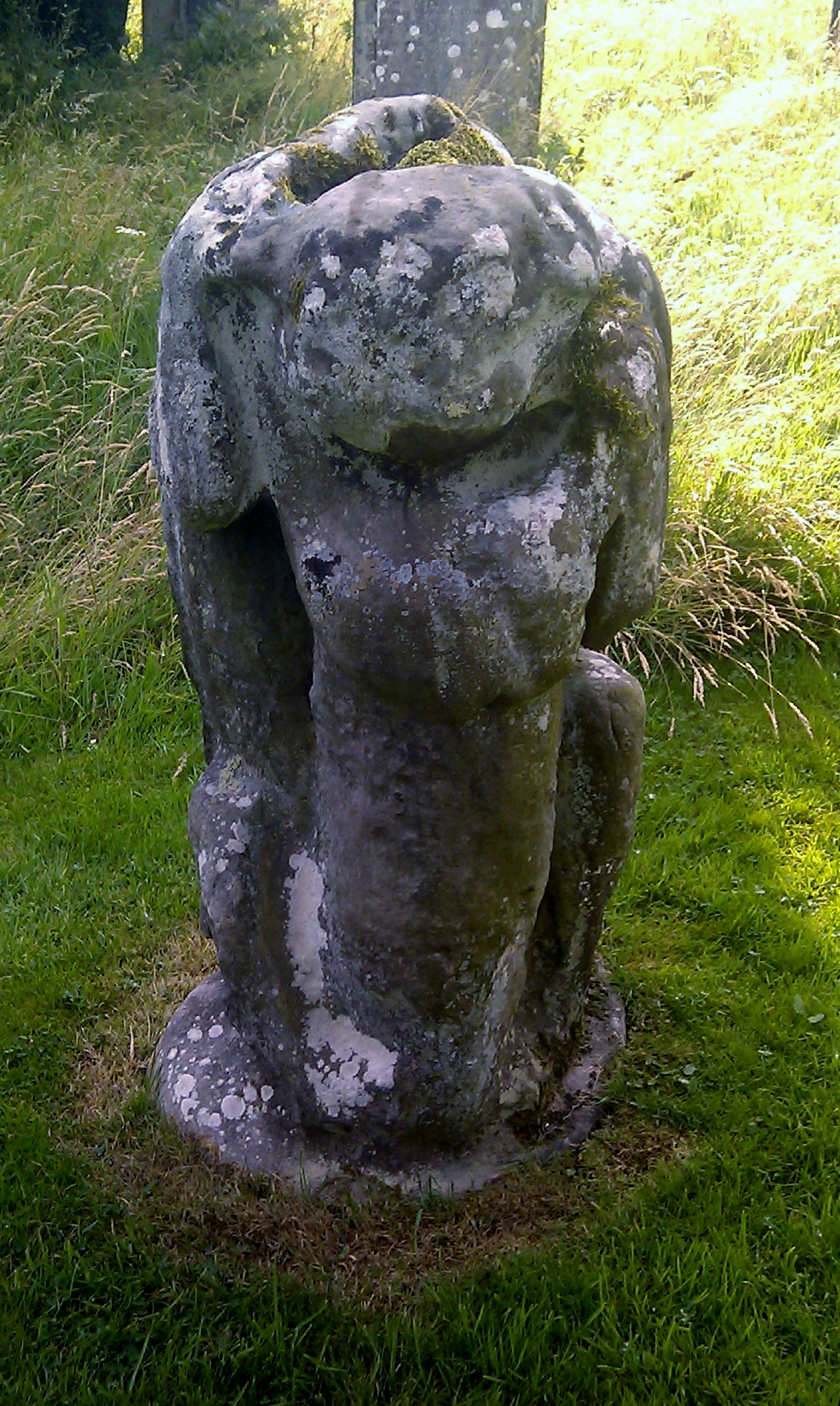
Third bear

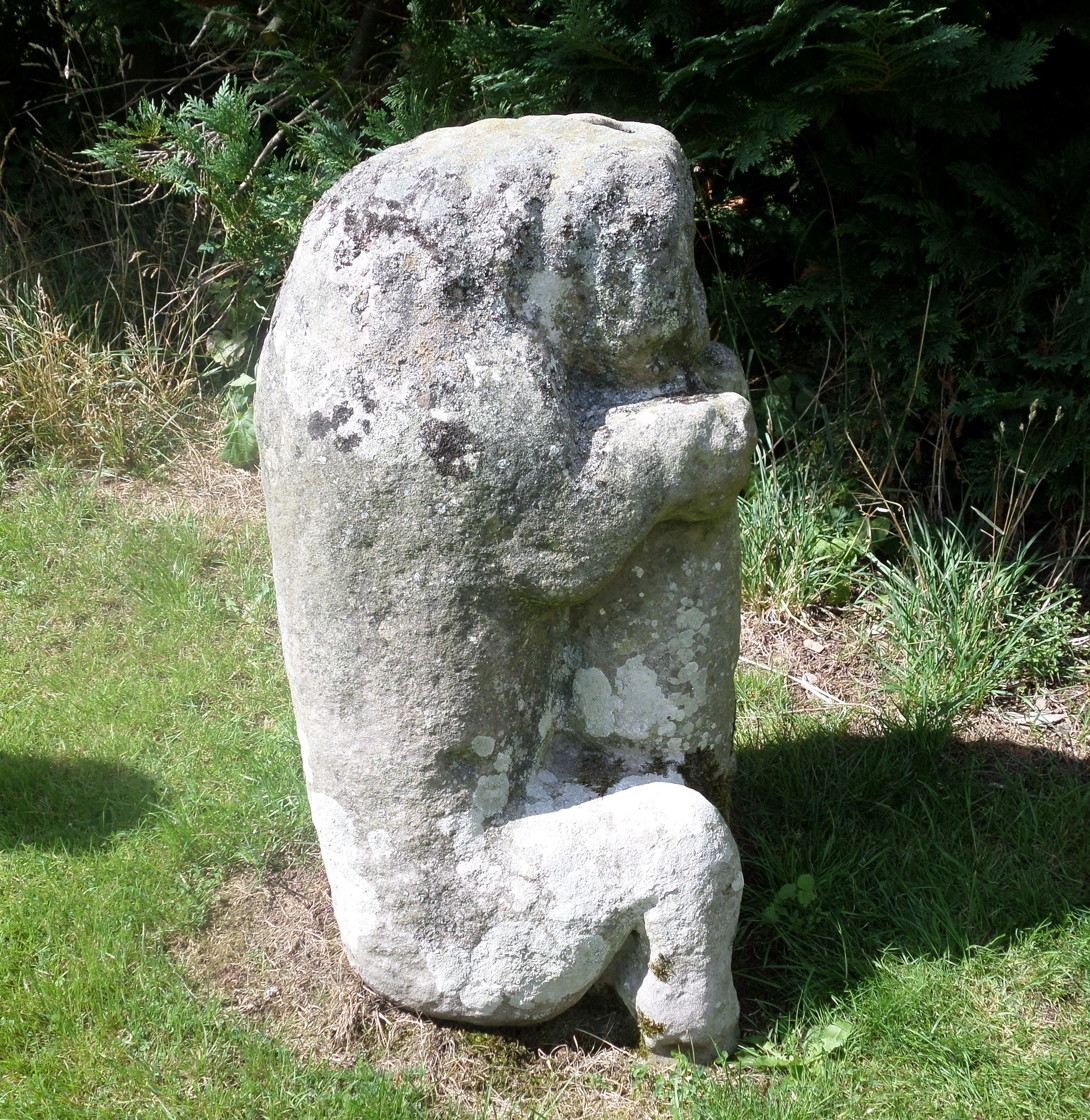
Fourth bear

== Sources ==
- Donaghy, Peter; Laidler, John (2001). Lakeland Church Walks. Wilmslow, Cheshire: Sigma Press. ISBN 978-1-850-58761-3.
- Hyde, Matthew; Pevsner, Nikolaus (2010). Cumbria: Cumberland, Westmorland and Furness. Pevsner Buildings of England. New Haven, US and London: Yale University Press. ISBN 978-0-300-12663-1. OCLC 601347572.

== See also ==
- Listed buildings in Dacre, Cumbria
- Grade II* listed buildings in Westmorland and Furness
