= St Mark's Church, Natland =

Coordinates: 54.2961°N 2.7374°W

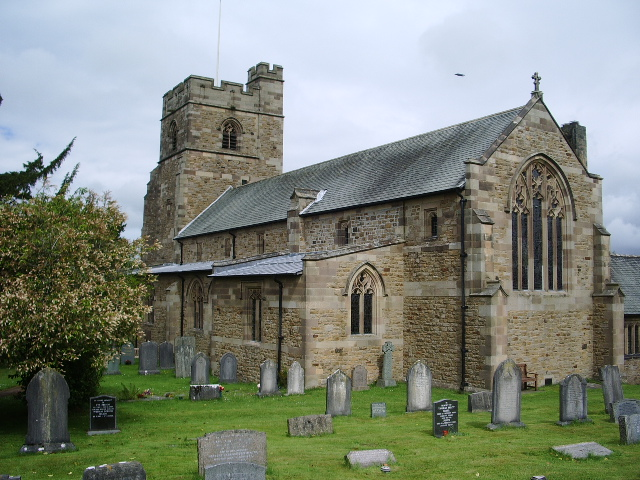
- St Mark's Church, Natland, from the southeast

- Location in Cumbria
- OS grid reference: SD 521,892
- Location: Natland, Cumbria
- Country: England
- Denomination: Anglican
- Website: www.stmarkschurchnatland.co.uk

History
- Status: Parish church
- Founded: 1246
- Dedication: Saint Mark
- Consecrated: 7 November 1910

Architecture
- Functional status: Active
- Heritage designation: Grade II*
- Designated: 19 July 1984
- Architect: Austin and Paley
- Architectural type: Church
- Style: Gothic Revival
- Groundbreaking: 1909
- Completed: 1910

Specifications
- Materials: Sandstone, slate roofs

Administration
- Province: York
- Diocese: Carlisle
- Archdeaconry: Westmorland and Furness
- Deanery: Kendal
- Parish: Natland

Clergy
- Vicar: Vacant

St Mark's Church is in the village of Natland, Cumbria, England. It is an active Anglican parish church in the deanery of Kendal, the archdeaconry of Westmorland and Furness, and the diocese of Carlisle. The church is recorded in the National Heritage List for England as a designated Grade II* listed building.

== History ==
The first church in the village was built in 1246, and this was replaced by a new church on a different site in 1735. This was replaced again in 1825 on the site of the present church. This church was designed by the Kendal architect George Webster. As the size of the local population increased, the church became inadequate for its congregation, and in 1908 it was decided to demolish it and replace it with a larger building. The Lancaster architects Austin and Paley were commissioned to design the new church. The foundation stone was laid on 29 June 1909, and the new church was consecrated by the bishop of Carlisle on 7 November 1910. It provided seating for 259 people, and cost about £5,000 (equivalent to £650,000 in 2025).

== Architecture ==
=== Exterior ===
St Mark's is constructed in Lancaster sandstone and in stone from Darley Dale. It is roofed with green slate, and has a stone ridge. Its architectural style is late Decorated-early Perpendicular. The plan consists of a four-bay nave, north and south aisles, a south porch, a three-bay chancel with a vestry to the north, and a west tower. The tower is in three stages on a plinth with diagonal buttresses, and has a battlemented parapet, At the northeast corner of the tower is a stair turret, also battlemented, that rises higher than the tower. The windows on the sides of the church have two lights, the east window has five lights, and all are under pointed heads.

=== Interior ===
The porch leads into the base of the tower. Between the entrance and the font is a large round column, the south pier of the tower; the north pier is built into the wall. The arcades are carried on alternate round and octagonal piers, the capitals being decorated with carved square flowers. The altar rails, the stalls, the pulpit, the pews, and the font were all designed by Austin and Paley. The font is carved from a single piece of stone. The stained glass in the east window is a memorial to the Second World War; it was designed by Gerald E. R. Smith and made in the studio of A. K. Nicholson. In the south wall is a window designed for the Millennium by Sarah Sutton that depicts Adam lay ybounden. The two-manual pipe organ was made by Conacher of Huddersfield, and was partly rebuilt in 1987 by Holmes and Swift.

=== Appraisal ===
This was the last major village church to be designed by the practice before the death of Hubert Austin. It received praise from the architectural historian Nikolaus Pevsner who said it was "as good as any of the churches by the best church architects of those years, say Temple Moore". Assessing the plans for the Incorporated Church Building society in 1908 J Oldrid Scott and C. Hodgson Fowler stated "Highly approved".

== See also ==
- Grade II* listed buildings in Westmorland and Furness
- Listed buildings in Natland
- List of works by George Webster
- List of ecclesiastical works by Austin and Paley (1895–1914)
