= Listed buildings in Natland =

Natland is a civil parish in the Westmorland and Furness district of Cumbria, England. It contains 14 listed buildings that are recorded in the National Heritage List for England. Of these, one is listed at Grade II*, the middle of the three grades, and the others are at Grade II, the lowest grade. The parish contains the village of Natland, and is otherwise rural. The listed buildings include houses, farmhouses, farm buildings, bridges, a church, a milestone, and a boundary post.

== Key ==
| Grade | Criteria |
|---|---|
| II* | Particularly important buildings of more than special interest |
| II | Buildings of national importance and special interest |

== Buildings ==
| Name and location | Photograph | Date | Notes | Grade |
|---|---|---|---|---|
| The Abbey; 54.29564°N 2.73668°W | — | 16th century | The house was refurbished in the 17th century, and there have been later alterations. It is roughcast with a green slate roof, and has an irregular H-plan. There are two storeys, a 20th-century lean-to porch, and the types of windows vary, some being sashes, and others casements. | II |
| High House Farmhouse; 54.29381°N 2.73397°W | — | 17th century | The farmhouse is in stone on a plinth, and has a slate roof with a stone ridge. There are two storeys with attics, and an L-shaped plan, with a part-circular stair projection in the angle. The windows are mixed; some are sashes, of which some are horizontally sliding, and others are casements. | II |
| Natland Hall and outbuildings 54.29649°N 2.73942°W | — | 17th century | A stone farmhouse on a plinth that has a green slate roof with a stone ridge. There are two storeys with attics and six bays, the left two projecting forward as a wing. The windows are sashes, and above the doorway is a timber slated canopy. | II |
| Natland Mill Beck Farmhouse and cottage 54.31010°N 2.73867°W | — | 17th century | Originally one house, later divided into a house and a cottage, it is in stone with a green slate roof. There are two storeys with attics, and the entrance front facing the garden has three bays. The windows are casements, and in the roof is a gabled dormer. | II |
| Hawes Bridge; 54.29500°N 2.75195°W | | 18th century (probable) | The bridge carries a road over a gorge containing the River Kent. It is in limestone with a curved plan, and consists of two arches with a narrow carriageway. On the upstream side is a large triangular cutwater. | II |
| Cow house and stables, Natland Hall; 54.29659°N 2.74005°W | — | 18th century (probable) | Originally a barn later a cow house, stables later a hen house, and a stable with a hayloft, forming an L-shaped plan. The earliest part is the west wing, the north wing being added in the early 19th century. It is in stone, and has a green slate roof with a stone ridge and a finial on the east gable. The north wing has seven bays, and contains a cart entrance. Elsewhere there are doors, windows, and external steps leading up to a doorway. | II |
| Crowpark Bridge; 54.29525°N 2.74874°W | | 1818 | The bridge carries Hawes Lane over a part of the Lancaster Canal which is now dry. It is in limestone and consists of a single flattened elliptical arch. The bridge has rusticated voussoirs, keystones, and shallow arched parapets. The carriageway is about 12 feet (3.7 m) wide. | II |
| Natland Hall Bridge; 54.29879°N 2.74653°W | | 1818 | This was an accommodation bridge over a part of the Lancaster Canal which is now dry. It is in limestone and consists of a single elliptical arch. The bridge has rusticated voussoirs, keystones, a string course, and coping. The parapets are curved in plan and the carriageway between them is about 10 feet (3.0 m) wide. | II |
| Helme Lodge; 54.30789°N 2.73975°W | — | 1824–27 | A country house by Francis and George Webster in Greek Revival style. A verandah was added in about 1914, and the west side was remodelled in 1916 following a fire. It is in limestone with sandstone dressings, Tuscan pilasters, a modillioned cornice, an ogee gutter, and a hipped green slate roof. There are two storeys, and the entrance front has three bays, with an Ionic portico, and a door with a fanlight. The west (garden) front has three bays, stone balusters and a first-floor balcony. On the south front is a four-bay verandah, and all the windows are sashes. | II |
| Boundary Post; 54.28852°N 2.72922°W | | 1825 | The boundary post is in cast iron, and is half-hexagonal with a fluted face and a domed top. It is inscribed with the names of the parishes of Heversham and Kendal, although it now stands on the boundary between Natland and Sedgwick. | II |
| Milestone; 54.28910°N 2.72887°W | | 1826 | The milepost is in cast iron, and is half-hexagonal with a fluted face and a domed top. It is inscribed with the distances in miles to Kendal and to Burton. | II |
| Barn, High House Farm; 54.29365°N 2.73375°W | — | Early 19th century (probable) | The barn incorporates a cow shed, a hay loft and a cartshed, and forms an L-shaped plan. It is in stone with limestone quoins and voussoirs, and has a slate roof. | II |
| St Mark's Church; 54.29613°N 2.73739°W | | 1909–10 | The church was designed by Hubert Austin in Perpendicular style, and replaced an earlier church on the site. It is built in sandstone and has a green slate roof with a stone ridge. The church consists of a nave with a clerestory, north and south aisles, a chancel with a north vestry and a south chapel, and a west tower. The tower has three stages, it stands on a plinth, and has an embattled south porch, diagonal buttresses, a taller embattled stair tower at the northeast, string courses, and an embattled parapet. | II* |
| War memorial 54.29617°N 2.73772°W | — | 1921 | The war memorial is in the churchyard of St Mark's Church to the west of the church tower. It is in stone, and has a lantern head with blank openings on each face. This is surmounted by a Latin cross, and it stands on a slender shaft on a moulded plinth on a three-stepped square base. There is an inscription on the plinth, and bronze plaques nearby on the church wall containing the names of those lost in the two World Wars. | II |
