= Listed buildings in Dacre, Cumbria =

Dacre is a civil parish ink Westmorland and Furness, Cumbria, England. It contains 68 listed buildings that are recorded in the National Heritage List for England. Of these, three are listed at Grade I, the highest of the three grades, five are at Grade II*, the middle grade, and the others are at Grade II, the lowest grade. The parish contains the villages of Dacre, Stainton, Great Blencow, and Newbiggin and the surrounding countryside. Unusual listed features in the parish include three folly farmhouses built to resemble forts for the 11th Duke of Norfolk, and the Dacre Bears, four statues of bears in the churchyard of St Andrew's Church. Most of the other listed buildings are houses and associated structures, farmhouses and farm buildings. Other listed structures include a church and items in the churchyard, bridges, a public house, a monument, a boundary stone, a block of limekilns, and a telephone kiosk.

== Key ==
Grade	Criteria
I	Buildings of exceptional interest, sometimes considered to be internationally important
II*	Particularly important buildings of more than special interest
II	Buildings of national importance and special interest

== Buildings ==
Name and location	Photograph	Date	Notes	Grade
St Andrew's Church; 54.63199°N 2.83800°W		12th century	The church was extended in the 13th century, the tower was rebuilt in 1810, and the church was restored in the 1874–75. It is in sandstone and has green slate roofs with coped gables and a cross finial. The church consists of a nave with a clerestory, aisles, a chancel with a north vestry and a west tower. The tower has three stages, with a west doorway, and a battlemented parapet. The nave and aisles also have battlemented parapets. Inside the church, the tower arch is Norman.	I
Carved bear (northwest); 54.63206°N 2.83854°W		Medieval	One of a group of four carved bears in the churchyard of St Andrew's Church. It is in sandstone, and depicts the bear asleep with its head on a pillar, but much of the head has been worn away.	II*
Carved bear (southwest); 54.63176°N 2.83839°W		Medieval	One of a group of four carved bears in the churchyard of St Andrew's Church. It is in sandstone and about 4 feet (1.2 m) high. A small animal has jumped on to the back of the bear, and the bear's head is turned towards it.	II*
Carved bear (southeast); 54.63194°N 2.83742°W		Medieval	One of a group of four carved bears in the churchyard of St Andrew's Church. It is in sandstone and about 4 feet (1.2 m) high. The bear is making an attempt to dislodge an animal clinging to its back, by reaching over his shoulder with his right paw.	II*
Carved bear (northeast); 54.63214°N 2.83755°W		Medieval	One of a group of four carved bears in the churchyard of St Andrew's Church. It is in sandstone and about 4 feet (1.2 m) high. The bear looks satisfied, having eaten its attacker.	II*
Dacre Castle; 54.63066°N 2.83743°W		14th century	A fortified tower house that was altered in about 1570 by Thomas Lennard, 1st Earl of Sussex. It is built in sandstone on a chamfered plinth, with very think walls, a battlemented parapet, and corner turrets, two set squarely and two set diagonally. Steps lead up to a doorway, above which is a coat of arms. The windows are cross-mullioned, and in the turrets are smaller windows and arrow slits. Inside there are two principal rooms, one turret contains a staircase and there are smaller rooms on the others.	I
Dalemain; 54.63432°N 2.81124°W		15th century	A country house that was altered in 1685, and considerably extended in 1744 or 1747. The earliest part is in calciferous sandstone and the rest is in pink sandstone. The latest part, consisting of the east front and the south side, is on a chamfered plinth and has quoins, a string course, rusticated pilasters, an open balustraded parapet, and a hipped green slate roof. The east front has two storeys and nine bays, there are wings flanking a courtyard, and at the rear is a range incorporating the original house. On the front is a central doorway with fluted pilasters and a pediment, and the windows are sashes in architraves with false keystones.	I
Townhead; 54.68233°N 2.84461°W	—	Mid 16th century (probable)	A farmhouse that was altered and/or extended in 1667 and 1727, and again in the 18th and 19th centuries. It is in rendered sandstone with green slate roofs. There are two storeys and three bays, with a two-bay extension to the right, and a lower two-storey two-bay extension added further to the right in the 18th century. In the older part is a round-headed doorway with false imposts and keystone. Most of the mullions have been removed and the windows are sashes. Inside the house are back-to-back inglenooks and a bressumer.	II
Green Flat and barn 54.61514°N 2.83788°W	—	Early to mid 17th century	A farmhouse with an extension dated 1684, and a barn from the late 17th century. They are in stone with green slate roofs. The house is stuccoed, with two storeys, and both the original part, the extension, and the barn have two bays each. The doorways are Tudor arched, and above the doorway on the front of the extension is an inscribed, decorated and dated panel. The windows in the original part are mullioned, and those in the extension are sashes. The barn has plank doors and oval vents.	II
Rose Hill and former barn 54.61625°N 2.83616°W	—	Mid 17th century	The farmhouse and former barn are in stone with a green slate roof. The house has two storeys and two bays, the barn to the right has been incorporated into the house, and there is a two-storey two-bay extension at the rear, giving an L-shaped plan. The windows in the front are sashes, and in the extension is a doorway with a chamfered surround and mullioned windows.	II
Carthanet and barn 54.62195°N 2.82986°W	—	Mid or late 17th century	The farmhouse and barn are in sandstone, partly rendered, and with green slate roofs. The house has two storeys and two bays, with a two-storey two-bay extension to the rear. The windows are sashes, those in the upper floor in half-dormers. The barn to the right is lower, and has been partly converted for domestic use. It contains a cart entrance, a plank door, and casement windows. Inside the house is an inglenook, and in the roof are two pairs of upper crucks.	II
Brooklyn; 54.64477°N 2.79830°W	—	Late 17th century	Originally a farmhouse that was extended in the early 19th century and used as a private house. It has a double depth plan, the rear part incorporating the original house. The house is stuccoed, the original part has a hipped roof with local slate, and the front part has a Welsh slate roof. There are two storeys and the symmetrical front has three bays and a central doorway with moulding to the architrave and cornice. The windows throughout are sashes.	II
Waterfoot Farmhouse and barn 54.61808°N 2.83421°W	—	1678	The farmhouse is in stone with a green slate roof, and has two storeys and two bays. The doorway has a chamfered surround, a Tudor lintel and a hood mould. The windows are mullioned and contain sashes. The lower barn to the right is in mixed slate and cobble, it has a green slate roof, and has been partly converted for residential use. There are large central doors, an open gable end, and inside are two pairs of upper crucks.	II
Rose Bank; 54.63084°N 2.83955°W		1689	The house was extended in 1773. The older part is in stone, the newer part is stuccoed on a double-chamfered plinth, and has quoins, a string course, an eaves cornice, and both parts have a green slate roof. There are two storeys, and each part has two bays, forming an L-shaped plan. In the newer part steps lead up to a central doorway with a quoined surround, a keyed lintel and a pediment. The windows are sashes in stone surrounds. In the older part there is a doorway with a dated lintel, a porch, and some of the windows are mullioned.	II
Stables, Aldby Farm; 54.64217°N 2.83505°W	—	1697	Originally a house, later used as stables, the building is in limestone with sandstone dressings and a green slate roof. There are two storeys and five bays. Above the former doorway is a shaped and dated lintel. Some windows are mullioned, others are casements with the mullions removed, and above the ground floor windows is a continuous hood mould.	II
Alms table 54.63192°N 2.83842°W	—	17th or 18th century	The alms table is in the churchyard of St Andrew's Church. It is in sandstone, and consists of a flat plain slab on six shaped pillars. On the slab is a brass inscribed sundial without a gnomon.	II
2 Wood View; 54.62932°N 2.84187°W	—	1714	A former farmhouse, later used as a private house, it is in sandstone with quoins and a green slate roof. There are two storeys and three bays. The doorway has a gabled porch and an initialled and dated lintel. In the ground floor are mullioned windows and fire windows, and above the windows are sashes.	II
Aldby; 54.64196°N 2.83449°W		Early 18th century	A limestone farmhouse with sandstone dressings and a green slate roof. There are two storeys and two bays, with a lean-to extension on the left. The central doorway has a stone surround, and the windows are mullioned.	II
Spire House; 54.67353°N 2.83449°W		Early 18th century	A farmhouse that had a folly extension added in the late 18th century for the 11th Duke of Norfolk. The original part is rendered and has a Welsh slate roof with coped gables, two storeys and three bays. It has sash windows and casement fire windows. The taller extension to the right is in sandstone with quoins, a string course, an eaves cornice, and a battlemented parapet. It has a polygonal plan, and on the top is a spire on an octagonal battlemented base.	II
Sunbeam House; 54.65220°N 2.82167°W	—	Early 18th century	A whitewashed house with a green slate roof, it has two storeys, five bays and a rear extension. On the front is a gabled, porch, casement windows in chamfered surrounds, fire windows, and a continuous hood mould.	II
Sycamore House and barn 54.64612°N 2.79906°W	—	Early 18th century (probable)	The house and outbuilding are pebbledashed and have greenslate roofs. The house has two storeys and two bays, and the lower barn and stables to the right have two storeys and two bays. The door and the windows, which are sashes, have plain stone surrounds. (Note: Street View in April 2010 shows that the barn and stables have been converted for residential use.)	II
Todd Farmhouse; 54.61763°N 2.83428°W	—	Early 18th century	The farmhouse is in stone on a boulder plinth and has a green slate roof. There are two storeys and three bays. The windows are casements in chamfered surrounds, and there is a fire window. On the right return is a lean-to stone porch.	II
Ash View; 54.64596°N 2.79903°W	—	Early to mid 18th century	A stuccoed house on a chamfered plinth, with quoins, a string course, an eaves cornice, and a green slate roof. There are two storeys and three bays. The doorway has a stone surround, and the windows, which are double-sashes have chamfered surrounds. Inside the house are an inglenook and a timber-framed partition.	II
Lodge Farmhouse and barn 54.62880°N 2.84336°W	—	Early to mid 18th century	The farmhouse was extended in 1774. It is stuccoed with a green slate roof, and has two storeys and three bays with rear extensions. Some of the windows are mullioned and other are sashes. In the rear extension is a doorway with a dated lintel. The barn to the right is lower and has two storeys and two bays.	II
Sourlands Gate; 54.62370°N 2.82818°W	—	1737	A stone farmhouse with quoins and a green slate roof. There are two storeys, five bays, and a rear extension, giving an L-shaped plan. The door has a stone surround and a lintel with a dated and initialled panel. The windows on the front are mullioned, some with hood moulds, and at the rear they are a mix of sashes and casements.	II
Stables and barn, Dalemain; 54.63486°N 2.81098°W		1738	The buildings are in sandstone with quoins and green slate roofs. There are two parallel two-storey six-bay stable ranges, joined to form three sides of a courtyard by an 18th-century two-storey five-bay barn. The openings include segmental-headed entrances, a doorway with a dated lintel, mullioned windows, casement windows, loft doors, and ventilation slits.	II
School House; 54.63175°N 2.83985°W	—	1749	Originally a school, later a private house, it is roughcast with a green slate roof. The house has 1 1/2 storeys and two bays. The windows have chamfered mullions, and above them is a hood mould. In the gable end is a doorway and a sash window, both with chamfered surrounds.	II
Andrew House; 54.64257°N 2.80362°W	—	Mid 18th century	A sandstone farmhouse with a green slate roof, two storeys and four bays. The doorway has an alternate block surround and a lintel with a false keystone. The windows are sashes in stone surrounds.	II
Ash Cottage; 54.64603°N 2.79894°W	—	Mid 18th century	A rendered house with a green slate roof. It has two storeys, two bays, a central door, and sash windows.	II
Dacre Bridge; 54.63321°N 2.81127°W		18th century	Originally a road bridge, later a footbridge, it crosses Dacre Beck. The bridge is in sandstone and consists of a single segmental arch, with a hump back, and it has a solid parapet.	II
Garden wall, Dalemain; 54.63455°N 2.81200°W	—	Mid 18th century	The wall is at the rear of the house on two sides of the garden. It is partly in sandstone and partly in brick, and has flat moulded coping.	II
Horse and Farrier Inn and stables 54.63190°N 2.84002°W		Mid 18th century	The public house and adjoining stables are roughcast with a green slate roof, and the rear wall of the stables is in brick. The public house has two storeys and three bays, with a projecting gabled wing to the right. There is a porch with a hipped roof, and the windows are sashes. The stables to the left contain a segmental-headed cart entry and two doorways.	II
Town Head Farmhouse and barn 54.65312°N 2.82197°W	—	Mid 18th century	The farmhouse and barn are in stone with green slate roofs. The house has two storeys, three bays, a central gabled porch, casement windows in the ground floor, and sash windows above. The lower barn to the right has three bays, and contains a segmental-headed cart entrance, a casement window, two doors and a loft door.	II
Greystone House and barn 54.64802°N 2.79881°W	—	1752	The farmhouse and barn are in sandstone with green slate roofs. The house has quoins, a string course, and an eaves cornice. There are two storeys and two bays, with a single-bay extension to the right, and a rear outshut. The door has a fanlight and a chamfered surround, and the windows are casements. The barn to the right has two bays, and contains a plank door, ventilation slits, and a tall window.	II
Walnut House; 54.64349°N 2.79912°W	—	1754	A pebbledashed farmhouse with a green slate roof, it has two storeys and two bays. The doorway has a stone surround, and above it is a pilastered datestone, The windows are 20th-century casements in chamfered surrounds.	II
Barn, Walnut House; 54.64335°N 2.79901°W	—	Mid to late 18th century	The barn is in sandstone with a green slate roof, and has two storeys and two bays. It contains two doorways with chamfered surrounds, ventilation slits on two levels, and a cart entrance with a segmental arch.	II
Church View; 54.63294°N 2.83883°W	—	1766	Originally a farmhouse, later a private house, it is in sandstone, partly stuccoed, and has a green slate roof. There are two storeys and two bays. The central doorway has a stone surround, and the windows are mullioned, also in stone surrounds.	II
Hall Bank and barn 54.64761°N 2.79655°W	—	1769	The farmhouse and barn are pebbledashed with a Welsh slate roof. The house has two storeys and three bays. The doorway and sash windows have chamfered stone surrounds. The barn to the left has one bay, a blank front, and a doorway and loft door at the rear.	II
Rose Farmhouse; 54.63103°N 2.83989°W	—	1769	The farmhouse, later a private house, is roughcast with quoins and a green slate roof. There are two storeys and two bays, and a rear two-storey two-bay extension, giving an L-shaped plan. The doorway has a chamfered surround, and the windows, which are sashes, have plain stone surrounds.	II
Bunkers Hill and barns 54.67008°N 2.84101°W		Late 18th century	A folly farmhouse resembling a fort, built for the 11th Duke of Norfolk, and extended and altered in 1890. The buildings are in sandstone with green slate roofs. The house has quoins, string courses, a battlemented parapet, 2 1/2 storeys, and three bays. The windows are sashes in pointed arches. The house is flanked by barns, giving a U-shaped plan. The barns contain cart entrances with pointed arches and alternate block surrounds, doorways, and casement windows.	II
Fort Putnam: farmhouse, outbuildings, wall and gateway 54.67055°N 2.85118°W		Late 18th century	A folly farmhouse and outbuildings resembling a fort, built for the 11th Duke of Norfolk, it was extended and altered in the early 19th century and in 1892. The buildings are in sandstone, partly rendered, with green slate roofs. The farmhouse has a chamfered plinth, string courses, quoins, and a battlemented parapet. There are two storeys and three bays, and the outer wall is polygonal. Flanking the farmhouse are lower stables and barns, and a single-storey five-bay cow house. On the other side of the farmyard and joined to the farmhouse by an archway are barns and byres with a central turret. The outer wall of the complex forms a battlemented seven-sided curtain wall.	II*
Greystoke Pillar; 54.66021°N 2.78801°W		Late 18th century	A monument for the 11th Duke of Norfolk, it is in sandstone and consists of a tapering octagonal obelisk. This stands on a square base and a plinth that incorporates an earlier carved coat of arms.	II
High Farmhouse; 54.68501°N 2.84550°W	—	Late 18th century	The farmhouse is roughcast with an eaves cornice, and has a green slate roof with coped gables. There are two storeys, three bays, and a rear one-bay extension, giving an L-shaped plan. The doorway has an alternate block surround and a keyed lintel, and the windows are mullioned.	II
The Hill; 54.65808°N 2.82549°W	—	Late 18th century	A roughcast farmhouse with a green slate roof, it has two storeys and five bays. The central doorway and the windows, some of which are sashes and others are casements, have stone surrounds.	II
Hopland House; 54.64415°N 2.79895°W	—	Late 18th century	A rendered house with quoins and a green slate roof. There are two storeys and three bays. The doorway and the windows, which are sashes, have plain stone surrounds.	II
Midtown; 54.64535°N 2.79798°W	—	Late 18th century	The farmhouse and barn have green slate roofs. The house is stuccoed with quoins, and has two storeys and two bays. The doorway has a stone surround and a fanlight, and the windows are sashes. The barn to the right is in sandstone, and has a right-angled rear extension giving an L-shaped plan.. It contains doorways, casement windows and triangular vents.	II
Barn and domestic range, Stainton Hill; 54.64580°N 2.79891°W	—	Late 18th century	The barn has been partly converted for domestic use, and is roughcast with a green slate roof. The domestic part to the left has two storeys and two bays, and contains two doors with stone surrounds and two casement windows. The barn has an opening with a segmental arch and a false keystone and a casement window.	II
Summer House, Flusco Pike; 54.64939°N 2.83132°W		Late 18th century	The summer house is a folly on the top of a hill. It is in sandstone with quoins and a pyramidal green slate roof. It has a square plan, a doorway with a stone surround, and it consists of a single cell with a fireplace inside.	II
Waltons Place and barns 54.64692°N 2.79926°W	—	Late 18th century	The farmhouse and barn have green slate roofs. The house is roughcast, and has two storeys and two bays. Above the door is a fanlight, and the windows are sashes. The barns to the left have an L-shaped plan. They are in sandstone and contain a segmental arch, ventilation slits on two levels, and external steps leading to a loft doorway.	II
Harness room, High Farm; 54.68516°N 2.84530°W	—	1780s	The harness room is rendered with a string course, quoins and a green slate roof. It has one storey with a loft, and contains a doorway with alternate block surround and a keyed lintel. The windows are casements, and in the gable is a Diocletian window.	II
Pigeon and poultry house, High Farm; 54.68495°N 2.84603°W	—	1789	The structure is in sandstone with quoins, an eaves cornice, and a pyramidal roof. The pigeon house has one bay, two storeys, a doorway with alternate block surround, two oval openings, and a pigeon opening in the form of a Diocletian window with projecting sills on scrolled brackets. The poultry house has a single storey and contains a doorway and square openings.	II
Barn and stables, Stainton Hill; 54.64556°N 2.79879°W	—	1789	The barn and stables are roughcast with a green slate roof. They have a single storey and an L-shaped plan. In the range adjacent to the house are a door with a chamfered surround, a double door with a segmental arch, and a window with a chamfered surround. The gabled wing to the left has double doors in a segmental-arched quoined surround with a dated keystone, above which is a window with a pointed arch. On the right side are steps leading up to a loft door.	II
Mount Pleasant Farmhouse and barn 54.67662°N 2.83063°W	—	1790	The farmhouse and barn have green slate roofs, and the farmhouse was extended in the early 19th century. It is roughcast on a chamfered plinth, and has quoins, an eaves cornice, and coped gables, one with a shaped finial. There are two storeys and three bays, with a lower single-bay extension. The doorway has an alternate block surround and a dated and keyed lintel. The windows are sashes, the window above the door having a pediment. The barn is in mixed limestone and sandstone, it has two bays, and contains a segmental archway, a casement window and a large cart entrance.	II
Barn north of Mount Pleasant Farmhouse; 54.67688°N 2.83052°W	—	1791	The barn is in sandstone with quoins, and has a Welsh slate roof with coped gables. On the left gable is the base of a bellcote, now with a weathervane, and on the right gable is a ball finial. The barn has one storeys and three bays. It contains a segmental-arched cart entrance, steps leading to a loft door, and a doorway with a shaped-arch head.	II
Burbank House; 54.68641°N 2.84596°W	—	1793	Originally a grammar school, later a private house, it is in mixed limestone and sandstone on a chamfered plinth, and has quoins, an eaves cornice, and a green slate roof with coped gables. There are two storeys, six bays, and a single-storey single-bay kitchen extension. There are two doorways with alternate-block surrounds and fanlights, one of which has a re-used, initialled and dated lintel. The windows are sashes in stone surrounds, in the ground floor they have round heads, and in the upper floor the heads are flat. On the gable is a bellcote with a pyramidal roof and a greyhound weathervane.	II
Skirsgill; 54.64988°N 2.76259°W	—	1795	A country house that was remodelled in the 1840s. It is in sandstone on a chamfered plinth, and has string courses, an eaves cornice, a partly open balustraded parapet, angle pilasters rising to chimneys, and a hipped green slate roof. The main block has three storeys and seven bays, and this is flanked by two-storey single-bay wings. Steps lead up to a central door with a fanlight, a cornice on consoles, and a balustraded parapet. This is flanked by bow-fronted bay windows, and above the door is a Venetian window. In the left return is a bay window, and in the right return is a projecting round-arched porch. At the rear the wings are pedimented and between them is a gallery with seven Ionic columns, a frieze, and a modillioned cornice.	II
Terrace wall, gate posts and steps, Skirsgill; 54.64981°N 2.76246°W	—	Late 18th to early 19th century	The wall, gate posts and steps are in sandstone, with balusters in fire clay. The wall contains square piers and open balusters, and has saddleback coping.	II
Storch Bridge; 54.67238°N 2.86142°W		Late 18th to early 19th century	The bridge carries a road over the River Petteril. It is in sandstone, and consists of a single segmental arch with a hump back. The bridge has a solid chamfered parapet, on which is an inscribed cast iron plate.	II
Waterfoot Hotel; 54.61334°N 2.83717°W		c. 1808	Originally a house, later a hotel. The house was in two builds and it has two storeys and a green slate roof. The earlier part is stuccoed and has eight bays; the later part is in calciferous sandstone with five bays. On the front is a pilastered porch, and above the door is a fanlight. The windows in both parts are sashes.	II
Calley Bridge; 54.63062°N 2.87114°W	—	1820	The bridge carries a road over Dacre Beck. It is in stone and consists of a single segmental arch. The bridge has a hood band, a straight parapet with chamfered coping, and flanking raking abutments.	II
Blencow Bridge; 54.68665°N 2.84886°W		Early 19th century	The bridge carries a road over the River Petteril. It is in sandstone, and consists of two segmental arches with splayed cutwaters. The bridge has recessed voussoirs, a solid chamfered parapet, pedestrian refuges, and end square piers with shaped caps.	II
Boundary stone 54.64276°N 2.84817°W	—	Early 19th century	The boundary stone is in red sandstone and has a rounded top. It is inscribed with the names of the two townships.	II
Former Brewhouse, Dalemain; 54.63444°N 2.81170°W	—	Early 19th century	Later used as a private house, the brewhouse is in sandstone with a hipped green slate roof. It has one storey and two bays, with a single-bay extension to the left. The doorway and sash windows have stone surrounds, and in the extension is a segmental arch and a casement window.	II
High Bridge; 54.62704°N 2.84991°W	—	Early 19th century	The bridge carries a road over Dacre Beck. It is in sandstone and consists of a single segmental arch. The bridge is narrow, and has a solid parapet with flat coping.	II
Waterfoot Lodge; 54.61390°N 2.83084°W	—	Early 19th century	The lodge to Waterfoot House is rendered on a chamfered plinth, and has a hipped green slate roof. It has one storey and three bays, the central bay canted forward. The windows have pointed arches, and on the right side is a 20th-century porch.	II
Woodlands; 54.64140°N 2.80202°W	—	Early 19th century	A stuccoed house on a chamfered plinth, with quoins and a green slate roof. There are two storeys and three bays. The central doorway has a pilastered surround and a fanlight. The windows are sashes in stone surrounds, and at the rear is a round-headed stair window with imposts and a false keystone.	II
Redhills Limekilns; 54.64757°N 2.77987°W	—	Early to mid 19th century	A block of limekilns in limestone with two pairs of arched openings. Two of the lower openings are partly blocked.	II
Telephone kiosk 54.63128°N 2.83916°W	—	1935	A K6 type telephone kiosk, designed by Giles Gilbert Scott. Constructed in cast iron with a square plan and a dome, it has three unperforated crowns in the top panels.	II

== Notes and references ==
=== Sources ===
- Historic England, "Church of St Andrew, Dacre (1145531)", National Heritage List for England
- Historic England, "Carved bear north-west of Church of St Andrew, Dacre (1145532)", National Heritage List for England
- Historic England, "Carved bear south-west of Church of St Andrew, Dacre (1262197)", National Heritage List for England
- Historic England, "Carved bear south-east of Church of St Andrew, Dacre (1252582)", National Heritage List for England
- Historic England, "Carved bear north-east of Church of St Andrew, Dacre (1252583)", National Heritage List for England
- Historic England, "Dacre Castle, Dacre (1221000)", National Heritage List for England
- Historic England, "Dalemain, Dacre (1221057)", National Heritage List for England
- Historic England, "Townhead, Dacre (1145542)", National Heritage List for England
- Historic England, "Green Flat and barn adjoining, Dacre (1145510)", National Heritage List for England
- Historic England, "Rose Hill and former barn, Dacre (1145509)", National Heritage List for England
- Historic England, "Carthanet and barn adjoining, Dacre (1326699)", National Heritage List for England
- Historic England, "Brooklyn, Dacre (1252578)", National Heritage List for England
- Historic England, "Waterfoot Farmhouse and barn adjoining, Dacre (1145508)", National Heritage List for England
- Historic England, "Rose Bank, Dacre (1145535)", National Heritage List for England
- Historic England, "Stables north-west of Aldby Farmhouse, Dacre (1145538)", National Heritage List for England
- Historic England, "Alms table west of Church of St Andrew, Dacre (1220946)", National Heritage List for England
- Historic England, "No. 2 Wood View, Dacre (1221021)", National Heritage List for England
- Historic England, "Aldby, Dacre (1221050)", National Heritage List for England
- Historic England, "Spire House, Dacre (1290677)", National Heritage List for England
- Historic England, "Sunbeam House, Dacre (1221132)", National Heritage List for England
- Historic England, "Sycamore House and barn/stables adjoining, Dacre (1326702)", National Heritage List for England
- Historic England, "Todd Farmhouse, Dacre (1326700)", National Heritage List for England
- Historic England, "Ash View, Dacre (1145511)", National Heritage List for England
- Historic England, "Lodge Farmhouse and former barn adjoining, Dacre (1145536)", National Heritage List for England
- Historic England, "Sourlands Gate, Dacre (1145507)", National Heritage List for England
- Historic England, "Stables and barn north-east of Dalemain, Dacre (1319056)", National Heritage List for England
- Historic England, "School House, Dacre (1145534)", National Heritage List for England
- Historic England, "Andrew House, Dacre (1210176)", National Heritage List for England
- Historic England, "Ash Cottage, Dacre (1290621)", National Heritage List for England
- Historic England, "Dacre Bridge, Dacre (1145540)", National Heritage List for England
- Historic England, "Garden wall adjoining to rear of Dalemain, Dacre (1290668)", National Heritage List for England
- Historic England, "Horse and Farrier Inn and stables, Dacre (1221010)", National Heritage List for England
- Historic England, "Town Head Farmhouse and barn adjoining, Dacre (1145545)", National Heritage List for England
- Historic England, "Greystone House and barn adjoining, Dacre (1319060)", National Heritage List for England
- Historic England, "Walnut House, Dacre (1290591)", National Heritage List for England
- Historic England, "Barn adjoining rear of Walnut House, Dacre (1145513)", National Heritage List for England
- Historic England, "Church View, Dacre (1145533)", National Heritage List for England
- Historic England, "Hall Bank and barn adjoining, Dacre (1221221)", National Heritage List for England
- Historic England, "Bunkers Hill and barns/byres adjoining, Dacre (1290653)", National Heritage List for England
- Historic England, "Hall Bank and barn adjoining, Dacre (1221221)", National Heritage List for England
- Historic England, "Rose Farmhouse, Dacre (1290724)", National Heritage List for England
- Historic England, "Fort Putnam: farmhouse, barns, byres, cow house, wall and gateway, Dacre (1145543)", National Heritage List for England
- Historic England, "Greystoke Pillar, Dacre (1326697)", National Heritage List for England
- Historic England, "High Farmhouse, Dacre (1290672)", National Heritage List for England
- Historic England, "The Hill, Dacre (1319059)", National Heritage List for England
- Historic England, "Hopland House, Dacre (1326703)", National Heritage List for England
- Historic England, "Midtown, Dacre (1290589)", National Heritage List for England
- Historic England, "Barn and domestic range adjoining right of Stainton Hill, Dacre (1221214)", National Heritage List for England
- Historic England, "Summer House on top of Flusco Pike, Dacre (1221065)", National Heritage List for England
- Historic England, "Waltons Place and barns adjoining, Dacre (1221191)", National Heritage List for England
- Historic England, "Harness room east of High Farmhouse, Dacre (1319057)", National Heritage List for England
- Historic England, "Pigeon/poultry house west of High Farmhouse, Dacre (1221078)", National Heritage List for England
- Historic England, "Barn/stables adjoining left of Stainton Hill, Dacre (1145512)", National Heritage List for England
- Historic England, "Mount Pleasant Farmhouse and barn adjoining, Dacre (1290679)", National Heritage List for England
- Historic England, "Barn north of Mount Pleasant Farmhouse, Dacre (1319058)", National Heritage List for England
- Historic England, "Burbank House, Dacre (1145541)", National Heritage List for England
- Historic England, "Skirsgill, Dacre (1145505)", National Heritage List for England
- Historic England, "Terrace wall, gate posts and steps in front of Skirsgill, Dacre (1145506)", National Heritage List for England
- Historic England, "Storch Bridge, Dacre (1145544)", National Heritage List for England
- Historic England, "Waterfoot Hotel, Dacre (1290615)", National Heritage List for England
- Historic England, "Calley Bridge, Dacre (1112553)", National Heritage List for England
- Historic England, "Blencow Bridge, Dacre (1221119)", National Heritage List for England
- Historic England, "Boundary stone south-east of junction of A66 and Dacre Road, Dacre (1145537)", National Heritage List for England
- Historic England, "Former Brewhouse adjoining to rear of Dalemain, Dacre (1145539)", National Heritage List for England
- Historic England, "High Bridge, Dacre (1290694)", National Heritage List for England
- Historic England, "Waterfoot Lodge, Dacre (1326701)", National Heritage List for England
- Historic England, "Woodlands, Dacre (1145514)", National Heritage List for England
- Historic England, "Redhills Limekilns, 120 metres southeast of Slapestones roundabout, Dacre (1326738)", National Heritage List for England
- Historic England, "K6 Teleghone Kiosk, Dacre (1145435)", National Heritage List for England
- Historic England, Listed Buildings
- Hyde, Matthew; Pevsner, Nikolaus (2010) [1967], Cumbria, The Buildings of England, New Haven and London: Yale University Press, ISBN 978-0-300-12663-1
