= Natland =

Village in Cumbria, England

Coordinates: 54.296°N 2.737°W

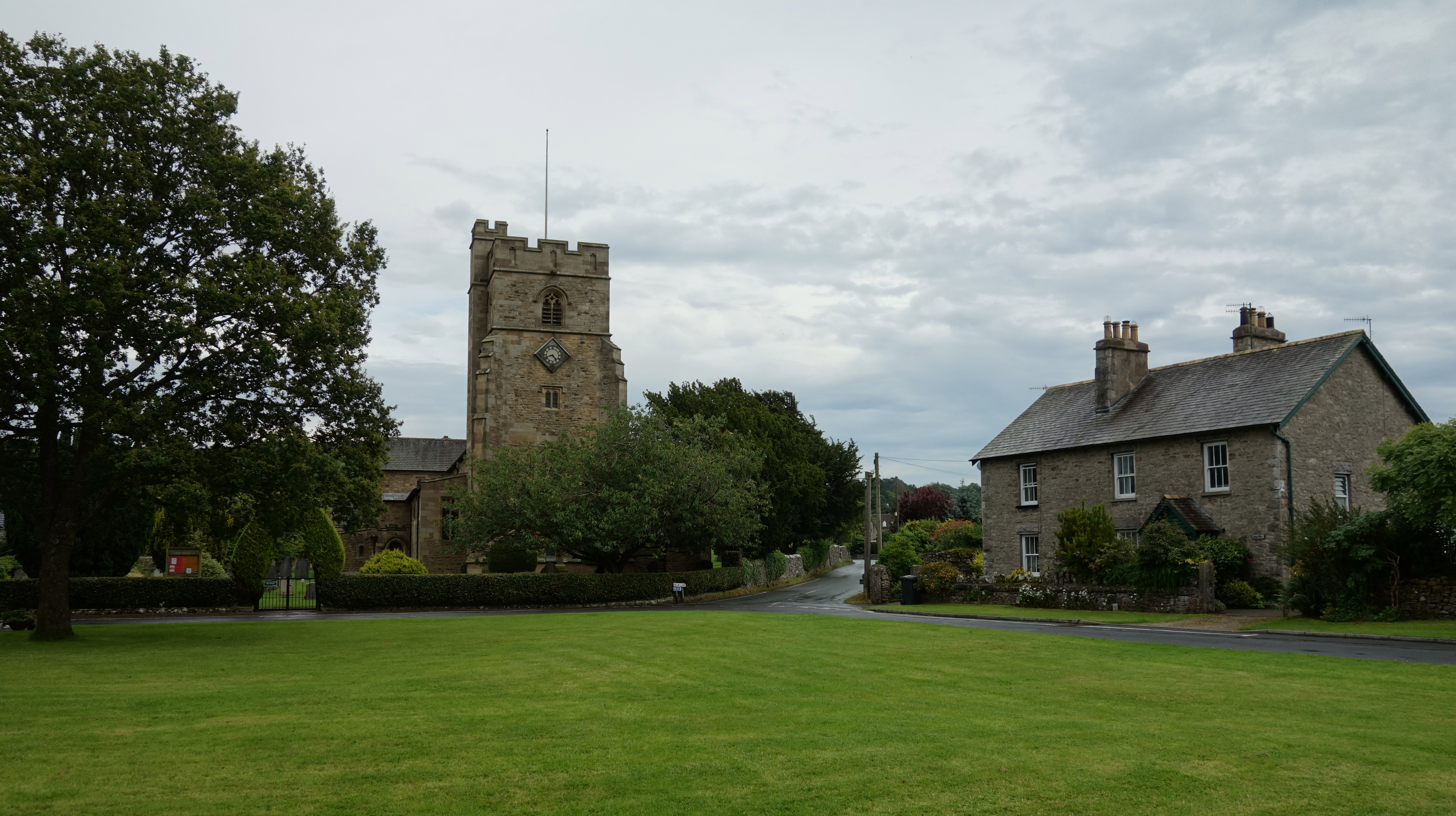
- The village green and St Mark's church

- Location in South Lakeland Location within Cumbria
- Population: 796 (2011 Census)
- OS grid reference: SD521892
- Civil parish: Natland
- Unitary authority: Westmorland and Furness
- Ceremonial county: Cumbria
- Region: North West
- Country: England
- Sovereign state: United Kingdom
- Post town: KENDAL
- Postcode district: LA9
- Dialling code: 01539
- Police: Cumbria
- Fire: Cumbria
- Ambulance: North West
- UK Parliament: Westmorland and Lonsdale

Natland is a village and civil parish about two miles (3 km) south of Kendal in the Westmorland and Furness district of Cumbria, England, close to the village of Oxenholme. In the 2001 census the parish had a population of 747, increasing at the 2011 census to 796.

== Features ==
The civil parish of Natland covers 892 acres (3.61 km^{2}) of open countryside on the east bank of the River Kent. It extends from the river to the sudden steep slope of Helm, which rises to 185 metres above sea level providing a fine viewpoint. Natland village stands at the centre of the parish.

Village landmarks include St Mark's Parish Church, built in 1910 (the third church on the site and an example of the work of the Lancaster architects Austin and Paley), St Mark's Church of England Primary School and the Village Hall. The village green, with its Coronation oak tree (1952), picnic table and two memorial seats, is a popular venue for locals and visitors alike.

The Village Green and Helm are both common land owned by the Strickland family, who live nearby at Sizergh Castle.

The Lancaster Canal ran through the west of the parish until its closure in 1947. Plans are now afoot to restore the canal and link it to the national waterways network. Natland is served by a regular bus service between Kendal and Silverdale and a mobile library.

There is a long-standing legend that Natland has a Treacle Mine. What is certain is that there is a cave system running under the village from Helm to the river although the precise route is not known. For more information see Natland Treacle Mines and Natland Treacle Tours. Yan, Hamilton and Woody of the rock band British Sea Power were raised in the village, as was their former manager Roy Wilkinson.

== History ==
Signs of the earliest occupation of the parish include earthworks on the summit of Helm, which could be an Iron Age fort. It is likely that the Romans used The Helm in conjunction with the Roman fort at Watercrook situated on the banks of the Kent, at the most northerly tip of the Parish. This 4-acre (16,000 m^{2}) site was occupied by the Romans from the 1st century to the 4th century AD and many Roman artefacts have been found.

Opinions differ as to the origin of the name Natland. The English Place Names Society gives the derivation of Natland as the Old Norse Natlundr, meaning 'Nati's wood', Nati being either a mythological name or a proper name and lundr meaning 'a small wood, a sacred grove'. However Nicolson and Burn's 1777 History and antiquities of the counties of Westmorland and Cumberland describes Natland as "a small manor or lordship, containing only about 30 families. It seems to have had its name from the Nativi or bondsmen probably placed there, as attendant upon the capital lord at Kendal Castle to do servile offices."

The earliest recorded use of the name is in 1164. Natland Hall farm was granted permission for a chapel in 1246 and is probably the oldest building in the village. Natland Abbey, an agricultural community and a sub-branch of Furness Abbey, is another 14th-century building. Watercrook Farm, Natland Mill and Cracalt Farm are also of early origin. In 1674, the Dissenter Richard Frankland founded the Natland Academy, which had tutored more than 350 students by 1693.

== Notable people ==
In order of birth:

- Richard Frankland (1630–1698) founded the Natland Academy for religious knowledge.
- Roy Wilkinson (living), music journalist and British Sea Power manager
- Yan, Hamilton and Wood of the indie-rock band British Sea Power, were brought up in Natland.

== See also ==
- Listed buildings in Natland
