= Slater's Bridge =

Packhorse bridge which crosses the River Brathay in Cumbria, England

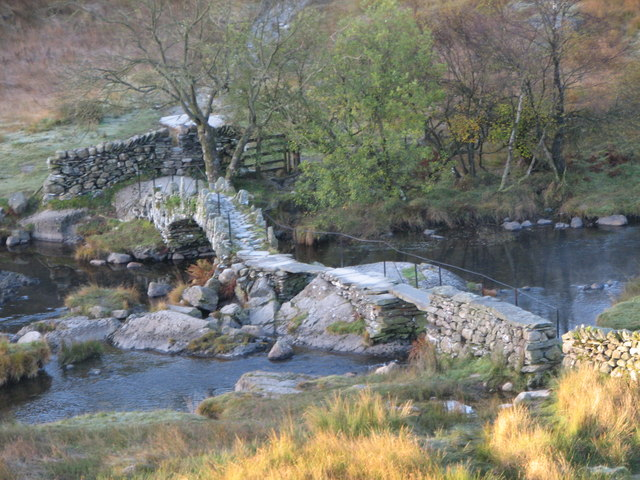
- Coordinates: 54.41783°N 3.06165°W
- Crosses: River Brathay
- Locale: Little Langdale, Cumbria

Statistics

Listed Building – Grade II*
- Official name: Slater's Bridge
- Designated: 12 January 1967
- Reference no.: 1245295

Slater's Bridge is a traditional packhorse bridge in Little Langdale in the English Lake District, standing at National Grid Reference NY3120502996.

== History and construction ==
The bridge dates back to the 17th century, and became a listed building in 1967. Built of slate, it consists of a 15-foot (4.6 m) segmental arch and a flatter span built of slabs, and incorporates a natural boulder in midstream. The bridge is thought to have been created by miners working in the nearby Tilberthwaite Fells.

Already in the 19th century, Alexander Craig Gibson called it "an exquisite and unique specimen of a style of bridge all but extinct"; a century later, Alfred Wainwright called it "the most picturesque footbridge in Lakeland, a slender arch constructed of slate from the quarries and built to give the quarrymen a shorter access from their homes".

== Literary associations ==
The bridge was acclaimed in a 20th-century poem as "...this/exercise in hanging circularity, toppling stress./The rough slate wedges carry their own likeness/on the belly of each, with the grass springing sidewise/at the joins. The bare arch links two valley sides/as though by a handclasp across the sky's reflection".

== See also ==
- Ashness Bridge
- Birks Bridge
- Listed buildings in Coniston, Cumbria
