= Cumbrian toponymy =

Study of place names in Cumbria, England

Cumbrian toponymy refers to the study of place names in Cumbria, a county in northwest England, and as a result of the spread of the ancient Cumbric language, further parts of northern England and the Southern Uplands of Scotland.

Cumbria within England

Cumbria is near the centrepoint of the British Isles. It has been inhabited since Upper Paleolithic, and various ethnic groups have left their linguistic marks since the Iron Age.

== Linguistic influences ==
=== Sources ===
Whaley provides a summary of the history of linguistic influences on, plus a dictionary of, the place-names of the area covered by the Lake District National Park, plus entries for Kendal, Cockermouth and Penrith, Cumbria. The five much earlier volumes of the English Place-Name Society cover the whole of the former counties of Cumberland, and Westmorland. Ekwall covers Lancashire, the northern part of which now lies within Cumbria.

=== Brythonic ===
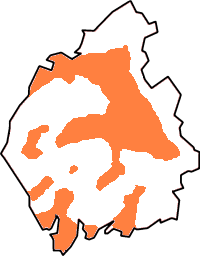
General distribution of Brittonic elements

Since at least the Iron Age, the inhabitants of Cumbria would have spoken Common Brittonic, which is the ancestor of modern Welsh, Cornish, and Breton. Evidence of this language is mostly visible in topographical features such as rivers (Kent, Eden, Ehen, Levens) and mountains (Blencathra, Helvellyn, Coniston Old Man).

In the first millennium AD the Brythonic spoken in north west England and southern Scotland developed into a separate strain called Cumbric. It is likely that most place names with Brythonic influences have survived from this time (Carlisle, Penrith, Penruddock)

British influenced place names exist throughout the whole county, but are particularly common around the river valleys of the Lake District and around the coastal plains of the Solway Firth.

Common Brythonic elements

- *blain (Welsh blaen) - 'summit' → blen-
- *cair (Welsh caer) - 'fort'
- *creic, *carrek (W. craig, carreg) - 'rock' → crag
- *din (W. din) - 'fort'
- *penn (W. pen) - 'hill', 'head'

=== Old English ===
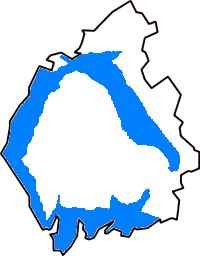
General distribution of Old English elements

Angles from Deira and Bernicia (later Northumbria) would have gradually filtered into Cumbria since the 5th century, but the area retained a distinctly British identity until at least the 8th century. Settlement by the English began in the north, with settlers following the line of Hadrian's Wall and traversing Stainmore Pass then settling the Eden Valley before making their way along the north coast. Some time later they would have begun to move into the Kent Valley, Cartmel and Furness, gradually moving further north along the west coast.

Surviving place names have been taken to show that the Anglo-Saxons stayed out of the mountainous central region and remained in the lowlands, but after the Celtic kingdom of Rheged was annexed to English Northumbria sometime before 730 AD, the Celtic language of Cumbric was slowly replaced by Old English . As a result, Old English elements can be found throughout the county, but mostly in the names of towns and villages (Workington, Millom). Very few rivers or mountains contain Old English elements (Eamont, Stainmore), but many of the lakes contain the element mere, meaning 'lake'.

Common Old English elements

- hām - 'homestead, village, manor, estate'
- -inga- - 'belonging to the sons or people of...'
- mere, mær(e) - 'pond, lake' → mere
- tūn - 'farmstead, enclosure, village'
- wīc - 'settlement, farm' (from Latin vicus, often found near Roman roads) → -wick, -wich

=== Old Norse ===
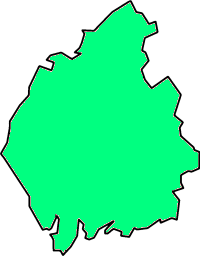
General distribution of Old Norse elements

The Norse appear to have arrived in Cumbria in about 925 AD and left a huge impression upon the toponymy of Cumbria. Originally from Norway, it is generally accepted that they would have come here via their colonies in Iceland, Ireland and the Isle of Man, perhaps bringing with them a touch of Gaelic influence. Placenames with thwaite, which are commonplace in Cumbria, are also abundant in the southern counties of Hordaland, Rogaland, Agder and Telemark in Norway proper, and less in use elsewhere (Norwegian: tveit, tvedt).

It seems they would have arrived around the south west of the county and penetrated into the uplands of the central region where the Old Norse influence is dominant. Many mountains, rivers and valleys have Norse names, as attested by the abundance of the elements fell, -ay and dale (Mickledore, Scafell, Rothay, Duddon, Langsleddale, Allerdale). Many town and villages also contain Norse elements (Keswick, Whitehaven, Ravenglass, Silloth, Ulverston, Ambleside)

Common Old Norse elements

- á - 'river'
- bekkr - 'stream' → beck
- dalr - 'valley' → dale
- fors - 'waterfall' → force/foss
- fjall - 'mountain' (usually a large, flat mountain) → fell
- gil - 'ravine' → gill, ghyll
- haugr - 'hill' → howe
- holmr - 'island' → holme
- intaka - 'intake'
- pic - 'peak' → pike
- sætr - 'shieling' → side, seat
- tjorn - 'small lake' → tarn
- þveit - 'clearing' → thwaite
- tún - 'farm'

There are also a number of Danish influenced place names (Allonby, Thursby, Ousby, Milnthorpe), but the majority are situated along the Eden Valley and the north coast of the county, suggesting that they might have come across Stainmore around the 9th century AD.

Common Danish elements

- by - 'home' (may be Old Norse, but more often Danish)
- þorp - 'secondary settlement' → thorpe

=== Goidelic Celtic and Irish influence ===
Some names show evidence of Irish or Norse-Gaelic influence (Kirksanton, Ireleth, Ireby). Several Gaelic Saints are recalled in Cumbrian place names, including St. Bega, St. Brigid, and St. Sanctan. The influence of the early Celtic Church in Northumbria and Cumbria was considerable.

=== Anglo-Norman and Middle English ===
At the time of the Norman conquest in 1066, it is likely that a mixture of Norse and Old English would have been spoken throughout most of Cumbria, which persisted until the spread of Middle English after the 12th century. The Domesday Book of 1086 lists only a few places in the south of the region, as at this time most of northern and central Cumbria was part of Scotland, but with several battles over the following centuries the whole area became part of England.

The influence of Anglo-Norman is usually confined to manorial names and residences and often include a personal name to distinguish between two places belonging to different lords (Egremont, Beaumont, Maulds Meaburn, Crosby Garret, Ponsonby, Grange).

Although it is often difficult to distinguish between a Middle English name and an earlier one, some places do seem to contain elements (Tod Ghyll, Brocklebank, Ladyholme, Cam Spout, Monk Coniston, Newlands, Sweden Bridge)

Common Anglo-Norman and Middle English elements

- grange - 'farm' (usually belonging to a monastery)
- great - 'large' (denoting the larger of two places)
- ground - (denoting land belonging to a person, divided from monastic lands after the Dissolution of the Monasteries in 1536)
- little - (denoting the smaller of two places)
- monk - (referring to land belonging to a monastery, usually Furness Abbey)
- mont - 'hill'

=== Modern names ===
Several places in Cumbria have been renamed in more recent times, (Belle Isle, Maryport(formerly Ellenfoot, Longtown, Sprinkling Tarn)

== Examples ==
=== Abbreviations used in the following descriptions ===
OE Old English ON Old Norse Da Danish Br Brythonic Celtic Go Goidelic Celtic Ir Irish Sc Scottish AN Anglo-Norman

=== Areas ===
- Allerdale 'valley of River Ellen'
- Copeland 'bargained land, bought land' from ON kaupa land
- Cumbria 'land of the Cymry' (the Brythonic name for the British people of the area, related to Welsh Cymru, from a Brittonic *kombrogi meaning 'fellow countrymen').
- Cumberland 'land of the Cymry' from the OE Cumbra land
- Furness 'further promontory' from OE fuðor and ON nes, the oldest form of the name is Fuþþernessa (c1150)
- Grizedale Forest 'valley with pigs' from ON gris dalr
- Morecambe Bay 'crooked sea' from Br *mori- & *kambo-. The name was recorded in Ptolemy's Geographica c.150AD as Morikambe, apparently referring to the Lune Estuary. It was subsequently lost then revived in the 19th century as both the name for the bay and the new Lancashire seaside resort at Poulton-le-Sands.
- Solway Firth 'Muddy ford estuary' from ON sol vath fjórðr - or from the Celtic tribal name Selgovae
- Westmorland 'land of the people living west of the moors' from OE west mōr inga land.

=== Rivers ===
- Bleng 'dark river' from ON blaengir, blá
- Brathay 'broad river' from ON breiðr á
- Calder 'rocky, fast flowing river' from Br *kaleto *dubro
- Caldew 'cold river' from OE cald ēa
- Cocker 'crooked river' from Br *kukrā
- Crake possibly 'stoney river' from Br *kraki 'stones'
- Dacre 'trickling stream' from Br *dakru 'tear'
- Derwent 'oaken valley' from Br *derwentio
- Duddon uncertain. Possibly 'Dudda's valley' from an OE personal name and denu or an unknown Br name containing *dubo, 'dark'.
- Eamont 'meeting of the rivers' from OE ēa (ge)mot
- Eden Uncertain. Mills suggests 'water' from a Celtic source, but gives no cognate.
- Eea simply means 'river' from ON á or OE ēa
- Ehen probably 'cold river' from a Br word related to Welsh iain, 'icy cold'
- Esk 'water' from Br *isca
- Gilpin named for the Gilpin family
- Greta 'rocky river' from ON grjót á
- Irt possibly 'fresh' from Br *ir
- Kent probably from Br *cunetio meaning 'sacred one'
- Leven 'smooth-flowing river' from a Br word related to Welsh llyfn, 'smooth'
- Liza 'shining river' from ON ljós á
- Lowther 'foaming river' from ON lauðr á
- Lune 'healthy, pure' from Br Alōna (cf Ialonus)
- Lyvennet 'abounding in elm trees' probably from a Br word related to Welsh llwyf, 'elm' (cf Derwent)
- Mite probably meaning 'drizzling' from Br meigh (to urinate, to drizzle), ON miga or OE migan
- Rawthey 'red river' from ON rauð á
- Rothay 'trout river' from ON rauði á
- Sprint 'gushing' from ON spretta
- Wampool possibly OE, signifying 'Wōden's pool'
- Waver 'restless' from OE wæfre (cf wave)
- Winster 'the left-hand river' from ON vinstri á

=== Lakes ===
- Bassenthwaite Lake 'Bastun's clearing' from an OE personal name Beabstan, or an NF nickname Bastun and ON þveit
- Brothers Water either 'broad water' from ON breiðr vatn or 'brothers' water' from ON bróðirs vatn (there are legends of two brothers drowning in this lake)
- Buttermere 'lake by dairy pastures' from OE butere mere
- Coniston Water named after the village, which means 'king's farmstead from ON konigs tun
- Crummock Water 'lake of the crooked river', linking the name with the River Cocker which flows through it. Related to Br *crumbaco
- Derwentwater named after the River Derwent
- Devoke Water 'little dark one' from a Br word *dubaco
- Elter Water 'swan lake' from ON eltr vatn
- Ennerdale Water named after the valley in which it is situated
- Grasmere 'lake in pasture' or 'grassy lake' from OE græs mere
- Haweswater 'Hafr's lake' or 'he-goat's lake' from the ON hafs vatn
- Hayeswater 'Eithr's lake' from an ON Eiths vatn
- Loweswater 'leafy lake' from ON lauf saer, ON vatn or OE wæter was added later
- Rydal Water named after the valley of Rydal; formerly called Routhmere, linking the lake with the River Rothay
- Tarn Hows probably 'hill tarn' from ON tjórn haugr
- Thirlmere 'lake with a gap' from OE thyrel mere
- Ullswater uncertain. Possibly named after a Norse chief Ulf or a local Saxon lord named Ulphus; or from the Norse god Ullr
- Wast Water 'Wasdale Water'. The name literally means 'water water' from ON vatn and OE wæter
- Windermere 'Vinandr's lake' from ON personal name 'Vinandr' and OE 'mere'

=== Mountains, fells and hills ===
- Birker Fell 'birch hill' from ON bjirk haugr
- Black Combe 'dark-crested mountain' from OE blæc camb, not to be confused with Br combe meaning 'valley'.
- Blencathra 'chair-shaped bare hill' or "Devil's Peak" from Cumbric *blein *cadeir or *blein *cuthrol
- Cat Bells 'den of the wild cat' from OE catt and ME belde
- Catstye Cam 'ridge with wild cat's path' from ON katts stigr kambr or OE catt stig camb
- Causey Pike cf causeway
- Coniston Old Man named after the town at its foot, the Old Man comes from Br maen meaning stone
- Dollywaggon Pike dollywaggons were sled-like barrows used to transport stone and minerals down the sides of steep mountains when mining was common in the Lake District. Pike means 'peak' from ON pík
- Harter Fell 'deer hill' from ON hjartar haugr
- Helvellyn Coates suggests a Cumbric *hal velyn - "Yellow Moorland"
- High Street named after the Roman road which passed along it, a literal translation of the Latin via alta; the summit of this hill is named
- Mellbreak Cumbric *moil brïχ or possibly Gaelic maol breac both meaning "speckled hill"
- Racecourse Hill after locals used the flat area for fairs in the 18th and 19th centuries
- St Sunday Crag Saint Sunday is the local name for Saint Dominic, though how he is connected to the mountain is unknown. Crag means 'rock' from the Br carreg
- Scafell Pike
- Skiddaw - Diana Whaley suggests "'the mountain with the jutting crag'". However, the first element may be a personal name or Old Norse skítr 'dung, filth, shit' Richard Coates suggests that "it is possible that a Cumbric solution is to be sought."
- Stainmore 'stoney moor' from OE stān mōr

=== Valleys ===
- Borrowdale 'valley with a fort' from ON borgar dalr
- Dunnerdale 'valley of the River Duddon'
- Ennerdale 'valley of the River Ehen'
- Langdale 'long valley' from ON lang dalr
- Lonsdale 'valley of the River Lune'
- Mardale 'valley with a lake' from ON marr dalr
- Patterdale 'Patrick's valley', possibly named after St Patrick or, more likely, a later Norse-Irish settler
- Sleddale 'valley with flat land' from ON sletta dalr
- Wasdale 'valley of water' from ON vatns dalr

=== Towns and villages ===
- Aspatria 'Patrick's Ash' from ON asc and the personal name
- Barrow-in-Furness 'headland island' from Br barr and ON ey
- Blennerhasset 'Hay farm on a hill' from the Cumbric *blein 'steep faced slope' plus ON haysaetr
- Bootle 'huts, shelter' from ON buðl
- Bowness 'promontory shaped like a bow' from ON bogi nes
- Cark 'rock' from Br carreg
- Carlisle 'fort of the God Lugus' from Br *Luguwalion -> Lat Luguvalium -> OE Luel -> Cumbric Cair Luel (Welsh - Caer Liwelydd)
- Cockermouth 'mouth of the River Cocker'
- Dalton-in-Furness 'farm in a valley' from ON dalr tun
- Frizington 'farm/settlement of the Friesen people' from OE Fris, inga and tun
- Grange-over-Sands 'outlying farm belonging to a monastery' from the ME grange. -over-Sands was probably added in the 19th century when the town prospered as a holiday resort overlooking Morecambe Bay. The term 'over-sands' may also refer to the ancient act of traversing Morecambe Bay sands as a means of shortening the travel distance in the area.
- Hawkshead uncertain. The 'hawks-' might either mean 'hawk' or be the ON personal name Haukr and the '-head' may mean 'head' from OE heofod or 'summer farm, shieling' from ON saetr
- Kendal 'valley of the River Kent' from ON Kent dalr
- Keswick 'cheese farm' from OE cēse wic[also ON "vik" 'landing place' (i.e. village)]
- Kirkby 'village with a church' from ON kirk by
- Maryport named after the wife of Humphrey Senhouse who developed the town into a port. It was originally called Ellenfoot as it stood at the foot of the River Ellen but was changed in 1756 as the town developed.
- Millom 'mills' from OE millen
- Milnthorpe 'village with mills' from OE millen and Da þorp
- Threlkeld 'thrall's well' from ON þrœl kelda
- Ulpha 'wolf hill' from ON ulfr haugr
- Ulverston 'Ulfr's farmstead' from ON Ulfrs tun (ulfr is also the ON word for 'wolf')
- Whitehaven 'white harbour' from ON hvit hafn
- Workington 'farm/settlement of Weorc's people' from OE Weorc, inga and tun

=== Islands ===
- Belle Isle, Windermere 'beautiful isle' from Fr belle

originally named Langholme, ON 'long island', it was renamed in 1781 by its new owner Isabella Curwen

- Chapel Island, Morecambe Bay named for the chapel built here in the 14th century by monks from nearby Conishead Priory to serve the needs of travellers and fishermen on the sands of Morecambe Bay.
- Foulney Island, Morecambe Bay 'island of birds' from ON fuglena and ON ey

Foulney is now a bird sanctuary and site of special scientific interest

- Ladyholme, Windermere 'island of Our Lady'. ME, using ON holmr

St Mary's hermitage was here, mentioned 1272

- Lord's Island, Derwentwater probably named after the Earls of Derwentwater.
- Piel Island, Morecambe Bay named after Piel Castle.

The island was originally called Foudrey or Fotheray, possibly from ON fouder ey meaning 'fodder island', and the castle was called the 'Pile [Peel] of Fotherey'.

- Rampsholme, Derwentwater probably 'Hrafn's island' from ON Hrafns holmr or 'wild garlic island' with the OE hramsa.
- Roa Island, Morecambe Bay 'Red Island' from ON rauðr

the area is rich in red haematite

- St. Herbert's Island, Derwentwater named after the 7th-century saint who was a hermit on this island.

the island became a place of pilgrimage by 1374

- Walney, Irish Sea 'Isle of the British' from ON valna ey

the Old English name for Walney was Wagneia, 'island of quicksands'. In the Domesday Book it is called Houganai or island of Hougun. Hougun, from the Old Norse word haugr meaning hill or mound, is also the name given to Furness in Domesday.

== See also ==
- Cumbria
- Lake District
- Cumbric language
- History of Cumbria
- Welsh placenames
- The Brittonic Language in the Old North
