= Dacre Beck =

River in Cumbria, England

Coordinates: 54.6325°N 2.8097°W

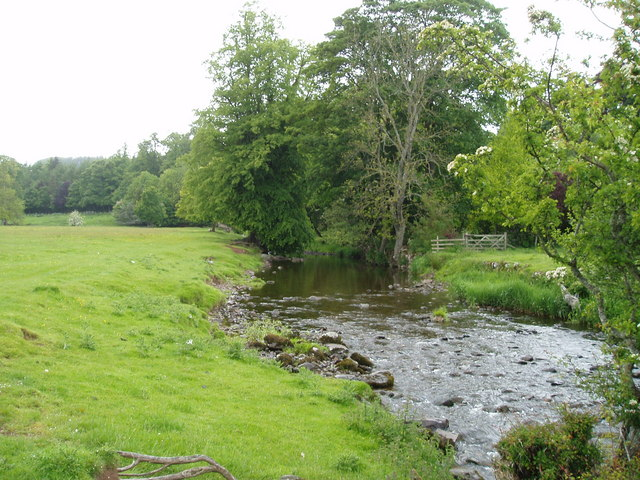
Dacre beck near Stainton.

Dacre Beck is a small river in Cumbria, England.

Dacre Beck rises on the north side of Gowbarrow Fell and flows north past Ulcat Row, picking up streams from Lowthwaite and Matterdale End, traversing a valley between Great Mell Fell and Little Mell Fell, before changing its course to eastward at Thackthwaite.

The beck collects more streams at Hutton, one of which comes south from Berrier past Beckces, near to Penruddock. From here, Dacre Beck flows past the ancient settlement of Dacre.

The beck is a tributary of the River Eamont, which it joins at Dalemain near Stainton.

Dacre Beck is a Celtic river name meaning the trickling one.
