= Blencow =

Village in Cumbria, England

Coordinates: 54.666°N 2.850°W

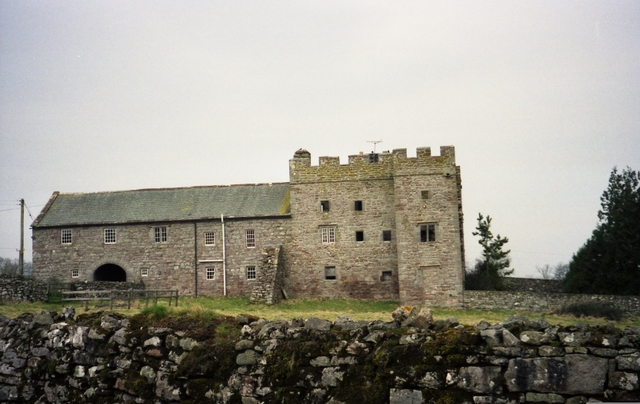
- Blencow Hall

- Location in Eden, Cumbria Location within Cumbria
- OS grid reference: NY451305
- Civil parish: Dacre; Greystoke
- Unitary authority: Westmorland and Furness
- Ceremonial county: Cumbria
- Region: North West
- Country: England
- Sovereign state: United Kingdom
- Post town: PENRITH
- Postcode district: CA11
- Dialling code: 01768
- Police: Cumbria
- Fire: Cumbria
- Ambulance: North West
- UK Parliament: Westmorland and Lonsdale

Blencow or Blencowe is a small village near Penrith, Cumbria, England. It is divided by the River Petteril into Great Blencow to the south and Little Blencow to the north. Great Blencow is in the civil parish of Dacre while Little Blencow is within Greystoke parish.

== History ==
The village shares its name with the Blencowe family. The "cow" part of the name is compared with the "gow" in Glasgow.

Adam de Blencowe was awarded land by Edward III in 1358 and the original family home was built in Great Blencow. Now little remains. Subsequently, in the 15th or 16th century the family built a new home, the current Blencowe Hall, just to the west of Little Blencow. It consists of two fortified pele towers joined by connecting buildings. It sustained substantial damage during the English Civil War, now evident externally as a deep gash on the front of the western tower. This was imaginatively restored in the late 20th century. The family continued to own the hall until 1802, when it was sold to the Duke of Norfolk. There is an active Blencowe Families Association who celebrate their connections with this village.

Blencow at one time had a very well known grammar school founded by Thomas Burbank in 1577. It was the first free grammar school in the north of England. Among its pupils were Lord Ellenborough, Lord Chief Justice and George Whitehead, a prominent Quaker. The original school was rebuilt in 1795 and continued to provide an education for boys (although no longer free) until 1911, when it closed. For a time it was used as a meeting place for the village, but was converted to a private residence, Burbank House, in 1917.

== Modern times ==
The post office and village pub were situated in Little Blencow, but both are now closed. Another pub called the Clickham Inn to the south of the village towards Newbiggin. Also at Newbiggin is the Hanson plc Blencowe Limestone Quarry and Blockworks, and the former Blencow railway station on the Cockermouth, Keswick and Penrith Railway.

The mansion of Ennim just south of the village was the home for many years of the Blencow family. From 1956, Conservative politician and cabinet minister William (Willie) later Viscount Whitelaw lived at Ennim until his death in 1999. During his residence, a substantial police presence was maintained at the house even after Whitelaw's retirement, owing to his time as Secretary of State for Northern Ireland.

== Notable residents ==
- Arthur Wannop FRSE (1900–1972) Director of Hill Farming Research Organisation and government advisor including on sheep farming in the Falkland Islands; born and raised at Little Blencow Farm.

== See also ==
- Listed buildings in Dacre, Cumbria
- Listed buildings in Greystoke, Cumbria
- List of English and Welsh endowed schools (19th century)
