= Newbiggin, Dacre =

Village in Cumbria, England

Coordinates: 54.653°N 2.821°W

Newbiggin
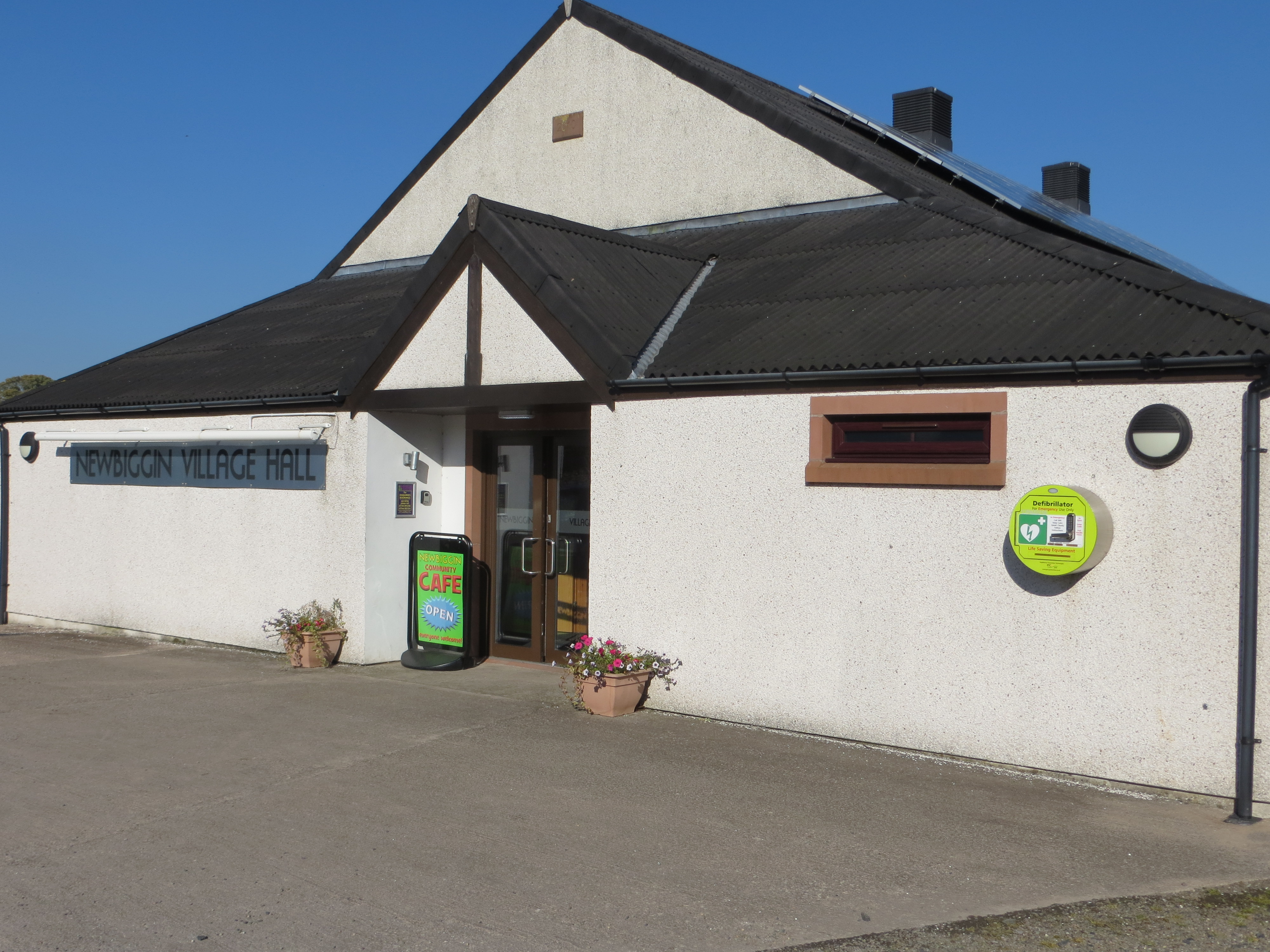
- Village Hall, Newbiggin

- Location in Eden, Cumbria Location within Cumbria
- OS grid reference: NY470289
- Civil parish: Dacre
- Unitary authority: Westmorland and Furness
- Ceremonial county: Cumbria
- Region: North West
- Country: England
- Sovereign state: United Kingdom
- Post town: PENRITH
- Postcode district: CA11
- Dialling code: 017684
- Police: Cumbria
- Fire: Cumbria
- Ambulance: North West
- UK Parliament: Westmorland and Lonsdale

Newbiggin is a small village in Cumbria, North West England. It is in the Dacre civil parish about 3 mi (4.8 km) west of Penrith. It lies at 750 ft (230 m) sheltered from the prevailing south-westerly wind by Flusco Pike, 150 ft (46 m) higher. It is described as a "non-nucleated village," lying for a mile along either side of the C3019 between the A66 and the B5288. There are at least six other villages in Cumbria with the same name, which is derived from the Old English ‘new biggin', or new house. Locally this village is referred to as the "Stainton Newbiggin," to distinguish it from the others.

== Geography ==
Geologically, the village is situated on a junction between carboniferous limestone and Penrith sandstone. The Putnam Fault passes to the west of the village. There is a line of springs and wells which runs through the village, and these sources of water may have been the motivation for the original human settlement of this site.

== History ==
=== Prehistory ===
There is evidence of human activity at Newbiggin since the very earliest times. Remains of Neolithic burials were found on Flusco Pike in 1875. Such finds are likely to date from 3000 BC or earlier. The 1775 enclosure maps of Newbiggin and Stainton identify several fields in Newbiggin as containing standing stones. Taylor recorded the remains of a line of standing stones running between Newton Reigny and Newbiggin. Several of the stones can still be seen in the fields or gardens in Newbiggin.

=== Roman era ===
The Romans' invasion of Britain in 55 BC, and the subsequent garrisoning of several thousand soldiers and their horses at the Roman Wall required enormous amounts of grain, meat, timber and animals. There is evidence that much of the land south of Carlisle provided these commodities with an extensive grid network or farms and access roads. Several quern-stones, used for grinding grain, have been discovered in Newbiggin, and identified as probably Roman in origin. This suggests some sort of minor Roman settlement in Newbiggin, perhaps a smallholding or farm. A Roman coin hoard has been found near Newbiggin with material dated from 400AD. Roman remains have also been found nearby at Stainton and Blencowe.

=== Viking era ===
Norwegian and Danish settlement in Cumbria took place from the 10th Century onwards. The layout of the village houses with crofts and garths leading off the common lands at Flusco suggests that the first organised settlement was Danish. Perhaps the most dramatic evidence of Viking activity in Newbiggin is the silver jewellery found at Flusco Pike. The first find was in 1785 Further discoveries took place in 1830 and 1989. The finds consisted of massive silver brooches, the largest of which was over 20 inches (51 cm) long. Some of the hoard are now on display in the British Museum. The brooches are so large and ostentatious it is likely that they were owned by a Viking of very high status. Were these objects just lost or deliberately buried? It has been suggested that the objects could have belonged to Ealdred, the Danish King of Northumbria who probably encamped nearby before being defeated in a battle with the army of King Æthelstan near Dacre in 927.

=== Middle Ages ===
The earliest mention of Newbiggin after the Norman Conquest is in the Carlisle Episcopal Records of 1133-1292 which details the tithes due from "Timparon and Newbiggin." The sum of 33 shillings (£1.75) suggests that the village was comparatively wealthy, since Stainton's tithes were set at less than half that amount (16s.) and Hutton-in-the-Forest only 1s. The mediaeval village of Newbiggin is considered to have been larger than the present village.

In the 14th century Newbiggin seems to have been part of the Blencowe estate. Subsequently the lands were owned by the Dacre family, the Countess of Arundel, and latterly the Howards of Greystoke. Now Dalemain is the estate most closely associated with Newbiggin, lying in the same parish of Dacre.

Newbiggin appears on the earliest maps of Cumberland such as Saxton's map of 1576. This is perhaps surprising, given its small size and population. However, it may be a reflection of the presence of Tymparon Hall in the village, the home of a wealthy and notable family.

=== Early modern era ===
Many of the older houses in Newbiggin date from the late 17th century when the relationship between England and Scotland became more settled and raiding and reiving ceased. Although mainly a farming community, it has been suggested that the village was on a drove route which was used in preference to a route through Penrith, which would have involved paying tolls. The area at the north end of the village is known as ‘Clickham,' a name associated elsewhere in the UK with drove routes. At this time the centre of the village would have been open pasture where water supplies were available for the cattle to drink. Old residents remember gates across the road at either end of the village. probably north at Tymparon and south at Haw Bank. Records exist of the Newbiggin blacksmith shoeing cattle when they were being driven between the Solway Marshes and Yorkshire.

Life in Newbiggin in the 18th century was documented by a Mr George Thompson in his book, "A Sentimental Tour from Newbiggin to London." Mr Thompson was a resident of Newbiggin and during his time in the village built the folly on Flusco Pike. In his book he describes a festival held in the village in 1784 to celebrate the renovation of the village wells. He describes a parade through "our long village," followed by a speech given by Mr Hassell of Dalemain.

However, the quiet rural life of farming and stockbreeding was transformed in the early 19th century by the start of large-scale quarrying of limestone and the arrival of the railway.

==== Newbiggin Jury ====
The Newbiggin Jury is a relic of the old manorial system. Usually of twelve men, it was responsible for upholding law and order, administering the Poor Law of the Barony of Greystoke; and maintaining the common lands remaining after the inclosure act of 1775. These included public quarries, lanes and byways, village greens, lime kilns, common land and watering places. They were responsible for the employment and paying the wages of a rabbit and mole catcher, a quarryman and a carter. They also raised money to build the school and the adjoining schoolteacher's house. The Newbiggin Jury Records exist as far back as 1799. Among the entries are a resolution to sack the mole catcher for failing in his duty, the appointment of his replacement, and an account of the annual dinner held at Greystoke Castle for Jurymen. The Newbiggin Jury (and the neighbouring Stainton Jury) were active until the early 1980s. A challenge that they were not a legal entity was successful, and their duties and responsibilities were passed to Dacre Parish Council. As a committee of the council they still hold an annual meeting at which tenancies of the Jury Land are auctioned.

== Economy ==
West of the modern village is Flusco Quarry. Large-scale quarrying on Flusco Pike began in 1922. Initially this provided stone for railway ballast and the construction industry. But the limestone had far greater value as a constituent of mortar, and for fertilizer, and over the next forty years a huge quarrying operation took place. Much of the output was transported from the site by the railway and the two operations between them provided employment for many local people. However, mineral extraction ceased in the 1960s. The quarry is now used as a landfill site and recycling centre, and the site of the lime works and the associated sidings are a commercial estate.

At the northern end of the village is the Hanson plc Blencowe Limestone Quarry and Blockworks. This was originally owned by the same company who opened the brick and cement works at Edenhall, east of Penrith.

== Transport ==
The former Cockermouth, Keswick and Penrith Railway runs through the north end of the village, where a station was situated. Opened in 1865, it was initially a single-track line, but the section between Redhills and Blencow railway station was widened to double track in 1901. The extension to the stonework required for the bridge abutments can still be seen on those close to Newbiggin.

It was originally planned to name the station after the village. However, the operating company also had a station at Newbiggin, Temple Sowerby, only a few miles away, and it was thought that the duplication of names would cause confusion with ticketing and operational matters. Accordingly, the station was named Blencow (without a final ‘e.') It was one of the first on the line to be illuminated by "modern" acetylene lights.

Sidings west of the station, towards Keswick, served Flusco Quarry and Harrison's Limeworks. In 1936 a siding was constructed to the Blencowe (sic) Lime Company's works. This ran across what is now Mandale's coal yard to the current Hanson's brick plant. Within the works there was an extensive narrow-gauge railway system with its own wagons and engines.

The station was used by local people to get to work along the line, particularly to Threlkeld Quarry, where villagers were employed. One resident recalls his mother taking eggs to sell at Penrith market on the train.

The cutting beyond the station, towards Keswick, was the site of a tragedy in 1940. St Andrew's cutting was subject to severe winter snow-drifting. Concrete fencing had been erected above the cutting, but with little effect. In 1940 it had been blocked for five days and was being dug out by railway staff and 80 soldiers. Wagons shunted into the cutting to collect the snow ran into the team of diggers without warning. Three men were killed and seven injured. Other serious incidents occurred near the station. The stretch of line eastwards towards Penrith was a steep descent. In 1901 a coke train derailed and slid down the embankment just east of road bridge at Newbiggin. There were also several runaways on this section, when rolling stock ended up at Penrith Station. Fortuitously, no serious injuries occurred with these incidents. The line closed to all traffic in 1972.

A regular bus service to the village ceased in 2016.

== Community ==
In years past the village hosted a shop, a post office, a public house, a garage and a village hall. The shop and post office closed over twenty years ago. The Joiners Arms, at the southern or Stainton end of the village was purchased by a developer, and closed in 2001. The garage and 4x4 showroom continues to thrive. The village hall newbigginvh.co.uk replaced the old hall in 2010 at a cost of £245,000.

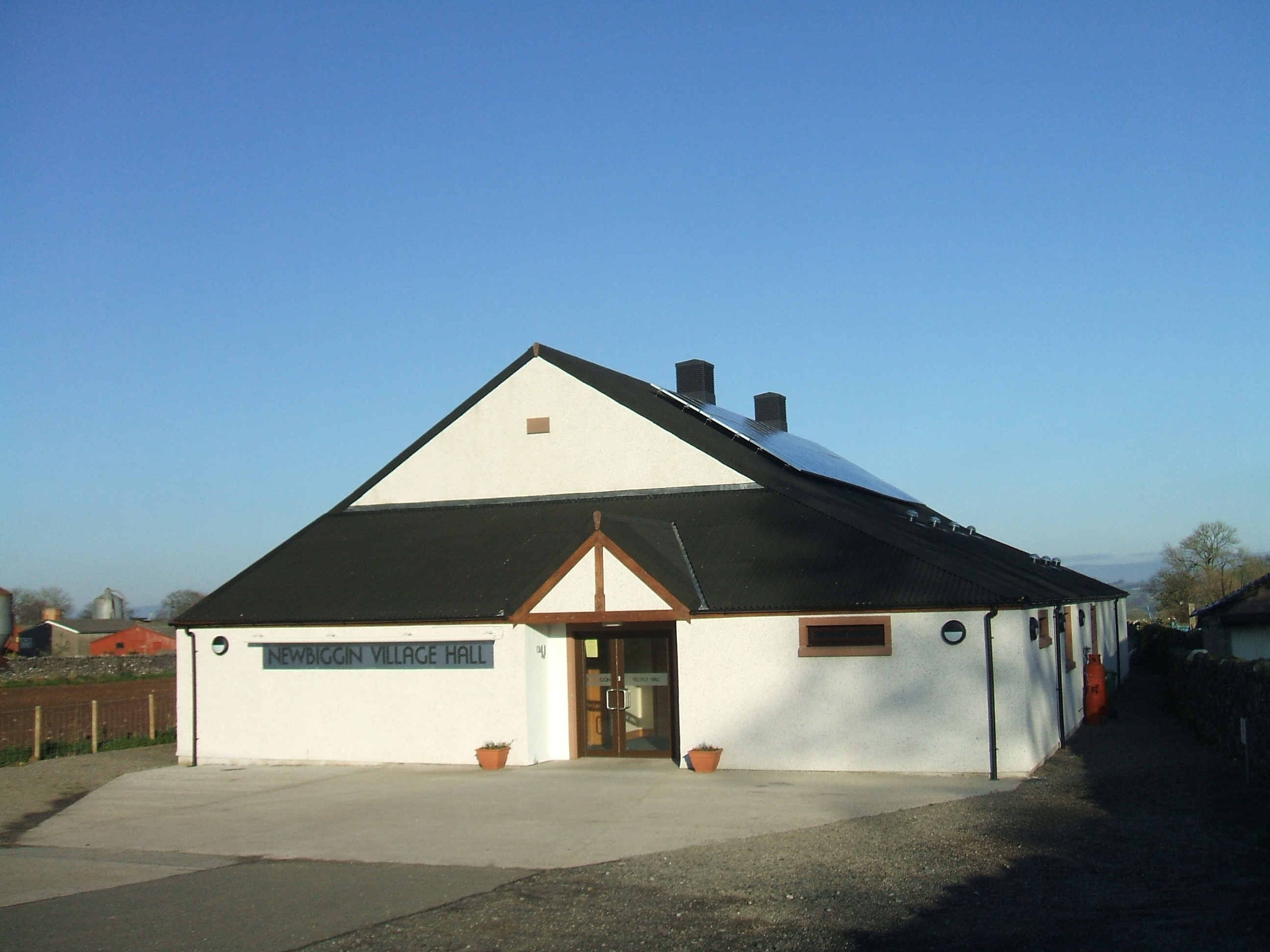
This hall was rebuilt in 2010, and replaced the old hall, originally built in 1956.

It is heated by a ground-source heat pump, and generates over 6.5MW annually from its photo-voltaic panels. It is highly valued by the community and provides a wide range of events and activities for both young and old.

== See also ==
- Listed buildings in Dacre, Cumbria
