= Soulby, Dacre =

Hamlet in Cumbria, England

Coordinates: 54.618°N 2.834°W

Soulby
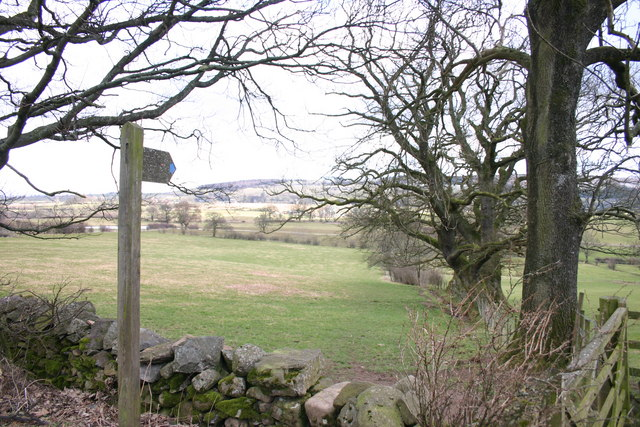
- Bridleway to the River Eamont from Soulby

- Location in Eden, Cumbria Location within Cumbria
- OS grid reference: NY461250
- Civil parish: Dacre
- Unitary authority: Westmorland and Furness
- Ceremonial county: Cumbria
- Region: North West
- Country: England
- Sovereign state: United Kingdom
- Post town: PENRITH
- Postcode district: CA11
- Dialling code: 017684
- Police: Cumbria
- Fire: Cumbria
- Ambulance: North West
- UK Parliament: Westmorland and Lonsdale

Soulby is a hamlet in the civil parish of Dacre, near the villages of Dacre and Pooley Bridge and the A592 road, in the Westmorland and Furness district, in the English county of Cumbria. In the Imperial Gazetteer of England and Wales of 1870-72 it had a population of 66. The name "Soulby" means "village near the fork or joining of two rivers".
