= Blencow railway station =

Former railway station in Cumbria, England

Coordinates: 54.666°N 2.833°W

Blencow
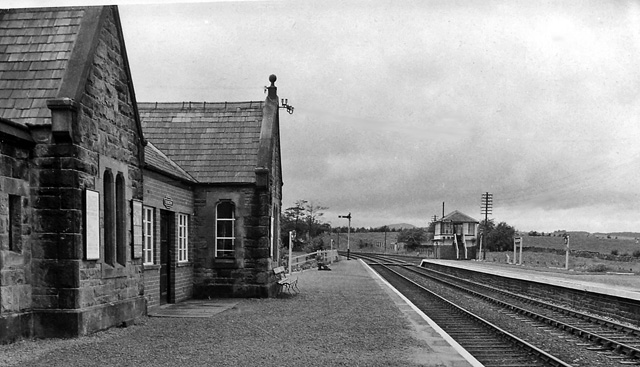
- The station in 1962

General information
- Location: Newbiggin, Westmorland and Furness; England
- Grid reference: NY463304
- Platforms: 2

Other information
- Status: Disused

History
- Original company: Cockermouth, Keswick and Penrith Railway
- Pre-grouping: Cockermouth, Keswick and Penrith Railway
- Post-grouping: London, Midland and Scottish Railway; London Midland Region of British Railways

Key dates
- 2 January 1865: Opened
- 3 March 1952: Closed
- 2 July 1956: Reopened
- 6 March 1972: Closed
Location
- Location within the former Eden District Location within Cumbria

Blencow railway station was situated on the Cockermouth, Keswick and Penrith Railway between Penrith and Cockermouth in Cumberland (now in Cumbria), England. The station served the villages of Blencow (or Blencowe) and Newbiggin. The station opened to passenger traffic on 2 January 1865, and closed on 3 March 1952. It reopened temporarily on 2 July 1956 before closing permanently on 6 March 1972.

Although called Blencow the station was actually situated on the edge of Newbiggin and was over 2 miles (3.2 km) from Blencow. Possible alternative names for the station before it was opened were Newbiggin station and Dacre & Greystoke station The station could not be named Newbiggin as there is another Newbiggin on the Carlisle – Settle Railway a few miles away.

Preceding station	Disused railways	Following station
Penruddock	Cockermouth, Keswick and Penrith Railway	Penrith
