= Ullswater (disambiguation) =

Ullswater is a lake in England.

Ullswater may also refer to:

== People ==
- James William Lowther, 1st Viscount Ullswater (1855–1949), British Conservative politician
- Nicholas Lowther, 2nd Viscount Ullswater (born 1942), British hereditary peer

== Other uses ==
- Ullswater, Ontario, Canada
- Ullswater Aerodrome, aerodrome in Canada
- Ullswater Community College, college in England
- Ullswater 'Steamers', boat company
- Ullswater Way, walking route in England
- Viscount Ullswater, title
