= Dacre, Cumbria =

Village and parish in the Lake District, England

Coordinates: 54.631°N 2.839°W

Dacre
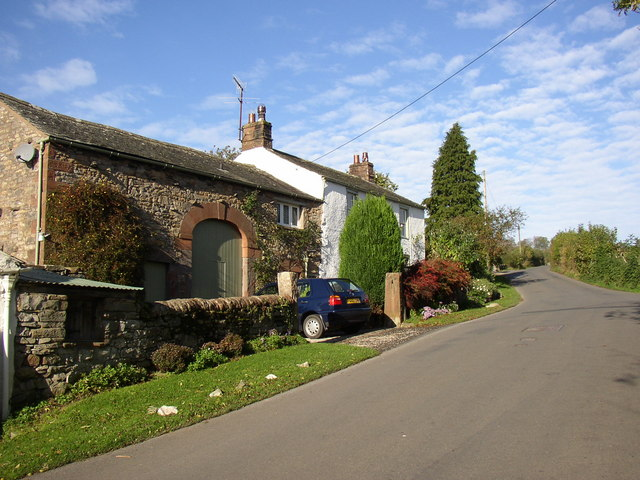
- Dacre

- Location in the former Eden district of Cumbria Location within Cumbria
- Population: 1,438 (2011) (parish)
- OS grid reference: NY4526
- Civil parish: Dacre
- Unitary authority: Westmorland and Furness
- Ceremonial county: Cumbria
- Region: North West
- Country: England
- Sovereign state: United Kingdom
- Post town: PENRITH
- Postcode district: CA11
- Dialling code: 01768
- Police: Cumbria
- Fire: Cumbria
- Ambulance: North West
- UK Parliament: Westmorland and Lonsdale

Dacre (English: /ˈdeɪkər/) is a small village, civil parish and electoral ward in the Lake District National Park in the Westmorland and Furness unitary authority area of Cumbria, England, but historically in the traditional county of Cumberland. In the 2001 census, the parish, which includes Newbiggin and Stainton, had a population of 1,326, increasing to 1,438 at the 2011 Census.

Dacre is situated about 5 miles (8 km) west of Penrith and contains St Andrew's Parish Church, an ancient castle, and the Horse & Farrier pub. Nearby is the small stately home of Dalemain. Dacre Beck is a major tributary of the River Eamont.

Although Dacre is a small place in itself, its civil parish is quite large and includes the villages and hamlets of Stainton, Redhills, Newbiggin, Great Blencow and Soulby. Stainton is by far the largest place in the parish and is a dormitory village of Penrith.

== Toponymy ==
'Dacre' is " 'the trickling one', from a Cumbric 'dagr' 'tear-drop'..." This refers to the stream, Dacre Beck, which gave its name to the village.

== History ==
As early as AD 731, the Venerable Bede, in his Ecclesiastical History of the English People, speaks of a monastery at Dacre, written as 'Dacore'. There is no later reference to the monastery, and it is assumed to have been destroyed by the Vikings. A church, however, has been present on the site for over a millennium. Archaeological excavations support the view that the church may be built on the site of the former monastery.

In William of Malmesbury's account of the Treaty of Eamont Bridge in 927 AD, he states that the meeting of the kings took place in Dacre ('ad locum qui Dacor uocatur'), but historians doubt the accuracy of his statement.

The Church of St Andrew is Norman in origin. Several notable archaeological remains are at the site. These include various stone bears, the celebrated Dacre Bears in the churchyard, and inside the church two fragments of Viking crosses. Above the tower doorway, there is a plaque stating that the church was partly rebuilt by William Pollock. The south door has a large lock dated 1671 inscribed 'AP', referring to the Countess of Pembroke, Lady Anne Clifford. The grave of Viscount Whitelaw, the former Home Secretary, is in the church grounds.

Dacre Castle is a quadrangular building with four turrets, a pele tower design, and built around the mid 14th-century. The castle was restored as a private dwelling in 1688. By 1816 it was being used as a farmhouse; it is now a private home. The castle is in an excellent state of restoration. It featured in 2007 in Robbie Coltrane's ITV series, Incredible Britain, where he travelled from Glasgow to London in a classic 1958 Jaguar XK 150 using only minor roads.

The Horse and Farrier public house is the 18th-century inn signposted from the A66 and A592. It is a pub and not an inn; the interior of the building has been described as 16th century. The pub has a letting flat.

In the Middle Ages the parish formed part of the Barony of Greystoke. The Rheged Discovery Centre is at Slapestones between Stainton and Redhills.

== Transport ==
The Cockermouth, Keswick and Penrith Railway had a railway station at Newbiggin but was called Blencow railway station to avoid confusion with Newbiggin railway station on the Settle to Carlisle Railway.

== See also ==
- Listed buildings in Dacre, Cumbria
