= Arthur Wannop =

Arthur Robson Wannop OBE FRSE (1900–1972) was a 20th-century British agriculturalist and authority on hill-farming. He was the first director of the Hill Farming Research Organisation and was a principle deviser of the Hill Farming Act 1946.

== Life ==
He was born on 1 August 1900 at Little Blencow Farm near Greystoke in Cumberland the fourth child of Thomas Wannop (d.1930), a farmer, and his wife Esther Ann Robson. Arthur was educated at Blencow Grammar School and the Queen Elizabeth Grammar School in Penrith. He then went to Liverpool University to study Engineering, graduating BEng in 1920. He then took a second degree in Agriculture at Aberdeen University graduating BSc in 1922. Arthur inherited a share in his father's holding at Langthwaite Farm at Warwick Bridge IN 1930.

He then worked as an agricultural advisor with the East of Scotland College of Agriculture from 1922 to 1932, serving variously in Fife and the Borders. In 1932 he moved as Agricultural Advisor with Northumberland County Council. In 1935 he became Director of County Work for the North of Scotland College of Agriculture in Aberdeen. In 1943 he joined a British Mission to the USA to exchange experience of farming issues with US farmers and in 1948 was appointed as Scientific Advisor to the Department of Agriculture for Scotland.

In 1952 he was elected a Fellow of the Royal Society of Edinburgh. His proposers were Sir Patrick Laird, Stephen Watson, Edward Wyllie Fenton, and Alick Buchanan-Smith, Baron Balerno.

In 1953 he became the first Director of the Hill Farming Research Organisation.

In 1957 Edwin Porter Arrowsmith asked the UK government to send a hill-farming advisor to the Falkland Islands. The government chose Wannop and this trip was eventually organised from October 1960 to January 1961. This resulted in the Wannop Report 1961.

He retired in 1965 and died in Edinburgh on 11 September 1972 aged 72.

== Family ==
He was married to Helann Wyse. They had three children including the urban and regional planner and author Professor Urlan Wannop, Ann and Ewen.
