= River Esk, Cumbria =

River Esk, Cumbria may be a reference to one of two rivers that flow through the English county of Cumbria:

- River Esk (Ravenglass), a river that rises in the Lake District National Park and flows into the Irish Sea at Ravenglass
- River Esk (Solway Firth), a river that rises in the Scottish region of Dumfries and Galloway before crossing into Cumbria and flowing into the Solway Firth
