= Redhills, Cumbria =

Hamlet in Cumbria, England

Coordinates: 54.649°N 2.770°W

Redhills
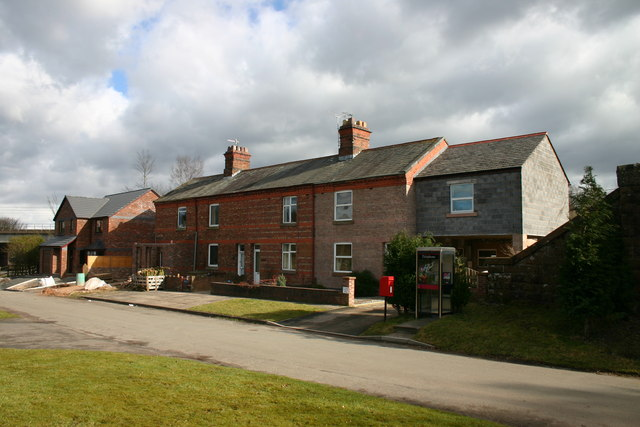
- Redhills

- Location in Eden, Cumbria Location within Cumbria
- OS grid reference: NY503204
- Civil parish: Dacre
- Unitary authority: Westmorland and Furness
- Ceremonial county: Cumbria
- Region: North West
- Country: England
- Sovereign state: United Kingdom
- Post town: PENRITH
- Postcode district: CA11
- Dialling code: 01768
- Police: Cumbria
- Fire: Cumbria
- Ambulance: North West
- UK Parliament: Westmorland and Lonsdale

Redhills (sometimes spelt Red Hills) is a hamlet in the civil parish of Dacre, in the Westmorland and Furness district, in the English county of Cumbria.

== Location ==
It is located on the A66 road just west of the market town of Penrith, near the River Eamont. Redhills has a Motel, council offices, a business park, and a nine-hole golf driving range. There is also nearby the Rheged Discovery Centre.
