= Great Mell Fell =

Fell in the Lake District, Cumbria, England

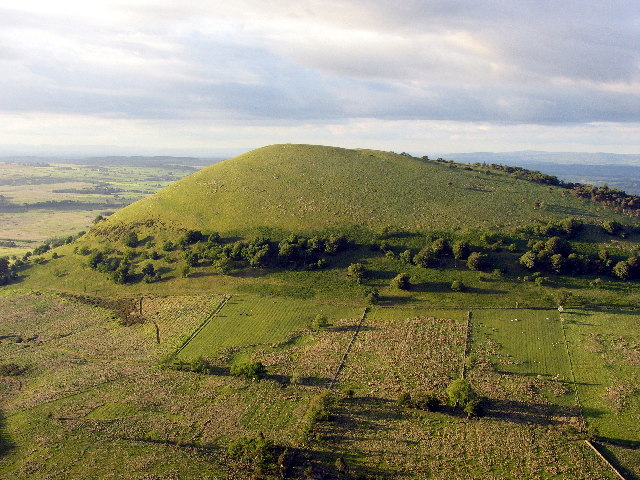
- Great Mell Fell seen from Gowbarrow Fell

Highest point
- Elevation: 537 m (1,762 ft)
- Prominence: 198 m (650 ft)
- Parent peak: Helvellyn
- Listing: Marilyn (hill), Wainwright
- Coordinates: 54°37′12″N 2°55′59″W

Naming
- English translation: Large bare hill
- Language of name: Brittonic (Cumbric), English
- Pronunciation: /ˌɡreɪt ˌmɛl ˈfɛl/

Geography
- Location within the Lake District Location within the former Eden District
- Location: Cumbria, England
- Parent range: Lake District, Eastern Fells
- OS grid: NY397254
- Topo map: OS Explorer OL5, Landranger 90

Great Mell Fell (Bare hill, with the later additions of both "Fell" and "Great") is an isolated hill or fell in the English Lake District, north of Ullswater and adjacent to the Eastern Fells. It rises from a level plain to a height of 537 m. Its top is a viewpoint for many of the surrounding higher fells. The fell is now owned and managed by the National Trust and offers a place of quiet refuge.

The fell was once well wooded, and retains a good covering of trees on the lower slopes, as well as scattered larches and pines higher up. Its rock is unusual for the Lake District, a reddish conglomerate of Devonian age, which has been eroded to form a rounded hill with smooth outlines and no rocky crags.

== Toponymy ==
The name of the hill is first attested in 1279, as Melfel. The first known example of the name with the addition Great, distinguishing it from Little Mell Fell, is Great mele Fell from 1487; it is also found under the name Westermellfell in 1589, since it lies to the west of Little Mell Fell; likewise Greenwood's map of 1823 distinguishes them as West and East Mell Fell. The first element of the name derives from the Common Brittonic word found in modern Welsh as moel ("bare"), and this must once have constituted the whole name of the hill. As English became the dominant language of the area, the English word fell ("hill") was added.

Fell is a local dialect word with several meanings, from either Old Norse fell, 'hill, mountain', or Old Norse fjall, 'mountainous country'. Fell is very common in Lake District place-names, some of which, like Mell Fell, are ancient, though many others are much more modern.

== Topography ==
Great Mell Fell is an isolated hill which rises abruptly from a wide expanse of marshy lowland to a height of 537 m. The fell has smooth, rounded outlines with no crags. Rock is represented only by a number of large erratic boulders, mainly on the north slopes, but also by the Cloven Stone near a barn to the south of the fell.

The hill is triangular in plan (indeed, it is almost the shape of a broad arrow-head) with the apex pointing west, down the steep "nose" of the fell, and with the gentler, broader eastern slopes divided by two shallow valleys which drain into the Wham Sike and Routing Gill Beck.

Great Mell Fell lies on the watershed between the Derwent river system to the west and the Eden system to the east. This watershed is formed by a low ridge, barely perceptible in places, which connects the Northern and Eastern Fells. From Bowscale Fell it runs across Eycott Hill to Great Mell Fell, then over Cockley Moor to High Brow and up the north-east ridge of Great Dodd, to join the main ridge on the Helvellyn range. Thus the eastern sides of the fell drain eventually into the River Eden via Dacre Beck and the River Eamont, while the western parts drain through Keswick via Trout Beck, the River Glenderamackin and the River Greta to the Derwent.

== Flora and fauna ==
Great Mell Fell is a quiet place of refuge within the surrounding agricultural land, for wildlife as well as for walkers. The sheltered lower eastern slopes are well covered by mixed woods of oak, rowan, birch, holly and Scots pine. Within the trees badgers and roe deer live, and green woodpeckers nest. It is said that the last wild cat in Cumberland was snared here in the nineteenth century.

Higher up the fell an old planting of Scots pine straddles the eastern ridge, and contorted wind-blown larches grow higher still, some blown almost horizontal. The trees give a glimpse of what other fells may have looked like in better-wooded times. A nineteenth-century guidebook claims that larch was planted all over the fell. However the fell’s name suggests that it was treeless in first millennium Celtic-speaking times.

Clumps of tough grass and occasional clumps of heather cover the highest parts, where occasional red grouse may nest.

== Summit ==
The summit is crowned by a low mound, marked as a tumulus on the Ordnance Survey 1:25,000 Explorer map. This is probably a small Bronze Age burial mound. A small cairn has been built on top of it, but was not there in the 1950s, when a dead tree trunk marked the spot.

The isolated position of the fell makes it a splendid viewpoint. Blencathra and the Dodds dominate the view towards the west, while to the south is an impressive vista of both the Far Eastern and the Eastern Fells, as far as Red Screes and the Kirkstone Pass. To the east, beyond Little Mell Fell there is a clear view across the Eden Valley to the north Pennines.

== Ascents ==
Great Mell Fell is now owned and managed by the National Trust. The whole fell is now open access land.

Access to the fell may be gained from near Brownrigg Farm on the minor road between Matterdale End and the A66 road, or from just south of Troutbeck on the A5091 road, along the disused rifle range. Paths just inside the boundary fence allow a circuit of the fell. The western end of the fell offers a very steep but grassy climb to the top. A gentler ascent follows a used path from the south-eastern corner and along the east ridge.

== History ==
There is a disused rifle range to the north-west of the fell. The target control building may still be seen. This was in use from the late 1890s, then by the War Department (now the Ministry of Defence) during the war years and into the 1950s. As a result, access to the whole fell was prohibited at the time by red danger signs. Alfred Wainwright includes a drawing of one of the signs in his 1955 guide book, but he himself apparently ignored the warnings and explored the fell anyway. Careful examination of the exposed soil in the butts will still reveal dead 303 rounds from the era

== Geology ==
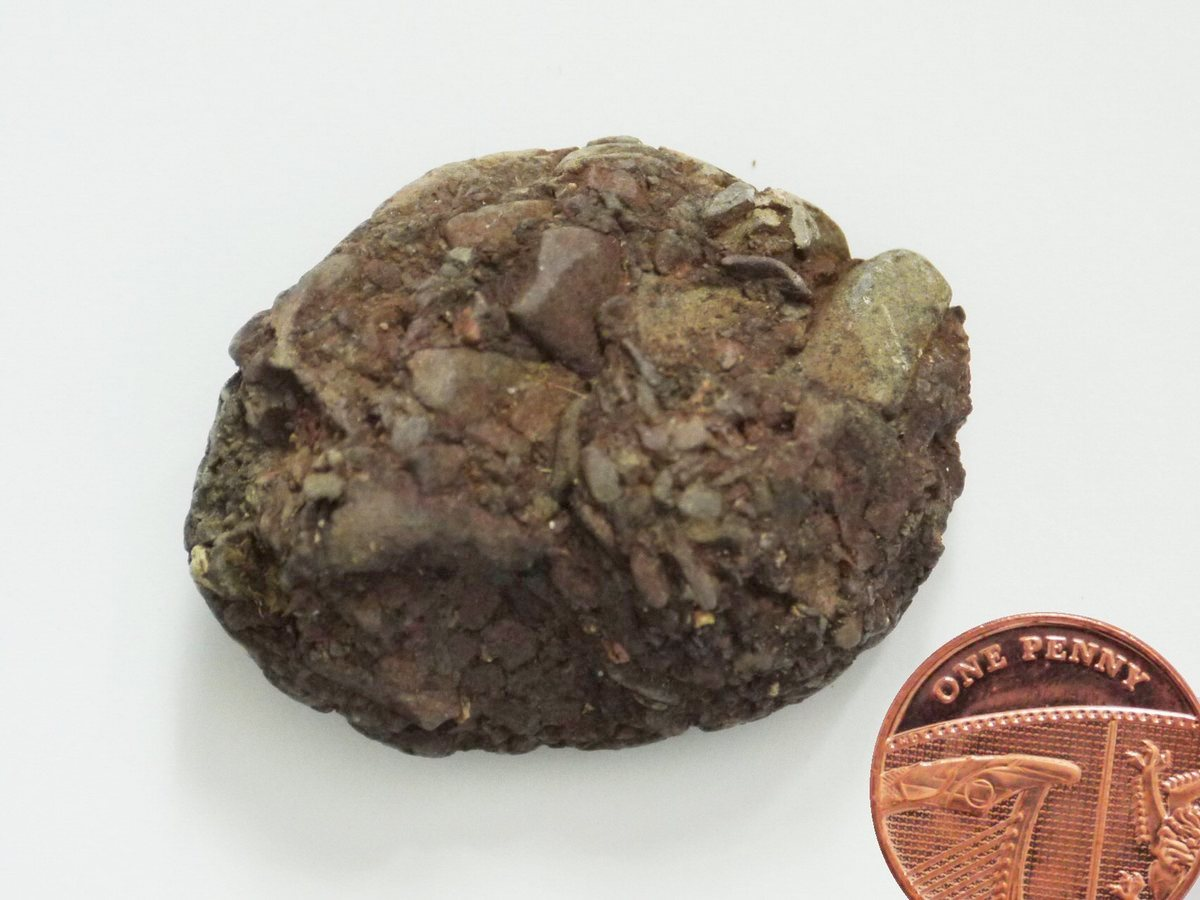
A pebble of Mell Fell Conglomerate, of late Devonian age, from the bed of the Wham Sike on Great Mell Fell

Both Great and Little Mell Fells are unique among the fells of the Lake District by being composed of the Mell Fell Conglomerate, a sedimentary rock formed from deposits of sand and gravel in alluvial fans and braided river channels in a desert environment. The rock contains no fossils. The stones in the conglomerate came from the erosion of both the Borrowdale Volcanic Group and the Windermere Supergroup. The reddish-coloured rock appears to date from the late Devonian Period, sometime around 375 million years ago. The erosion of this conglomerate has formed the smooth and rounded outlines that are distinctive of the two Mell Fells. While there are no crags on Great Mell Fell, boulders of the conglomerate may be seen in places, especially on the north slope, and it may also be seen in the two stream beds.

This Devonian conglomerate rests on the Birker Fell Andesite Formation, a thick sequence of andesite lava flows from the Ordovician Period, about 450 million years ago, and part of the Borrowdale Volcanic Group. This rock may be seen at the foot of the fell in the south-east corner, where a small quarry (at the beginning of the path along the south side of the fell) has extracted a little of this andesite.

Rocks of the Devonian Period are also referred to as the Old Red Sandstone. These should be distinguished from the younger New Red Sandstone of the Permian Period, found nearby in Penrith and the Eden Valley.

== Image gallery ==
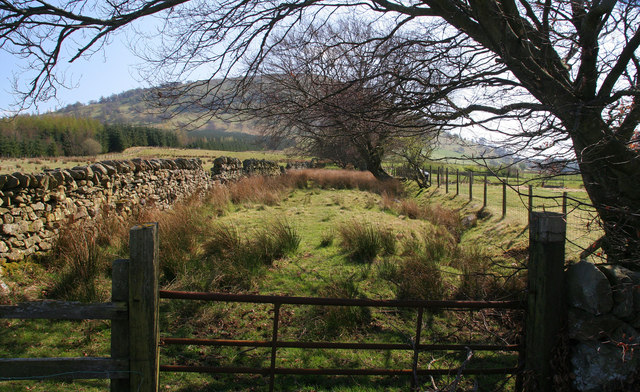
Great Mell Fell seen from the track alongside the old rifle-range to the north west

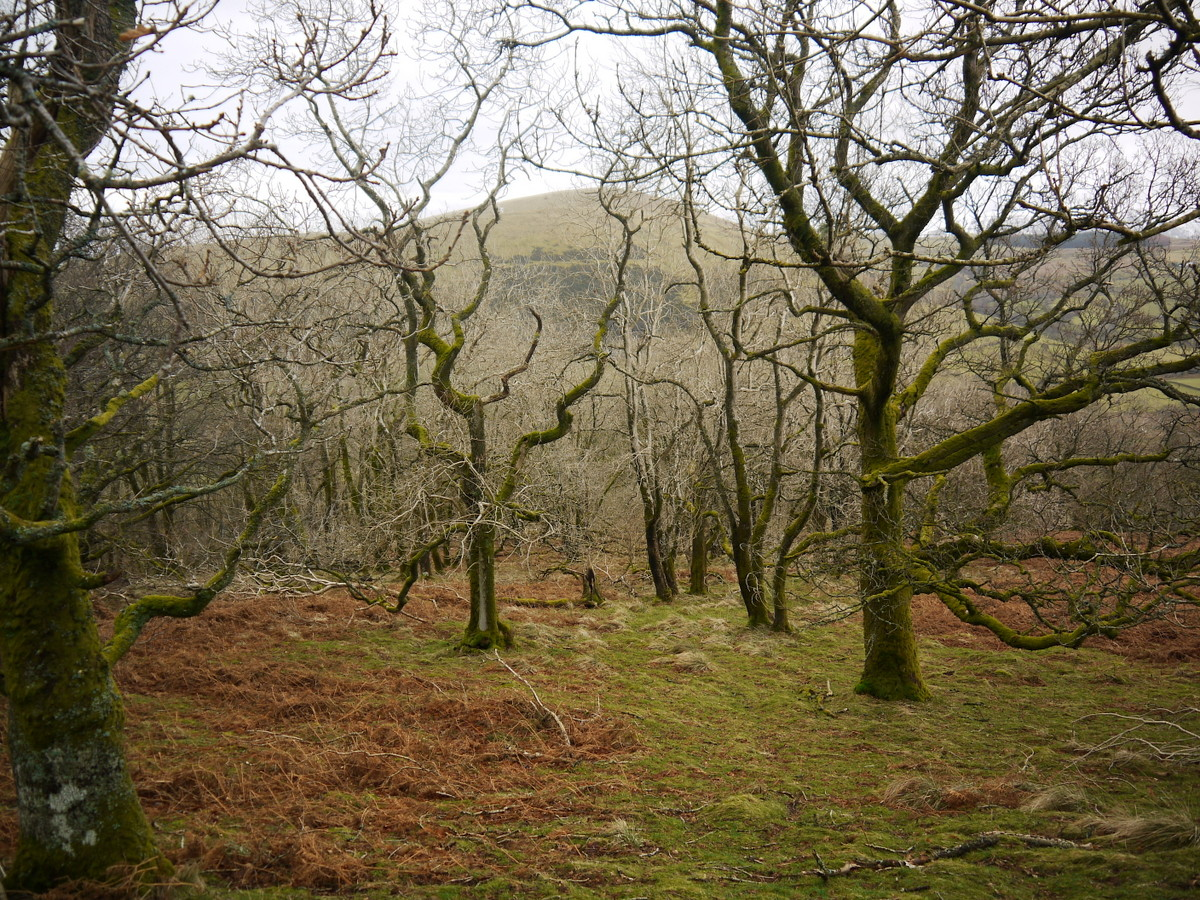
The wooded east slope of Great Mell Fell. Little Mell Fell is seen through the trees

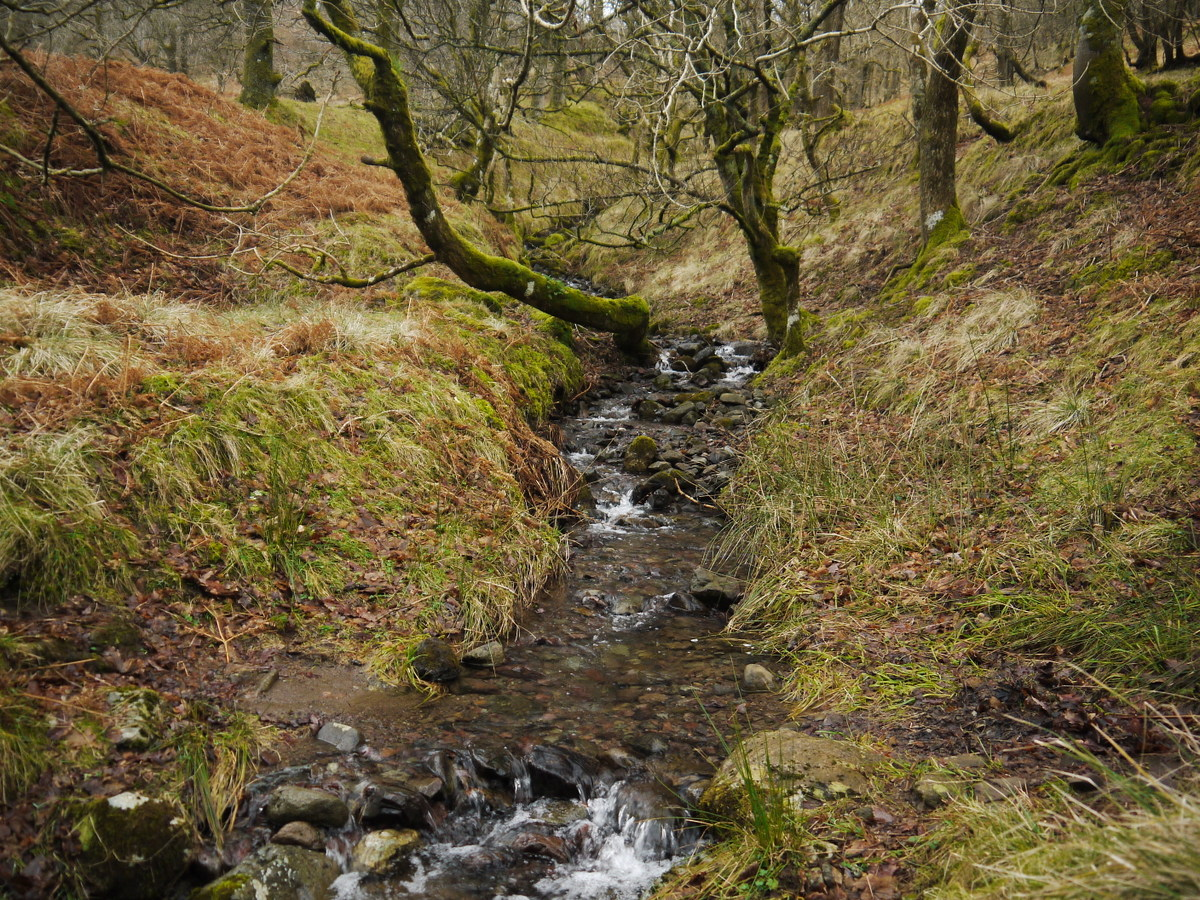
Routing Gill Beck on Great Mell Fell

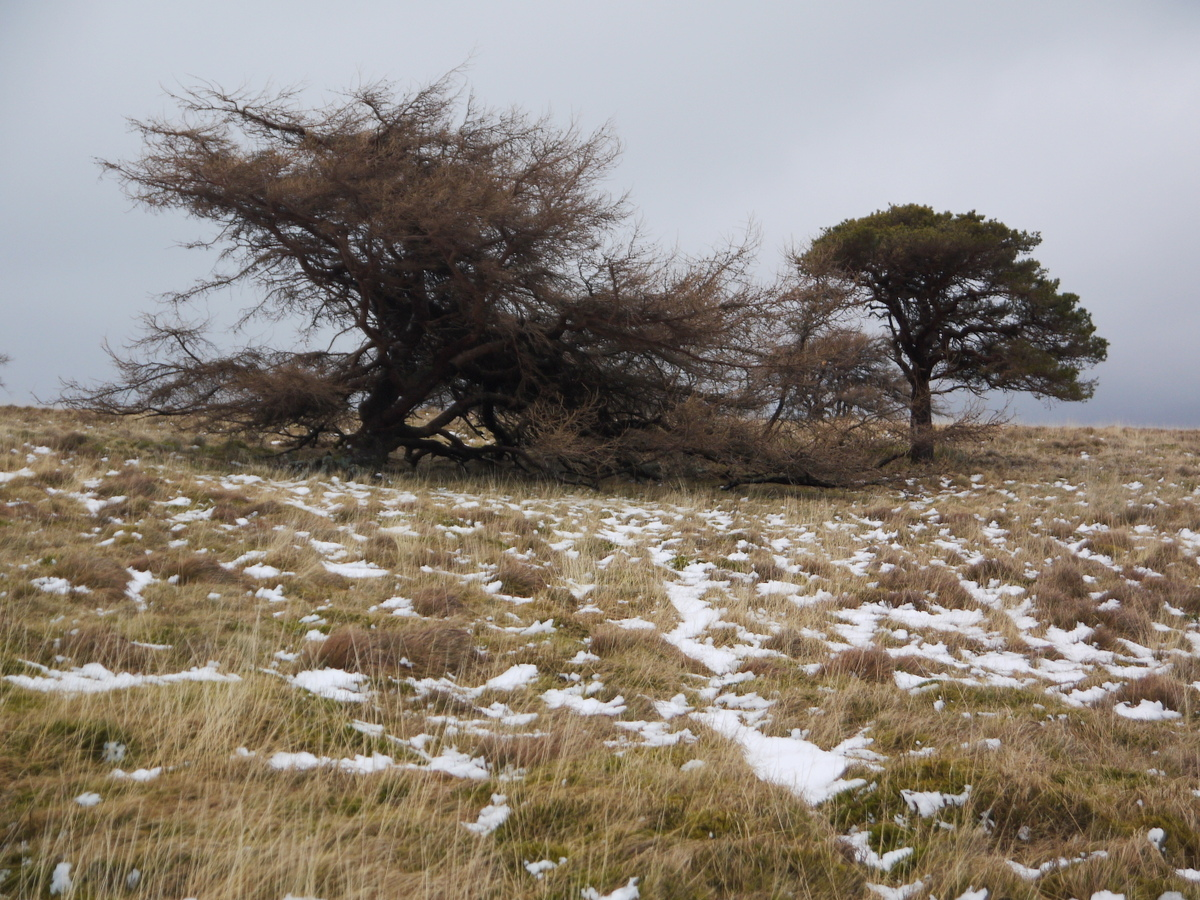
Larch and pine trees on the top of the east ridge of Great Mell Fell

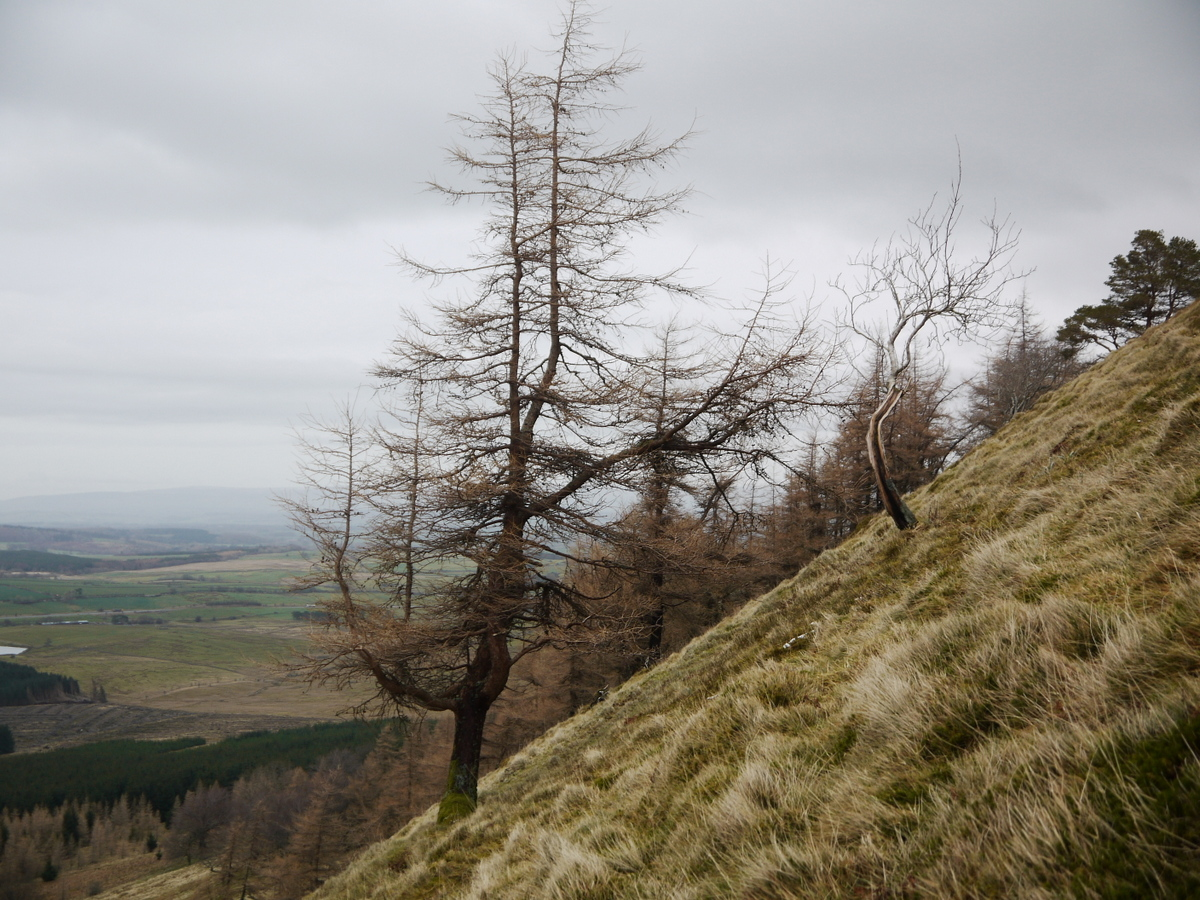
Larch tree on the steep west slope of Great Mell Fell

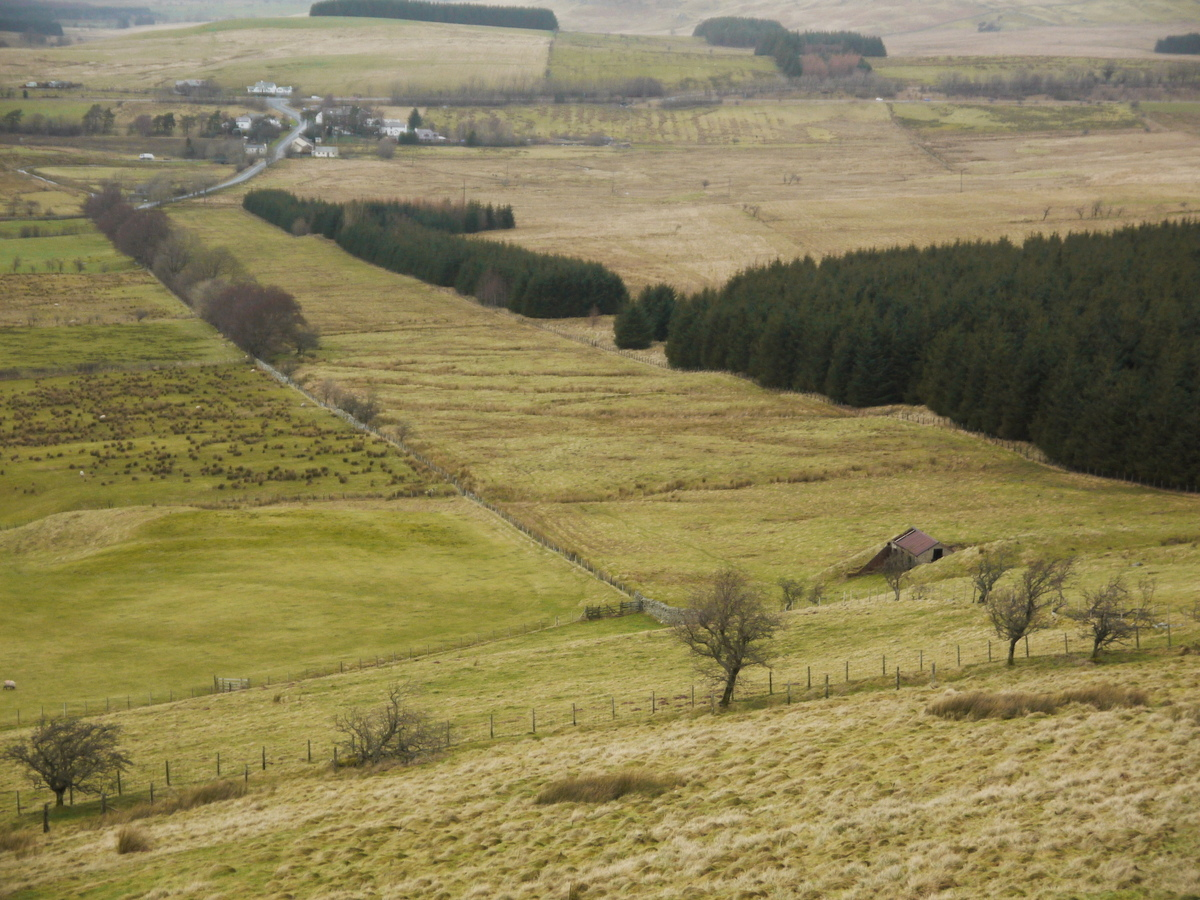
Disused rifle-range beneath Great Mell Fell

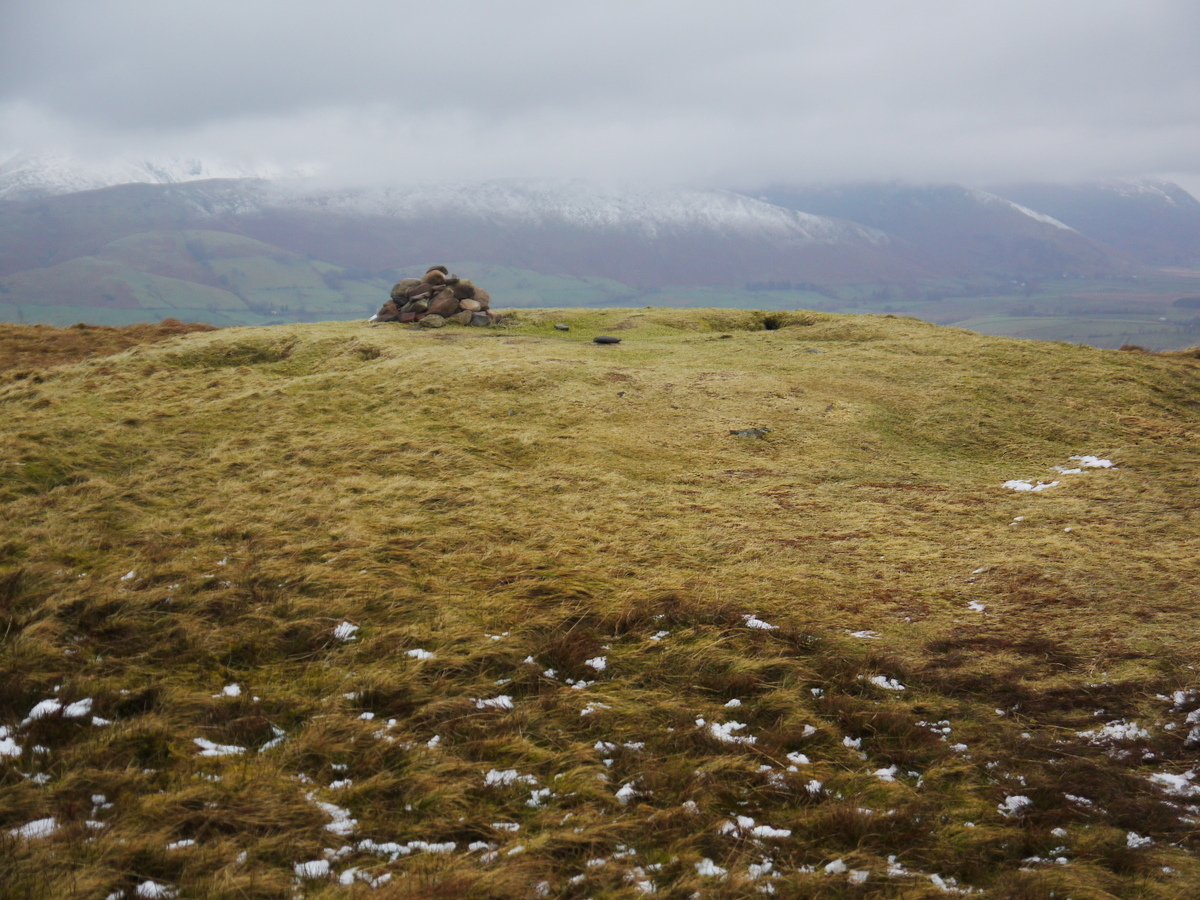
Summit cairn and remains of a Bronze Age tumulus on the summit of Great Mell Fell

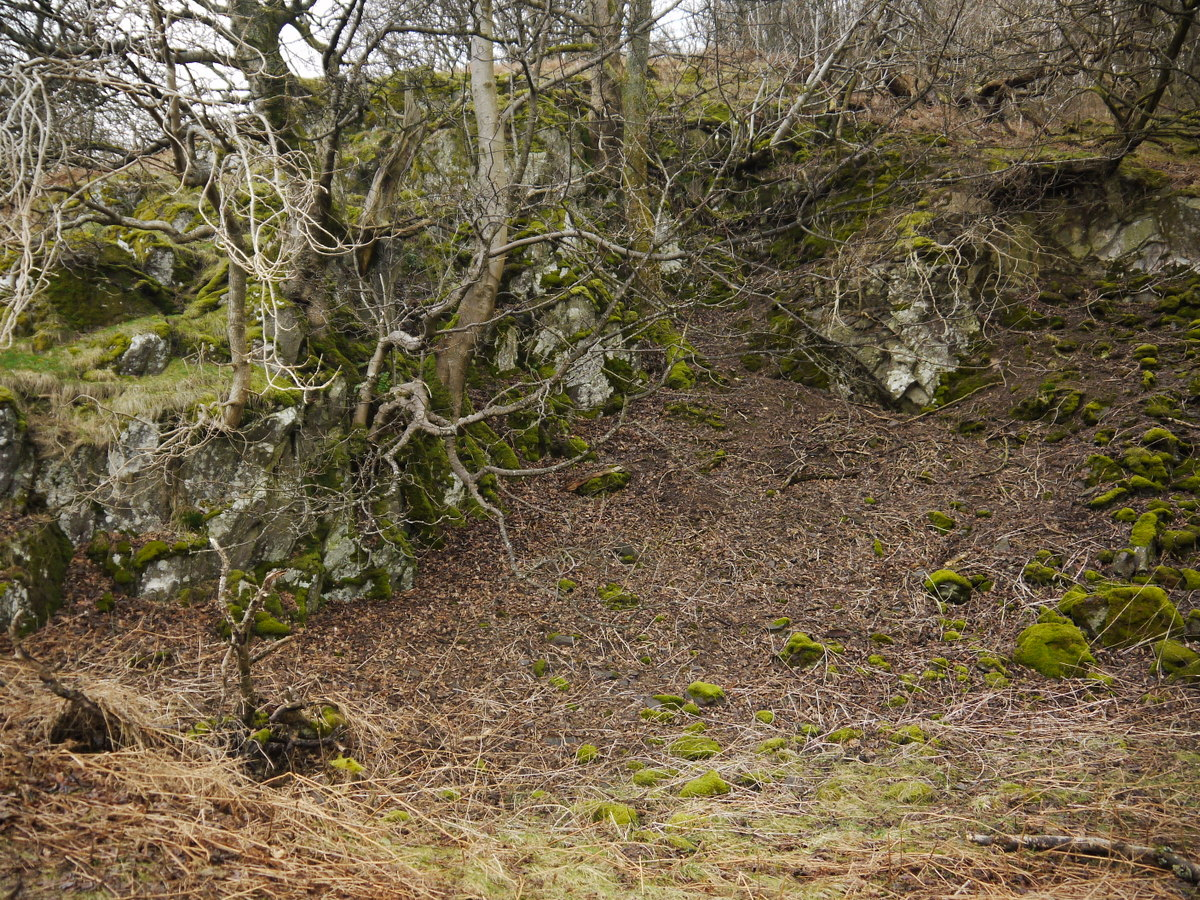
Small disused quarry in the andesite at the base of Great Mell Fell

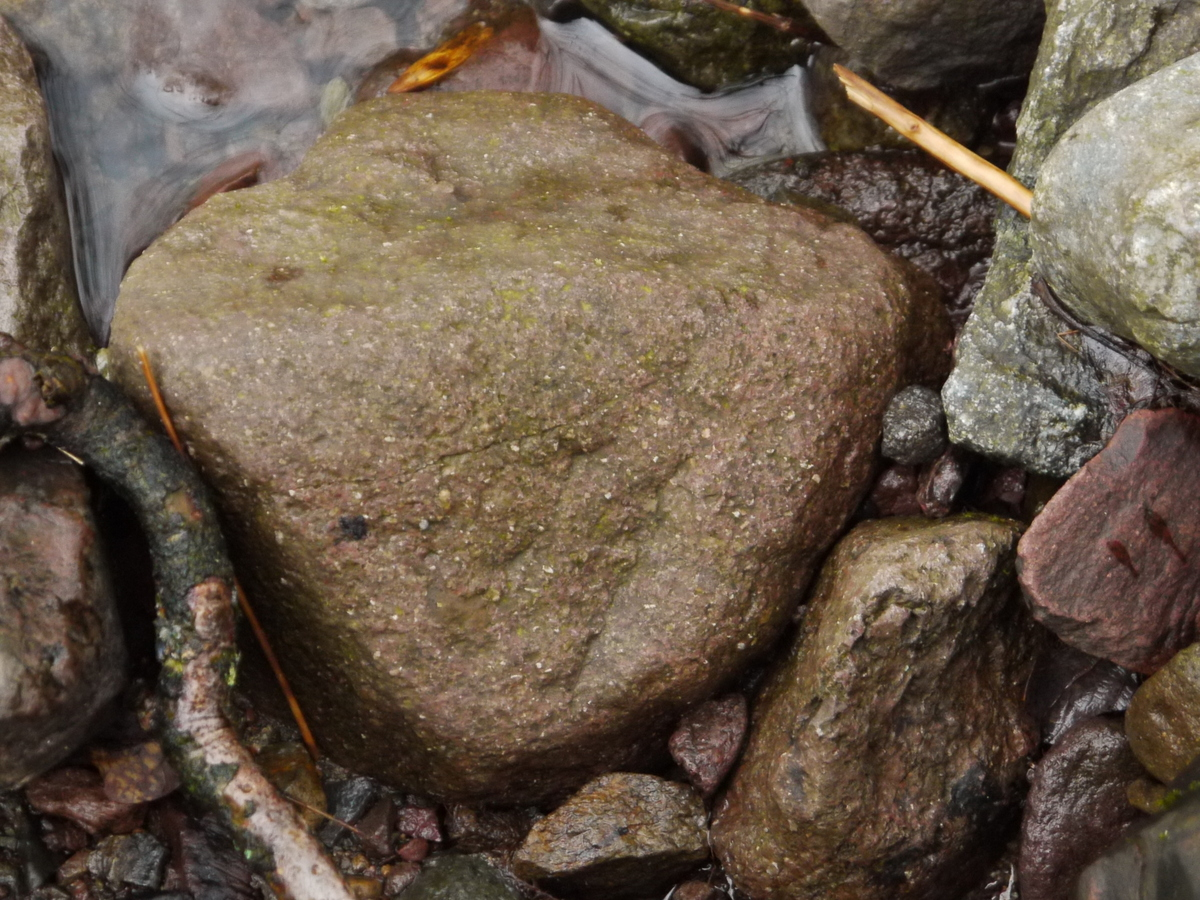
A boulder of Devonian conglomerate in the bed of Routing Gill Beck on Great Mell Fell
