= Little Mell Fell =

Mountain in Cumbria, England

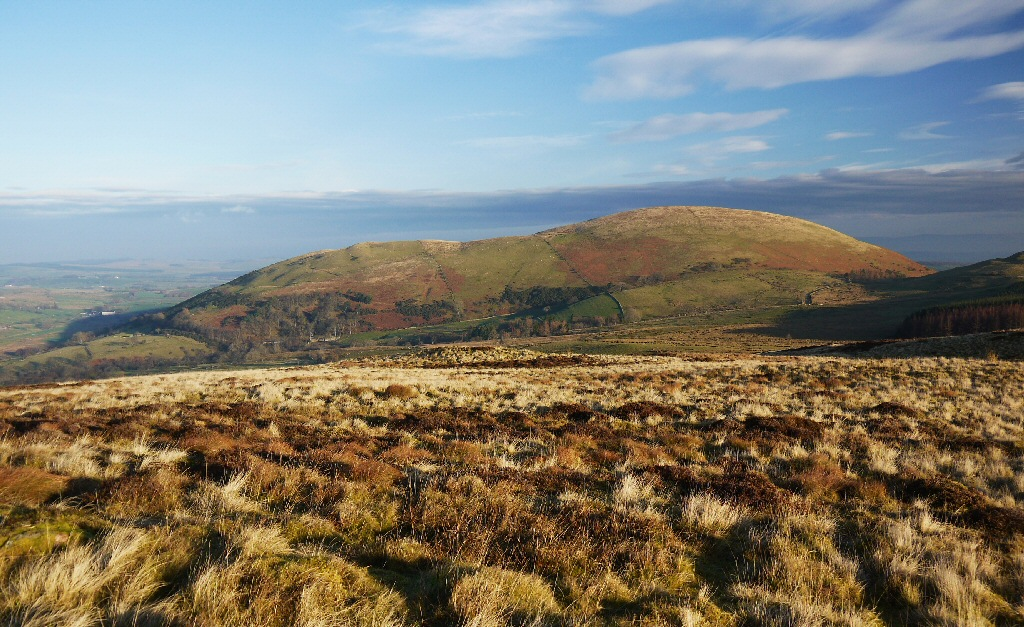
- Little Mell Fell, seen from Great Meldrum (to the south), showing the western ridge and the summit dome

Highest point
- Elevation: 505 m (1,657 ft)
- Prominence: 226 m (741 ft)
- Parent peak: Helvellyn
- Listing: Marilyn, Wainwright
- Coordinates: 54°36′28″N 2°53′41″W

Naming
- English translation: Small bare hill
- Language of name: Brittonic (Cumbric), English
- Pronunciation: /ˌlɪtəl ˌmɛl ˈfɛl/

Geography
- Location within the Lake District
- Location: Cumbria, England
- Parent range: Lake District, Eastern Fells
- OS grid: NY423240
- Topo map: OSExplorer OL5, Landranger 90

Little Mell Fell (Bare hill, with the later additions of both "Fell" and "Little") is a small fell in the English Lake District. It is an outlier of the Eastern Fells, standing to the north of Ullswater near the village of Watermillock, and connected to other high ground by a narrow col to the south.

It stands just to the east of the rather similar Great Mell Fell. Both fells are of a similar size and appearance. Both appear relatively isolated, both have a smooth, rounded outline, and unlike all other fells in the Lake District, both are composed of the same Devonian age conglomerate rock.

== Name and etymology ==
The name Mel Fell is first attested in 1279, as Melfel; the name is attested again in 1487 as Mele Fell, alongside the name Great mele Fell, distinguishing its higher neighbour. The name Little Mellfell is first attested in 1789, while Greenwood's map of 1823 distinguishes them as West and East Mell Fell. The first element of the name derives from the Common Brittonic word found in modern Welsh as moel ("bare"), and this must once have constituted the whole name of the hill. As English became the dominant language of the area, the English word fell ("hill") was added.

Fell is a local dialect word with several meanings, from either Old Norse fell, 'hill, mountain', or Old Norse fjall, 'mountainous country'. Fell is very common in Lake District place-names, some of which, like Mell Fell, are ancient, though many others are much more modern.

The Hause is derived from Old Norse hals, 'neck', often used to denote a pass between two valleys.

== Topography ==
Little Mell Fell is a small U-shaped area of high ground, about 1 square mile (2.6 km^{2}) in area, north of Ullswater and east of Great Mell Fell. Its summit is a symmetrical rounded grassy dome in the south-east corner of the fell which reaches a height of 505 m, 32 m lower than Great Mell Fell. Two short grassy spurs extend from this dome: one to the north and one to the west. The western spur then turns northwards so that a deep valley is enclosed between the two spurs, drained by the upper reaches of Thackthwaite Gill.

The fell has one visible connection to other fells. Due south from the summit a narrow col called The Hause connects it to Watermillock Fell and a ridge of high ground running south west, parallel to the shore of Ullswater, until it culminates at Gowbarrow Fell. Intermediate tops along this ridge include Watermillock Fell (424 m, unnamed on Ordnance Survey maps), Little Meldrum (404 m) and Great Meldrum (437 m).

The south-east corner of the fell is drained by a small beck which flows directly into Ullswater. All other parts of the fell are drained by various tributaries of Dacre Beck, which joins the River Eamont some 3 km below its outfall from Ullswater. Thus the whole fell drains ultimately into the Eamont and to the Solway Firth.

The fell has a few small areas of broadleaved plantation, but otherwise is bare, the lower slopes being parcelled up into fields for agriculture.

Notices indicate the presence of adders on the fell.

== Summit ==
The summit is at the top of a rounded, grassy dome and is marked by an Ordnance Survey triangulation column.

There is a good all-round view, though it is robbed of foreground by the gentle curvature of the grassy summit. The view extends east over the Eden Valley to the Pennine Hills, north to the Southern Uplands of Scotland, west and south to the fells of the Lake District, including the Northern, Eastern and Far Eastern Fells. Nearer at hand may be seen the lower reach of Ullswater, and it is a good viewpoint for Martindale.

== Ascents ==
Only the southern parts of the fell are Open Access land. Access to it may be gained from four points. From the east access is possible from a narrow lane alongside the fell near the Cove camping park. From the south access can be gained from The Hause, which is crossed by a minor road, and where some parking is available. From Lowthwaite Farm a public right of way runs along the south side of the fell, to The Hause. From the west a tractor track gives access to the fell from a point 400 m north of Lowthwaite Farm.

Three used paths approach the summit: from the west ridge, from the south directly from The Hause, and from the east.

== Geology ==
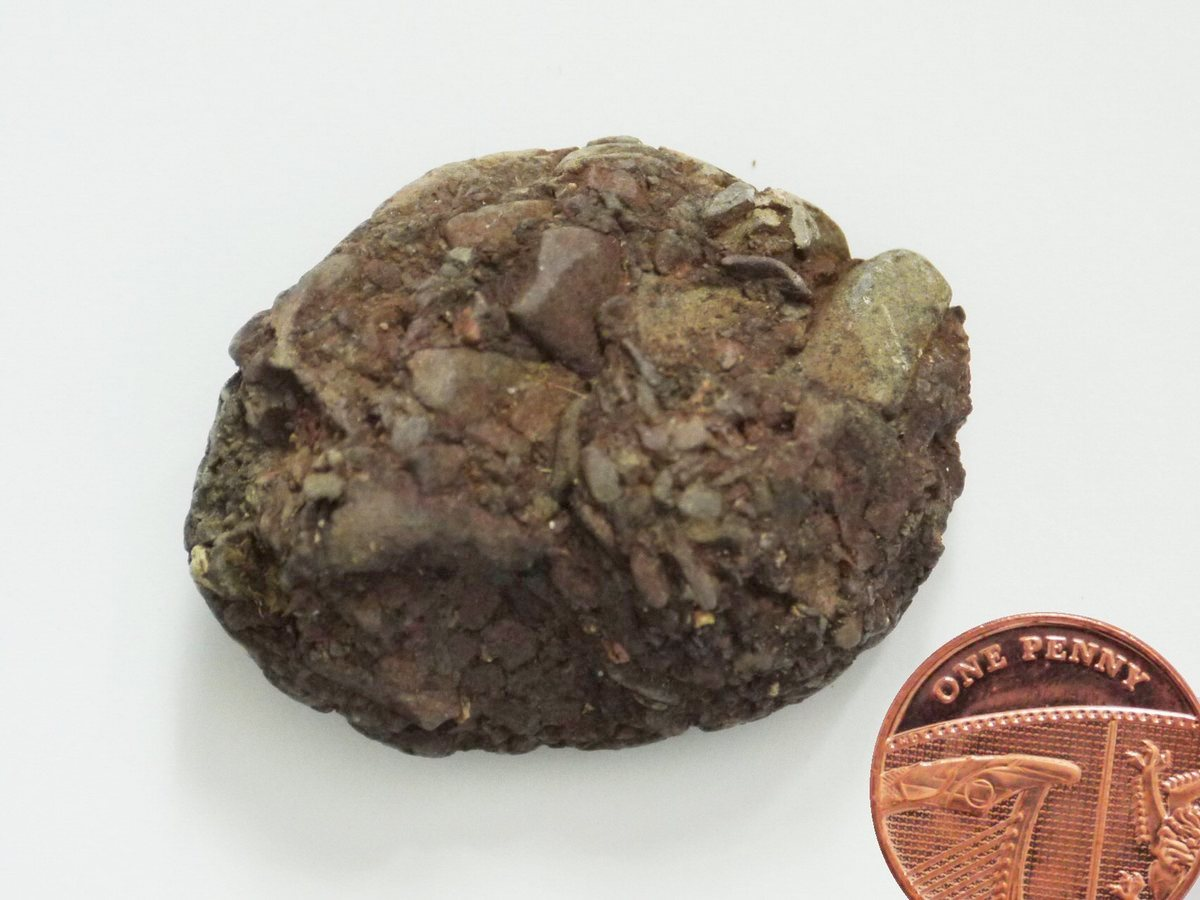
A pebble of Mell Fell Conglomerate, of late Devonian age, from the bed of the Wham Sike on Great Mell Fell

Both Great and Little Mell Fells are unique among the fells of the Lake District by being composed of the Mell Fell Conglomerate, a sedimentary rock formed from deposits of sand and gravel in alluvial fans and braided river channels in a desert environment. The rock contains no fossils. The stones in the conglomerate came from the erosion of both the Borrowdale Volcanic Group and the Windermere Supergroup. The reddish-coloured rock appears to date from the late Devonian Period, sometime around 375 million years ago. The erosion of this conglomerate has formed the smooth and rounded outlines that are distinctive of the two Mell Fells.

Rocks of the Devonian Period are also referred to as the Old Red Sandstone. These should not be confused with the younger New Red Sandstone of the Permian Period, found nearby in Penrith and the Eden Valley.

== Image gallery ==
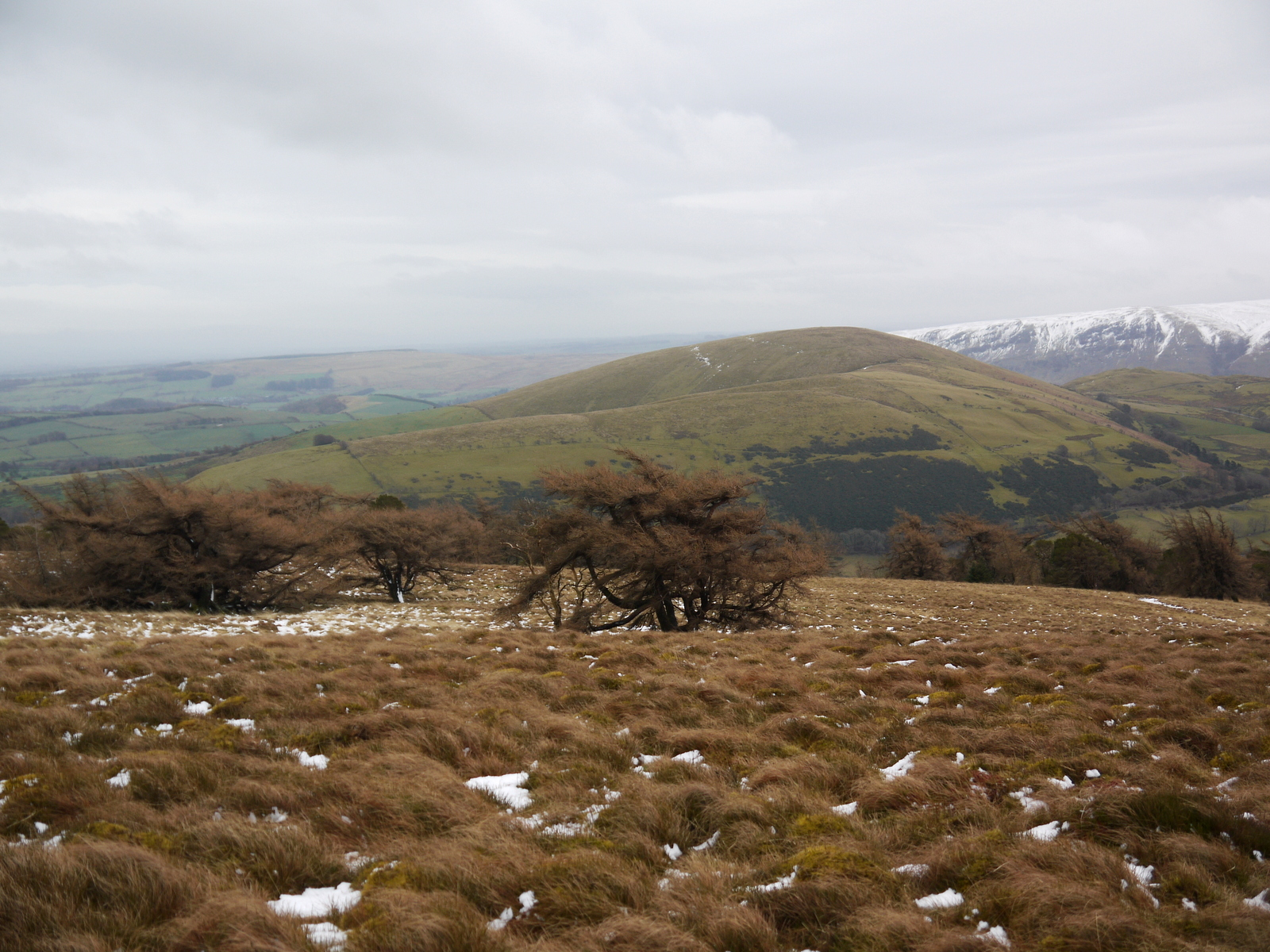
Little Mell Fell, seen from Great Mell Fell, showing the two ridges with the intervening valley

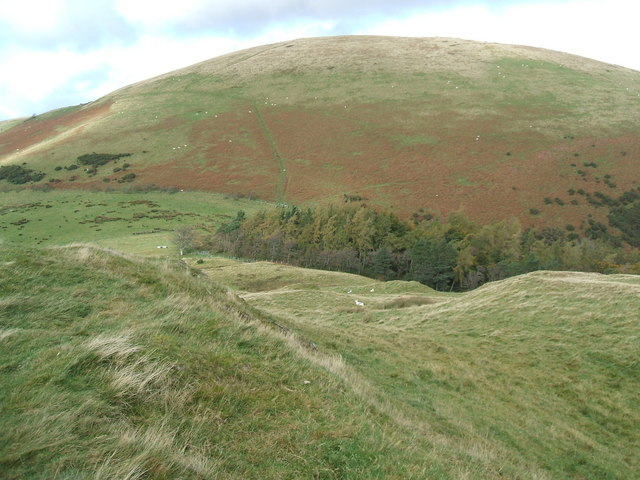
The grassy dome of Little Mell Fell, seen over The Hause from Watermillock Fell

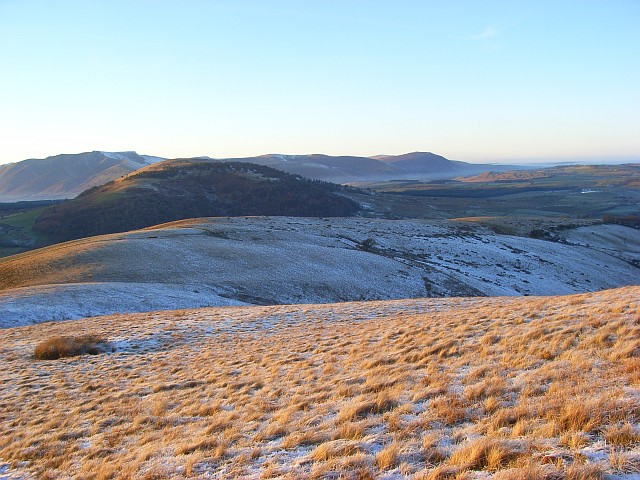
The rounded west ridge of Little Mell Fell, with Great Mell Fell beyond, and Blencathra and the Northern Fells in the distance

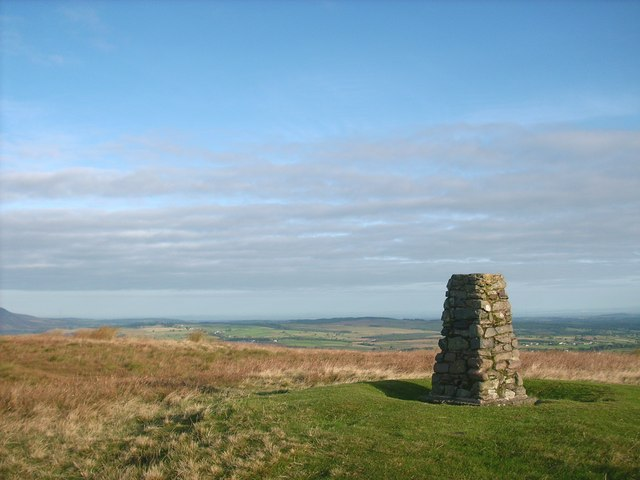
Triangulation pillar on the summit of Little Mell Fell
