= Stainton, Dacre =

Village in Cumbria, England

Coordinates: 54.643°N 2.799°W

Stainton
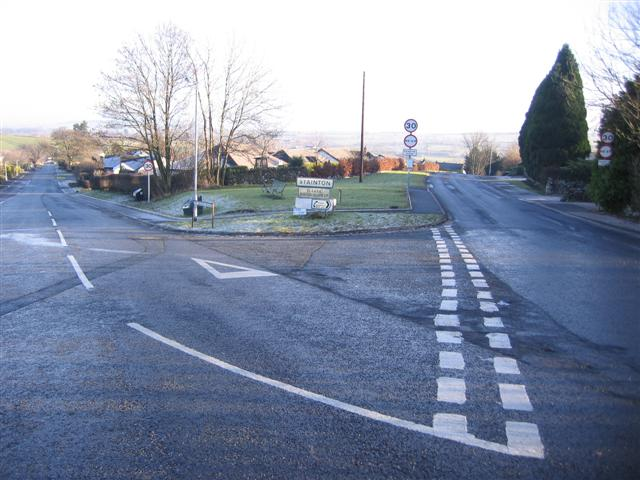
- Stainton

- Location in Eden, Cumbria Location within Cumbria
- Area: 0.4025 km^{2} (0.1554 sq mi)
- Population: 758 (2019 estimate)
  - Density: 1,883/km^{2} (4,880/sq mi)
- OS grid reference: NY483793
- Civil parish: Dacre
- Unitary authority: Westmorland and Furness
- Ceremonial county: Cumbria
- Region: North West
- Country: England
- Sovereign state: United Kingdom
- Post town: PENRITH
- Postcode district: CA11
- Dialling code: 01768
- Police: Cumbria
- Fire: Cumbria
- Ambulance: North West
- UK Parliament: Westmorland and Lonsdale

Stainton is a village near the A66, in the parish of Dacre, in the Westmorland and Furness district, in the English county of Cumbria. It is a few miles away from the market town of Penrith. It is in the parish of Dacre, although it is larger than Dacre. It has a Methodist church and a primary school. In 2019 the built-up area had an estimated population of 758. In 1870-72 the township had a population of 330.

== Transport ==
As of March 2026 the village has 3 bus routes serving it, all run by Stagecoach. The first is the 105 to Greystoke or Penrith. The second/third is the X4/X5 to Penrith or to Workington via Keswick and Cockermouth.

== See also ==
- Listed buildings in Dacre, Cumbria
