= Haverthwaite =

Village and civil parish in Cumbria, England

Coordinates: 54.243°N 3.005°W

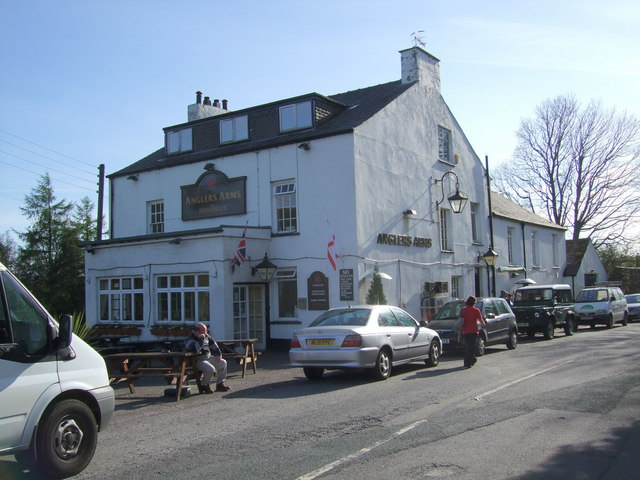
- The Anglers Arms

- Location in the former South Lakeland district Location within Cumbria
- Population: 797 (2011)
- OS grid reference: SD3483
- Civil parish: Haverthwaite
- Unitary authority: Westmorland and Furness
- Ceremonial county: Cumbria
- Region: North West
- Country: England
- Sovereign state: United Kingdom
- Post town: ULVERSTON
- Postcode district: LA12
- Dialling code: 01539
- Police: Cumbria
- Fire: Cumbria
- Ambulance: North West
- UK Parliament: Westmorland and Lonsdale

Haverthwaite is a small village and civil parish in the Furness region of Cumbria, England. It is also within the boundaries of the Lake District National Park. The village is 7 km or 4.5 miles NE of Ulverston and 5 km or 3 miles SW of the southern end of Windermere. It is near the tidal limit of the River Leven. In the 2001 census, the parish had a population of 728, which increased to 797 by 2011.

== Toponymy ==
The village gets part of its name from the Old Norse word thwaite, which usually refers to a clearing or settlement in the forest.

== History ==
Haverthwaite was originally a Viking settlement, but it has been suggested that there may have been a settlement of sorts there before the Vikings arrived.

In the 18th century, there were two iron furnaces near the village: one at Backbarrow and the other at Low Wood. The furnace at Backbarrow was supplied from 1711 with iron ore from Low Furness which would have arrived at the quays in Haverthwaite and been transported to Backbarrow by horse and cart.

In 1798, Low Wood gunpowder works was established and continued production until 1935. The nearby River Leven was used to transport the finished product.

In 1860, the Furness Railway opened its branch line that ran from Ulverston to Lakeside; almost overnight, the quays fell into disuse.

The vicarage was demolished in the 1970s to make way for the new route of the A590.

== Religion ==
St Anne's Church was originally a chapel under Colton; it was consecrated in 1825 and extended in 1838. When it was built, it received a grant on condition that 200 sittings were to be 'free and unappropriated for ever'. It appears in the music video of Never Went to Church by The Streets.

== Transport ==
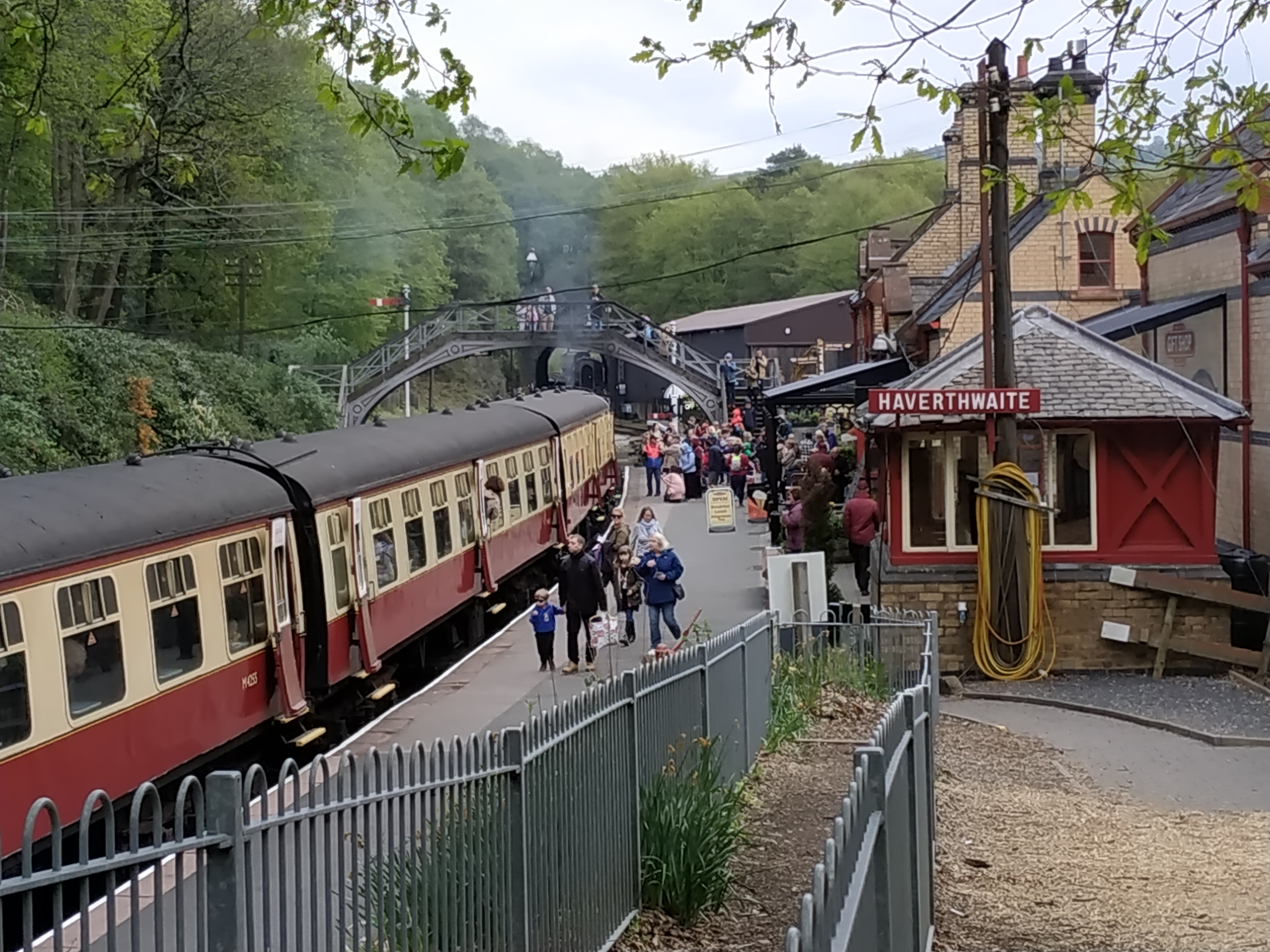
Haverthwaite station

Haverthwaite railway station is the south-western terminus of the preserved Lakeside & Haverthwaite Railway; it is a popular tourist attraction providing connections to Windermere via Newby Bridge and Lakeside. The line was once part of the Furness Railway from Ulverston.

The area is served by the number 6 bus route, operated by Stagecoach Cumbria; this connects Haverthwaite with Barrow-in-Furness, Bowness-on-Windermere, Grange-over-Sands, Kendal, Newby Bridge and Ulverston.

The A590 road runs to the north of the village, connecting Barrow-in-Furness to the M6 motorway close to Kendal.

== See also ==
- Listed buildings in Haverthwaite
