= Greenodd railway station =

Disused railway station in Cumbria, England

Coordinates: 54.2299°N 3.0527°W

Greenodd
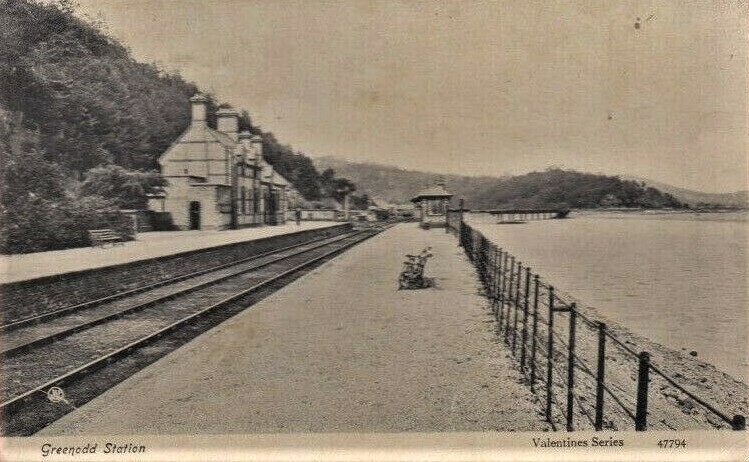

General information
- Location: Greenodd, Westmorland and Furness; England
- Platforms: 2

Other information
- Status: Demolished

History
- Pre-grouping: Furness Railway

Key dates
- 1869: opened
- 16 September 1940: closed
- 3 June 1946: reopened
- 30 September 1946: service suspended
- 13 June 1955: officially closed
Location
- Location within the former South Lakeland district Location within Cumbria

Greenodd railway station was on the route between Ulverston and Lakeside, built by the Furness Railway. It served the village of Greenodd, then in Lancashire and now in Cumbria, England, and trains were withdrawn from 30 September 1946 but was not officially closed until 1955. Train movements through the station continued until 1965, with the closure of the line to Lakeside.

A section of the line has reopened as part of the Lakeside and Haverthwaite Railway, but the station itself has since been demolished and the trackbed between itself and to the south towards Ulverston used for road improvements. However, if you walk down by the embankment of the estuary, you will see the east side platform buried underneath the road grass verge, with some remnants of the back wall and shelter building visible as well.

Preceding station	Disused railways	Following station
Ulverston; Line closed, station open	Furness Railway; Ulverston to Lakeside Line	Haverthwaite; Line closed, station open
