= Lindal railway station =

Disused railway station in Cumbria, England

Lindal
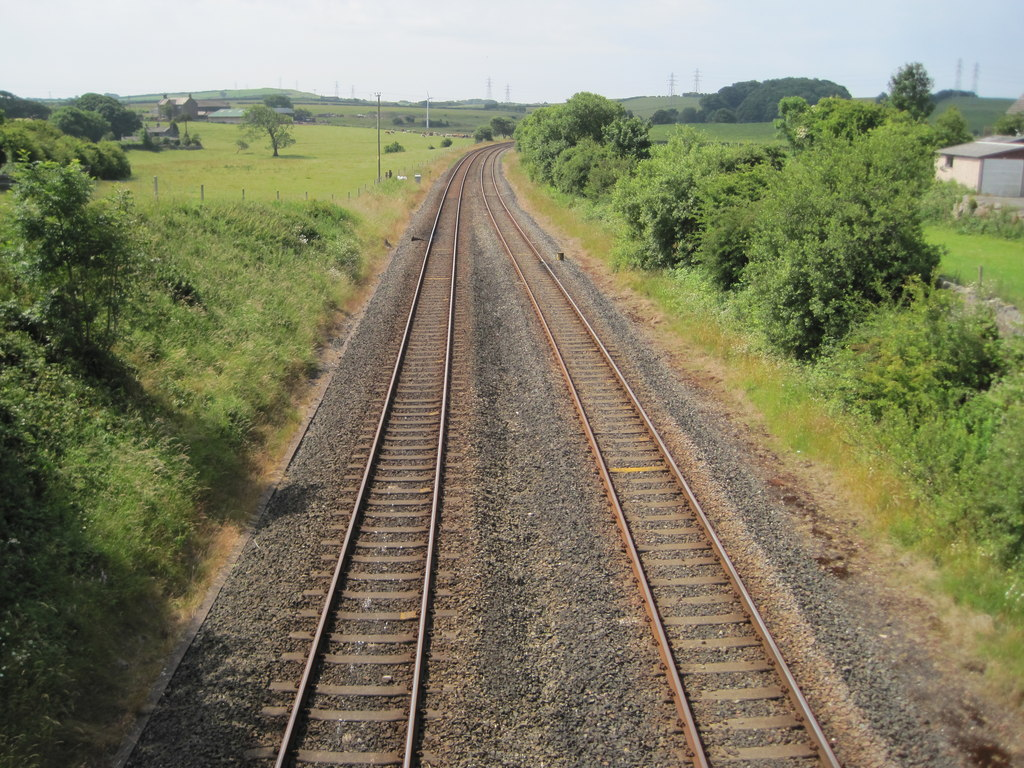

General information
- Location: Lindal-in-Furness, Westmorland and Furness; England
- Coordinates: 54.1691°N 3.1494°W
- Platforms: 2

Other information
- Status: Disused

History
- Original company: Furness Railway
- Pre-grouping: Furness Railway
- Post-grouping: London, Midland and Scottish Railway

Key dates
- 1851: Opened
- 1951: Closed
- 1951: Demolished
Location
- Location within the former Borough of Barrow-in-Furness Location within Cumbria

Lindal railway station served Lindal-in-Furness in the Furness area of Lancashire, England (now part of Cumbria).

== Context ==
Lindal station was situated west of London Road railway bridge just a short walk south of the main village and Ulverston Road. It served the local coal and iron ore mines in the local area, as well as the village and local candle factory.

It was opened on 6 May 1851 by the Furness Railway on the Furness Line and was shortly connected to the London and North Western Railway at Lancaster.

The station was closed on 1 October 1951 during a post-war cost cutting drive after nationalisation, by British Railways.

No remains of the station are present today apart from London Road bridge and an empty arch that used to pass the bay platform line to the east of the station.

== History ==
The Furness Railway was authorised in 1844 to build a line which would link Kirkby-in-Furness with Dalton-in-Furness. The railway was extended in places and subsequently took over the Whitehaven and Furness Junction Railway and the Ulverston and Lancaster Railway. The station at Lindal was opened in 1846 and began receiving passengers from further afield in 1862 (when the London and North Western Railway was directly linked). Passengers had already begun to travel from West Cumbria from 1865.

=== Lindal railway incident ===
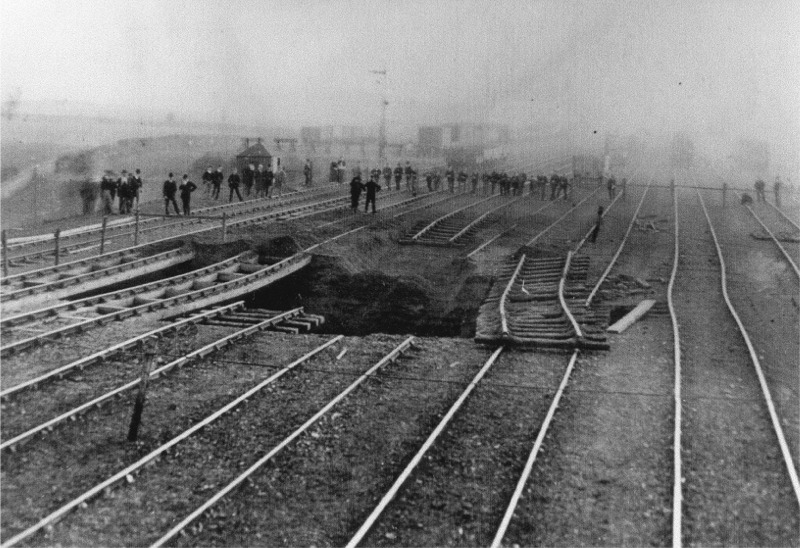
The hole that opened under the tracks at Lindal

On Thursday 22 September 1892 near Lindal station, a large hole had appeared beneath the railway, taking many lines out of use and swallowing up a locomotive. Rescue attempts were abandoned and the locomotive still lies underground at an unknown depth. The cause of the hole has been debated but remains unclear to this day.

The former site is situated on a wide embankment carrying only the two main lines that remain.

== Services ==
Services ran regularly with workers trains supplementing the local and express passenger services. Freight was transported to other parts of the country by rail or connected with the freight ships at Barrow.

Preceding station	Historical railways	Following station
Ulverston; Line and station open	Furness Railway	Dalton; Line and station open
