= Lakes Aquarium =

Aquarium in Cumbria, England

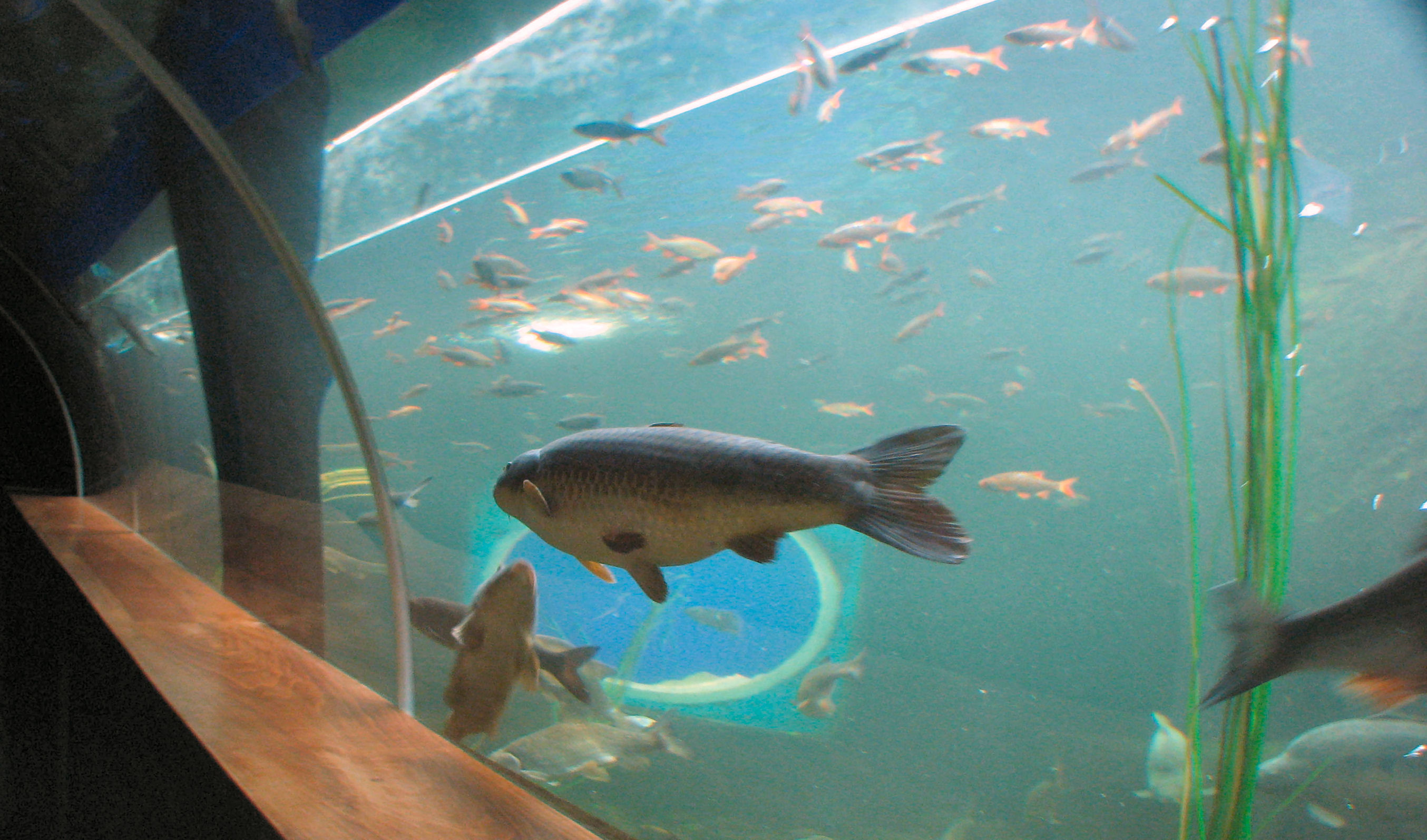
- Fish at the aquarium
- Interactive map of Lakes Aquarium
- 54.2781178°N 2.9558744°W
- Date opened: 1997 (as The Aquarium of the Lakes)
- Location: Lakeside, Cumbria, England
- Owner: Parques Reunidos
- Website: www.lakesaquarium.co.uk

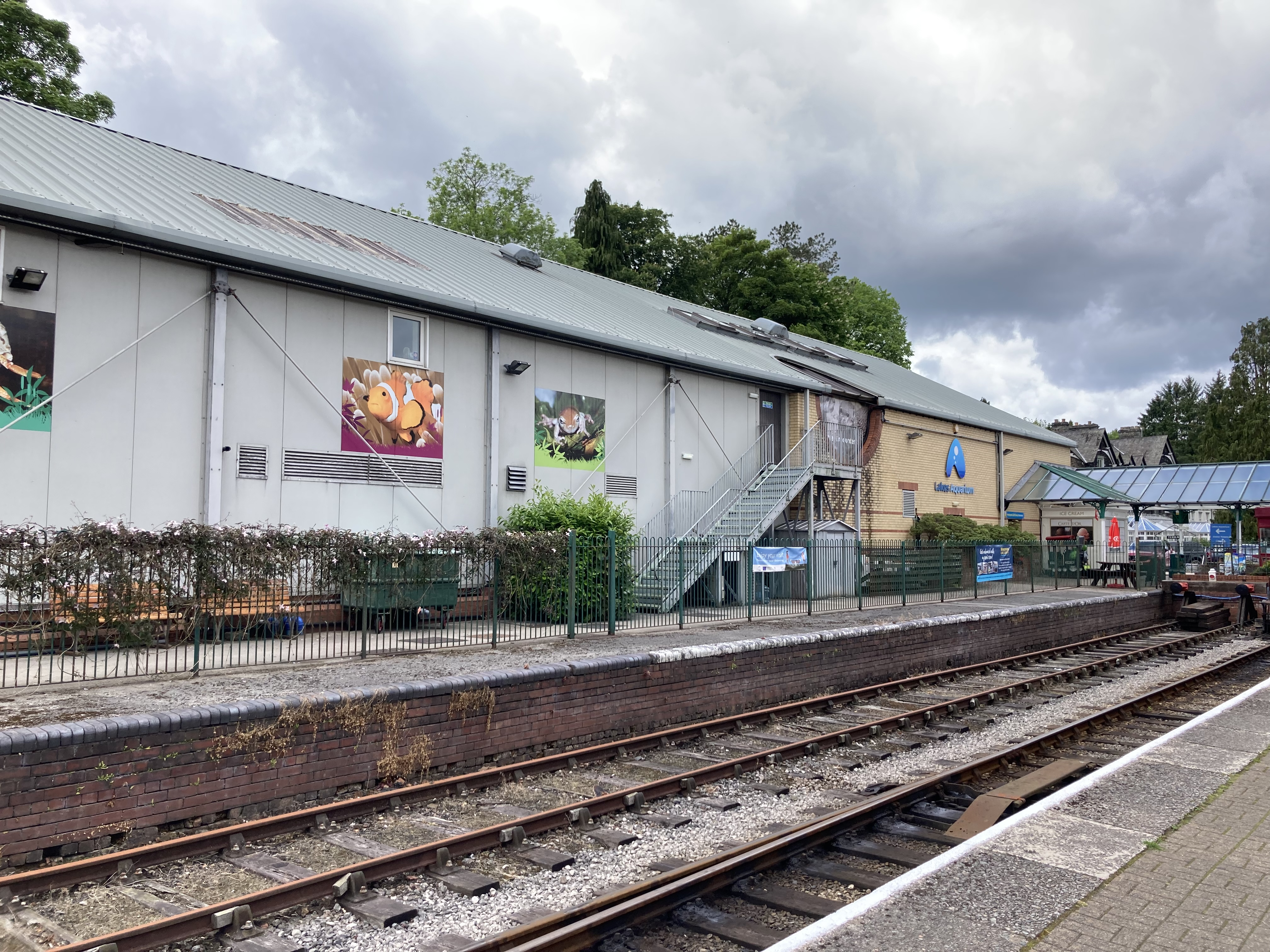
The Lakes Aquarium at Lakeside, Cumbria

The Lakes Aquarium is an aquarium in the village of Lakeside on the southern shore of Windermere, Cumbria, England. It is one of the docking points of Windermere Lake Cruises and also at one end of the Lakeside and Haverthwaite Railway. It is the third most visited paying tourist attraction in Cumbria.

== History ==
It opened in 1997 as The Aquarium of the Lakes when the displays followed the theme of a Lake District stream, flowing down into the lake and then on to Morecambe Bay. During 2008 it was re-branded as the Lakes Aquarium, with a theme of the lakes of the world. The attraction is now owned by Spanish leisure company Parques Reunidos, who own and operate 67 parks across the world.

== Exhibits ==
The Lakes Aquarium contains both freshwater and salt water aquatic animals.

=== Lake District ===
This area tells the story of the native and non native animals that can be found around the Lake District National Park. Captive breeding and research of the endangered White Clawed Crayfish constitute the conservation project for this area. It discusses the importance of not releasing animals from the pet trade, such as the terrapins, which can now be found surviving in the wild. All the terrapins in the aquarium were rehomed from members of the public.

Bream, Perch, Golden orfe, Koi carp, Eurasian harvest mice, Red-eared terrapins.

=== Asia ===
Oriental small-clawed otters.

=== Africa ===
Lake Malawi cichlids, bell hingeback tortoises, elephantnose, upside-down catfish, convict cichlids.

=== Americas ===
Angelfish, blind cave fish, common plec, cory catfish, red-bellied piranhas, rummy nosed tetras, lemon tetras, severum, axolotls.

=== Lakes ===
Arctic char, ballan wrasse, barbel, beadlet anemones, bib, Bloody Henry, brill, brook trout, butterfish or gunnel, chub, cod, coley, common bream, common carp, common hermit crabs, common pochard, common seahorses, common starfish, common sunstar, Connemara clingfish, crucian carp, cuckoo wrasse, dahlia anemones, diving ducks. edible crabs, flatfish, flounders, European lobsters, European sea sturgeons, European plaice, roach, rudd, sea anemones, sea bream, tench, tufted ducks, wels catfish.

=== Weirs ===
chub

=== Marine ===
beadlet anemones, butterfish, common hermit crabs, common starfish, common sunstar, Connemara clingfish, goby, blenny, cushion starfish, cuckoo wrasse, dahlia anemones, snakelock anemones, peacock worms, lumpsuckers, European plaice, purple sunstar.

=== Morecambe Bay ===
Seabass, pollock, turbot, thornback rays, wrasse.

== Virtual Diving Bell ==
The Virtual Diving bell incorporates images of underwater scenes displayed on three two metre diameter semi-spherical CG graphics screens.
