= Lindal railway incident =

1892 sinkhole near Lindal-in-Furness, Cumbria, England

Coordinates: 54.1724°N 3.1438°W

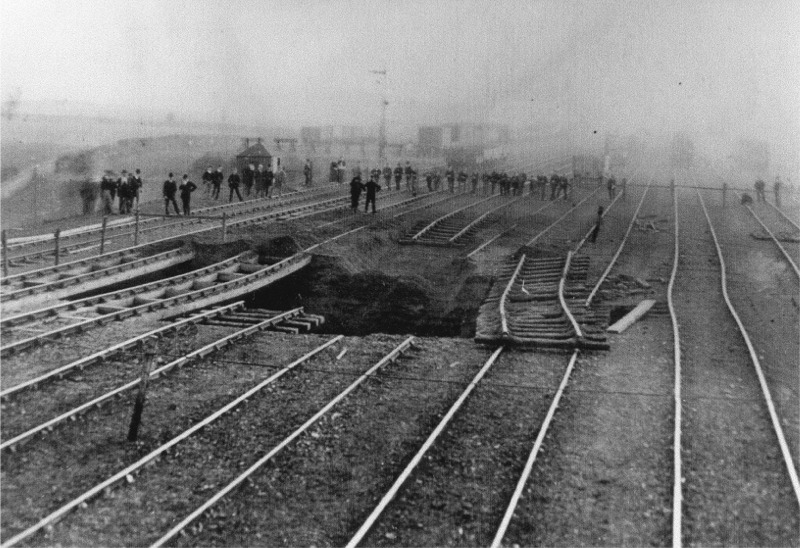
The hole at the Lindal sidings. Main lines at left on timber baulks.

The Lindal railway incident happened on Thursday 22 September 1892 near Lindal-in-Furness, a village lying between the Cumbria towns of Ulverston and Dalton-in-Furness. A Furness Railway D1 locomotive, No.115, was shunting in sidings when it disappeared into the ground after a large, deep hole opened up beneath it. The D1 was never recovered and still lies buried beneath the railway, though the depth remains a source of speculation.

== The story ==
East of Lindal station on the Barrow-Carnforth route, the two main lines and two goods lines ran along an embankment, with five sidings to the north. The 7am Barrow-Carnforth goods had stopped at the sidings behind Furness Railway locomotive No.115, a D1 class 0-6-0 built by the firm of Sharp Stewart between 1866 and 1885.

The ‘Sharpie’ (as the class were nicknamed) was busy shunting when the driver, Thomas Postlethwaite, saw cracks opening up in the ground right below. Knocking off steam, he jumped for his life, no sooner clear than the earth opened up to expose a sheer-sided hole 30 feet (9.1 m) across and similar in depth. The driver and his fireman stared in disbelief as their locomotive fell into it front first, the funnel and front part embedded, with only the tender remaining visible above the surface. The rails on which the engine had been standing were snapped off and went down with it, while the supporting baulks under the main lines were laid bare. The adjacent up passenger line was left hanging lopsidedly, its ballast having cascaded into the abyss.

== Rescue attempts ==
Breakdown gangs from the locomotive and permanent way departments attended with a crane and tool vans. The tender was uncoupled and pulled clear, but the locomotive itself weighed 35 tons and getting it out would be a massive task. The hole had appeared just 45 minutes before a Barrow-Carnforth passenger was due, and rumours soon went round that a whole passenger train had been swallowed up and scores of people had been killed and injured. People flocked to look, but were kept from going too close by railway staff and police.

At 2:30 pm, the men took a break for refreshments and had not been clear long when the hole suddenly deepened to about 60 feet – the locomotive falling further still until the earth closed over it and eclipsed it from sight. Witnesses were awestruck to see the huge machine disappear so quickly from their sight, falling to an unknown depth and beyond recovery. The hole was even wider by then, with all eight tracks now twisted and bent, the ballast having fallen away, the sidings over which they had been able to take empty coaches was now unsafe to use.

Passengers on the 2.57 from Carnforth were forced to abandon the train and had to walk down the adjacent road to Lindal Station, where another train took them on to Barrow. Thirteen conveyances were chartered, including large brakes, buses and horse-drawn carts for their luggage.

Trainloads of ballast continued to arrive and though most thought the worst had been seen, the full extent of the subsidence could only be guessed at and no one yet knew when rails might start to be safely relaid. The uppermost level of the mine workings were 500 feet (150 m) down and No. 115 was considered to be lost forever. Others speculated that the locomotive was only 80 to 90 feet (24 to 27 m) down.

The hole eventually swallowed up around 300 wagon loads of ballast until a solid foundation was established. A Board of Trade inquiry was held under the auspices of Major-General C.S Hutchinson, veteran of numerous rail accidents including the Tay Bridge disaster of 1879. Lindal may not have been a tragedy, but was a fascinating case all the same.

== Disruption ==
Immediately after the first collapse, passengers were forced to alight from their trains and walk around the crater to the far side. The empty carriages were then taken slowly over the dubious tracks, passengers resettling themselves once their train was back on solid ground. Passengers were eager to see the hole and crowded round to get a good look while officials tried to hurry them along. Goods and mineral traffic were a major source of revenue, so keeping them running was vital. Coke for the ironworks at Barrow, Askam and Millom, normally came via Carnforth and Lindal, but with the whole line at a standstill and Carnforth yard blocked with stalled goods trains, coke trains had to be redirected via Penrith and Whitehaven, an extra 100 miles (160 km), the same route being used for livestock, perishables and goods traffic for the Belfast boats. Up Barrow to Carnforth workings were also disrupted and again redirected round the Penrith route.

Great efforts were made to get southbound trains away as quickly as possible, so as not to miss connections at Carnforth. Removing all the mails from Thursday evening's 7.45 pm and 9.00 pm from Barrow was a long-winded affair, but all the bags were transferred to the onward train, and so efficiently that it caught the Night Mail at Carnforth. Friday morning's mail was similarly dealt with, done and dusted within an hour.

== Explanations ==
The embankment was encircled by a tell-tale pattern of dips and hollows indicating a history of subsidence. Shaky ground had already caused concerns, requiring trains to be ‘slowed’ before crossing a nearby bridge. Extra ballasting had been necessary and the two main lines, as well as having normal crossways sleepers also rested on longitudinal baulks of timber. A field below the embankment had a 70-by-30-foot (21.3 by 9.1 m) hollow nearly ten feet deep, and a nearby farmhouse had been abandoned because of subsidence. There were two levels of mine workings beneath the railway. The uppermost had not been used for some time, but miners in the lower level claimed they could hear trains above their heads and had already predicted a "big spill" someday.

== Further subsidence ==
Subsidence was reported again in November 1893, the line sinking by six feet very close to the 1892 subsidence. Traffic was again brought to a halt and worked single line until the problem was solved. Lancashire MP Colonel Thomas Sandys wrote to the Board of Trade with his thoughts, suggesting the mines be filled in or a bridge be built to span the unsafe ground altogether. The Board of Trade kept a watch on the Furness Railway for years afterwards, though directors were worried about adverse publicity.

== Alternative explanation ==
The explanation for the loss of No.115 given by a contemporary paper did not involve mining subsidence:

At the point where the subsidence took place there were large fissures in the rock, filled with sand. It is known that there is a subterranean stream below this, and it is supposed that owing to its action there has been a rush of sand, thus causing the subsidence

In other words, the engine had not fallen into mine-workings but into a cavity caused by the collapse of an underlying sand-filled wash-hole or sink-hole of which the Furness area has many, mostly formed in the Ice Age. Where an underground water course washes out the sand it leaves a void. Heavy rainfall would accelerate removal of the fill, and heavy rainfall did precede the event: "[w]ith the heavy rains of late, there had been considerable flooding in the neighbourhood, and it is to this cause that the disaster is probably due." At the time, the account given by The Engineer considered this possibility and identified how it might have been triggered by mining activity, but in the end thought it not the principal cause:

The railway at this point is undermined by the Parkside and Lindal Moor Mining Company, now leased by Messrs. Harrison, Ainslie, and Co., and for something like half a mile in length it is honeycombed by mining operations. For some time past evidence of the mine falling in, at any rate in its upper workings, has been seen, and on both sides of the railway embankment the ground has been gradually slipping for some time. The railway company, however, has been watching the action of this subsidence, and has placed a special watchman on the spot, with a view of detecting any change. Some time ago an adjoining farmhouse was let in, and the company found it necessary to prop up a railway bridge to prevent the line from collapsing. It is reported, however, that the workings of the Parkside mines have not been interfered with by the subsidence in the embankment, and that they exist intact under a stratification of rock which is as yet unshaken. The inference is that the vast volume of water which is pumped from the mines has caused percolation through the rock and left cavities in the upper strata which have caused a subsidence; but there is reason to believe that the subsidence which has now occurred is due mainly to the absolute fall of earth into old workings…

== In popular culture ==
The event provided the inspiration for the Arthur Conan Doyle story, "The Lost Special".

The incident has been the inspiration for the Rev. W. Awdry's railway series story "Down the Mine", and its Thomas and Friends adaptation. In the story and episode, Thomas the Tank Engine ignores a "danger" sign and falls into a small pit, later pulled out by Gordon, though that story may equally have been inspired by a similar incident in April 1945 where an industrial locomotive, still with its driver on board, fell into a disused mine shaft.
