= LMS Stanier Class 5 4-6-0 4806 =

Preserved British 4-6-0 locomotive

LMS 4806
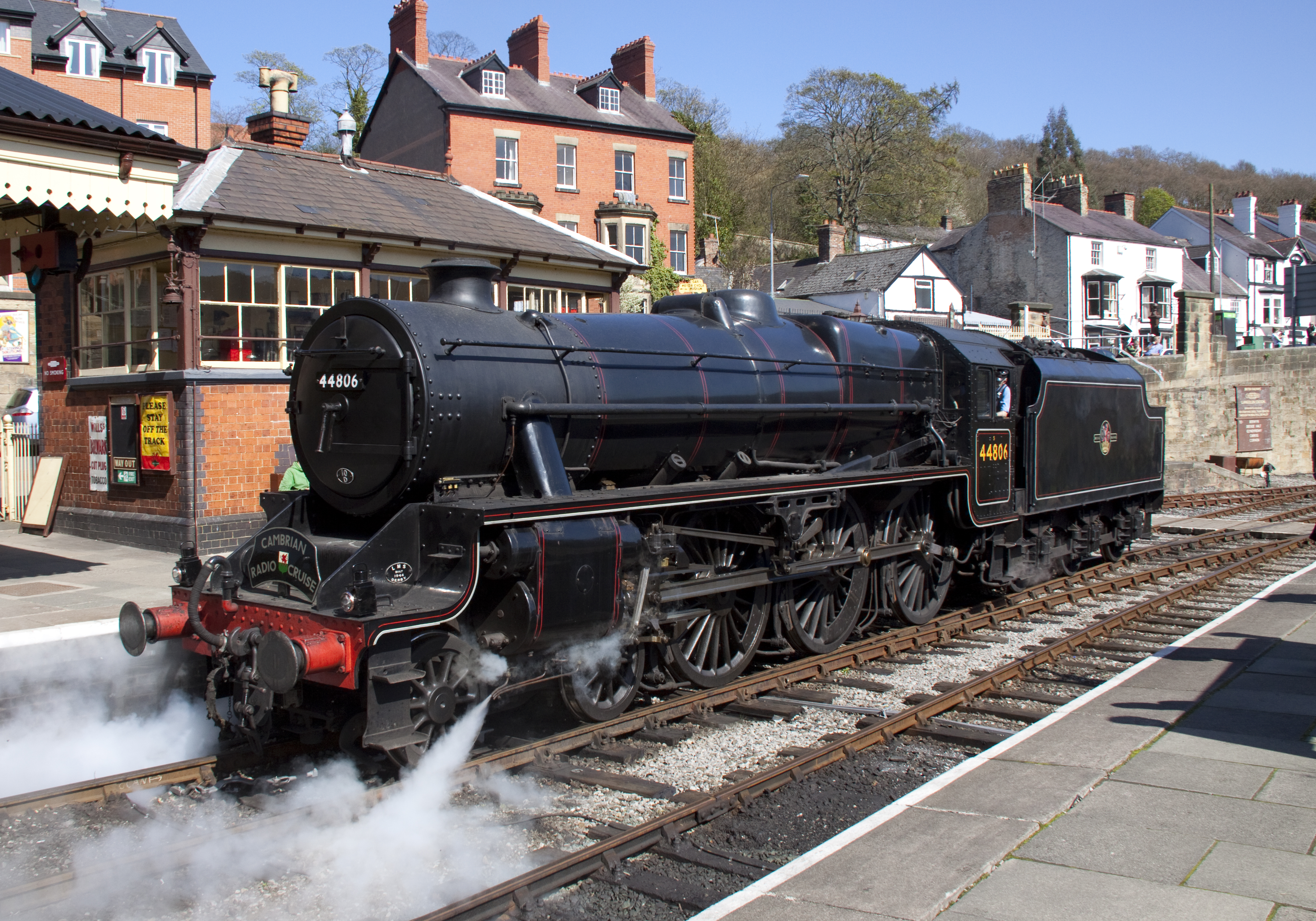
- 44806 Running around its train at Llangollen.
Type and origin
- Power type: Steam
- Designer: William Stanier
- Builder: Derby Works
- Serial number: 154 (second series)
- Build date: July 1944
Specifications
- Configuration
  - Whyte: 4-6-0
- Gauge: 4 ft 8 1/2 in (1,435 mm)
- Leading dia.: 3 ft 3 1/2 in (1.003 m)
- Driver dia.: 6 ft 0 in (1.829 m)
- Length: 63 ft 7 3/4 in (19.40 m)
- Fuel type: Coal
- Fuel capacity: 9 long tons (9.1 t; 10.1 short tons)
- Water cap.: 4,000 imp gal (18,000 L; 4,800 US gal)
- Firebox
  - Grate area: 28 1/2 sq ft (2.65 m^{2})
- Boiler: LMS type 3C
- Boiler pressure: 225 lbf/in^{2} (1.55 MPa)
- Cylinders: Two, outside
- Cylinder size: 18 1/2 in × 28 in (470 mm × 711 mm)
- Valve gear: Walschaerts
- Valve type: Piston valves
Performance figures
- Tractive effort: 25,455 lbf (113.23 kN)
Career
- Operators: London, Midland and Scottish Railway; → British Railways
- Power class: LMS: 5P5F; BR: 5MT
- Axle load class: BR: Route Availability 7
- Withdrawn: August 1968
- Current owner: North Yorkshire Moors Railway
- Disposition: Under Overhaul

LMS Stanier Class 5 4-6-0 No. 44806 is a preserved British steam locomotive. It was built at Derby in 1944.

== Service history ==
Originally numbered 4806 by the LMS, it had 40000 added to its number under British Railways after nationalisation in 1948. 44806 was one of the last locomotives to be withdrawn from service, surviving until 1968, the last year of steam on British Railways.

Shed allocations
Location	Shed code	From
Toton	18A	15 July 1944
Leicester	15C	28 April 1948
Nottingham	16A	9 December 1956
Kentish Town	14B	15 December 1956
Nottingham	16A	18 October 1957
Burton	17B	12 July 1964
Speke Junction	8C	26 June 1967
Lostock Hall	10D	30 March 1968

== Preservation ==
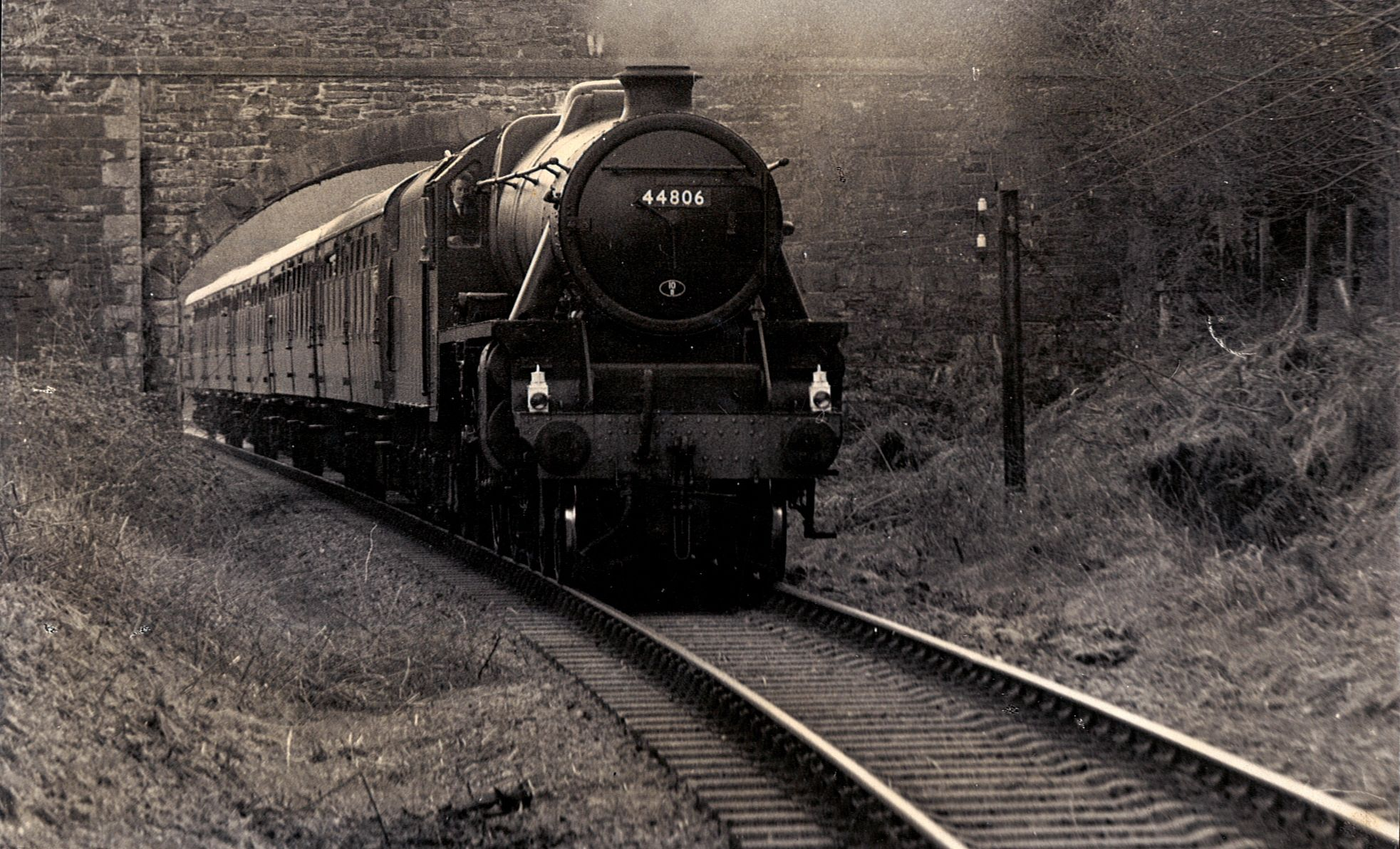
Approaching Newby Bridge in 1973

44806 was an early candidate for preservation, moving directly from BR to the "Steamtown" collection at Carnforth, where it was housed in the same locomotive depot where steam's final fires had been dropped only recently. This meant that it was not subjected to the years of neglect and parts-stripping at Woodham Brothers scrapyard in Barry, Vale of Glamorgan, South Wales which was the fate of many.

In preservation, it was unusually well-travelled between museums and lines, although staying in the North West of England. Some years were spent based in Accrington, with working excursions to a planned preserved line at Helmshore. Although these exact plans never quite came to fruition after that station's closure in 1972, most of the line survived as what is now the East Lancashire Railway.

In 1973, 44806 was based for a short time at the newly reopened Lakeside and Haverthwaite Railway, as their largest and only tender engine, but operating a large tender engine was difficult on a line without a turntable. Whilst at Haverthwaite, 44806 was adopted by the ITV children's TV series Magpie and named "Magpie". The Magpie programme was always in competition with the BBC's comparable Blue Peter programme, which had earlier adopted the LNER A2 Peppercorn 532 Blue Peter, conveniently built under that name.

Shortly after this, a crack was found in the boiler of 44806, in the outer firebox. Haverthwaite did not have the workshop facilities for an engine of this length or weight, so it was moved, this time to "Steamport" in Southport. These were busy times for the British steam preservation movement, with many new projects and scrapyard rescues all competing for attention, time and money. As a result, 'Magpie' languished. In 1983, Magpie was moved to Manchester and the Museum of Science and Industry, as a purely static exhibit.

=== Return to steam ===
In 1993, 44806, with its 20-year-old firebox crack, travelled to the Llangollen Railway, where repair work began. This work took almost three years to complete, with a return to steam on 15 September 1995. It worked on the Llangollen for nearly ten years, first back as 4806 in black LMS livery with red lining, then once again as 44806, wearing the BR "ferret and a dartboard" tender badges with red and white lining.

=== Return to steam again ===
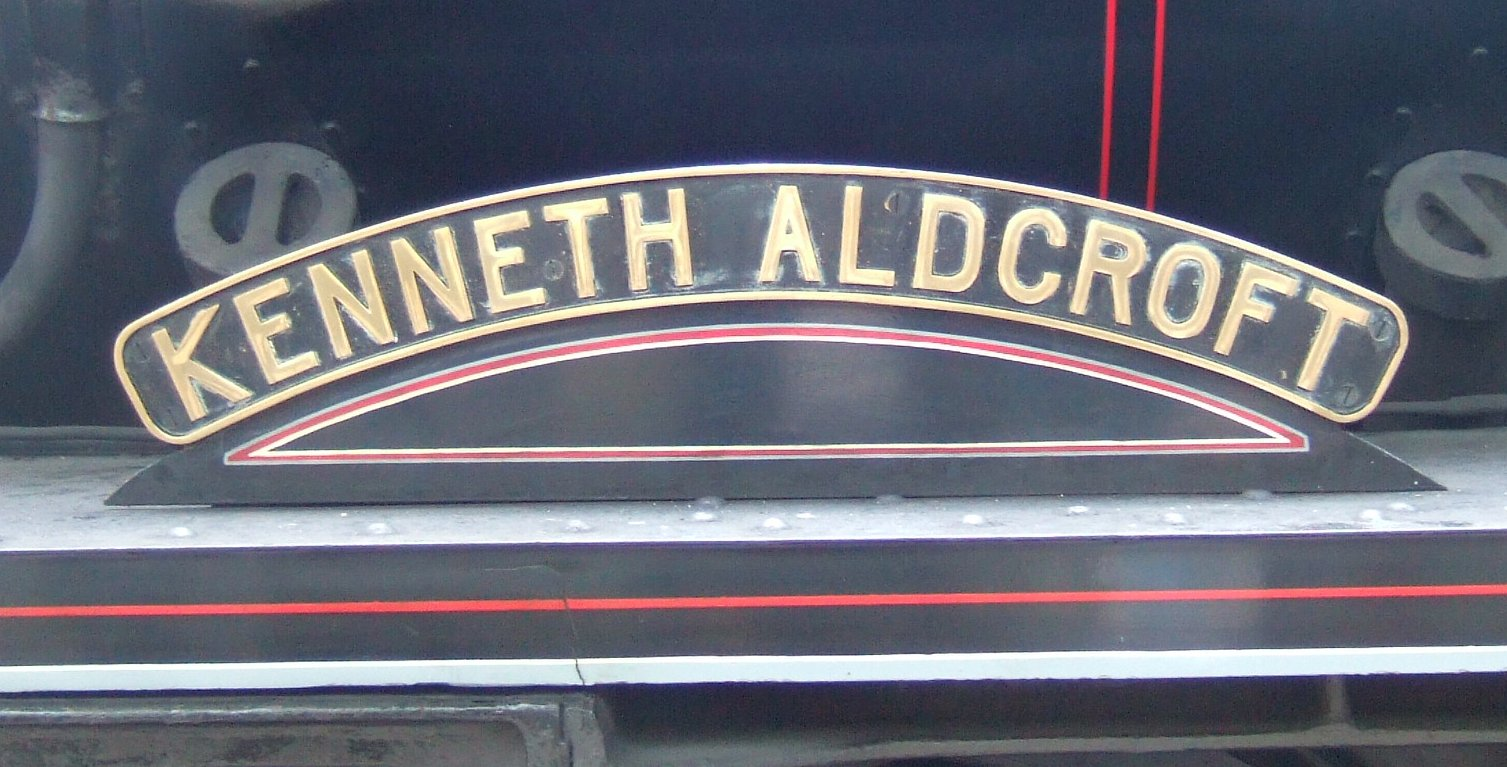
Kenneth Aldcroft nameplate

The expiration of the locomotive's 10-year boiler certificate prompted another rebuild. The work this time was less serious, being mostly wear items such as boiler tubes, firebox stays and worn tyres. The work was completed successfully and 4806 returned to steam on 29 August 2007 and was back in service on 14 September. The new livery was again BR period, but this time in unlined gloss black. The engine was not re-fitted with its Magpie nameplates.

Since its initial preservation, 44806 had been privately owned by one man, Ken Aldcroft. Aldcroft died in 2003, and 44806 passed to his daughter Ms Renee Wyatt. To commemorate Aldcroft's 35 years of preservation (he owned 44806 for ten years longer than the original owners), 44806 was renamed Kenneth Aldcroft.

== Current status ==
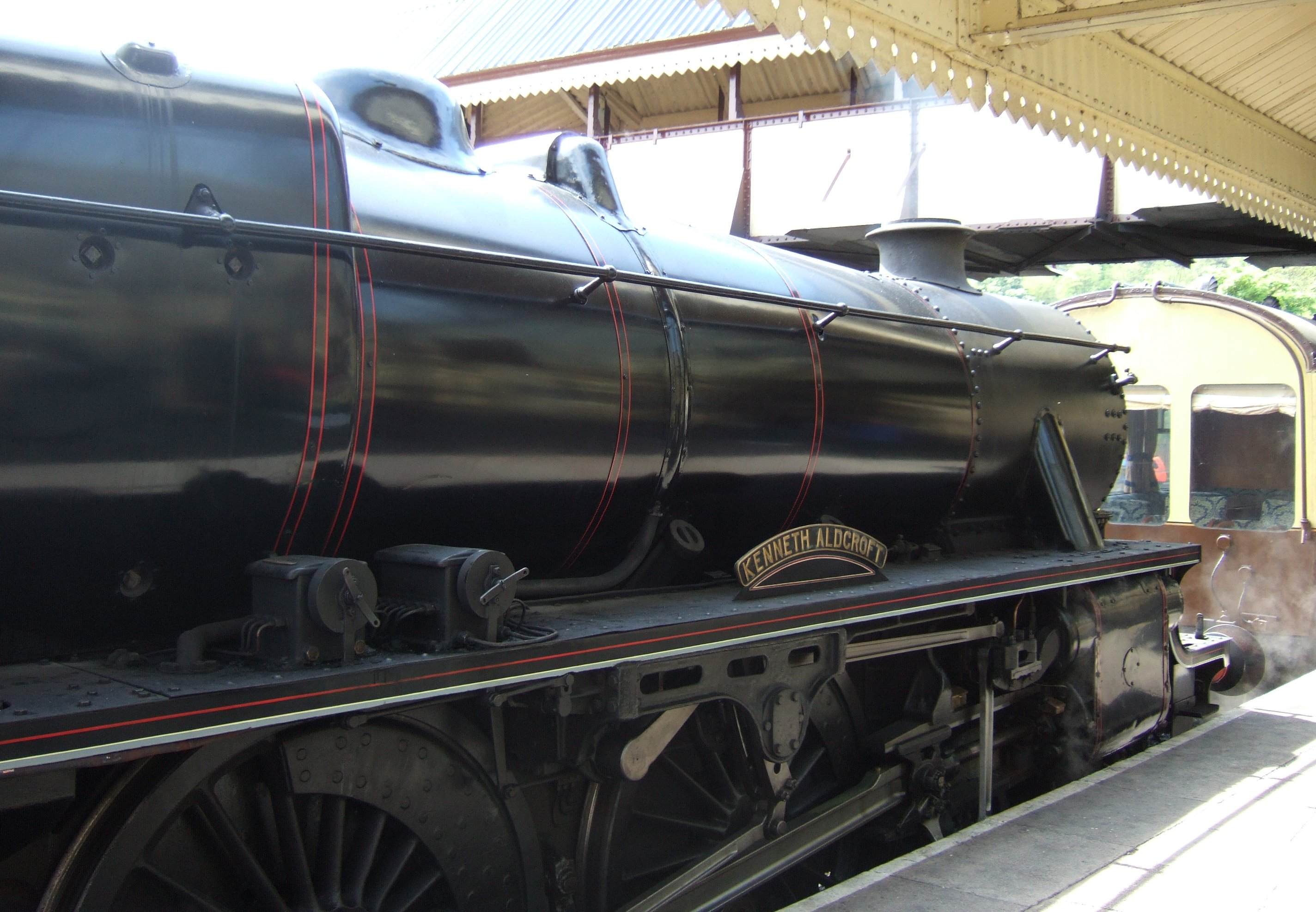
Llangollen station in 2010

44806 Kenneth Aldcroft was based and worked at the Llangollen Railway. 2008 was the 40th anniversary of the end of British Railways steam, and of 44806's own preservation. In July 2013, the locomotive was offered for sale, and was purchased by the North Yorkshire Moors Railway. Until January 2018 when its then boiler certificate expired, 44806 operated trains on the NYMR only between Grosmont and Pickering because it did not have mainline equipment fitted for use on trains running from Grosmont to Whitby.

Following two years of storage, in February 2020 the engine was sold from the NYMR to Peter Best with the intention of undertaking a full overhaul for a return to traffic with the intention that the engine will remain at the NYMR for use on their regular passenger trains. Alongside remaining as an NYMR based engine, having only run on heritage railways in preservation 44806's overhaul was to be done to mainline standards and be certified for use on the mainline, however the engine will only venture on the mainline running between Grosmont and Whitby with occasional visits to Battersby.

44806 emerged from the works in November 2023 following the completion of its latest overhaul and running in commenced in December 2023 with the intention of returning to full service in 2024. Now fitted with the required TPWS and GSM-R equipment for use on services travelling down to Whitby the engine will become part of the NYMR's mainline certified fleet of engines for Whitby services.
