= Furness Abbey railway station =

Disused railway station in Cumbria, England

Coordinates: 54°8′14.7″N 3°11′51.6″W

Furness Abbey
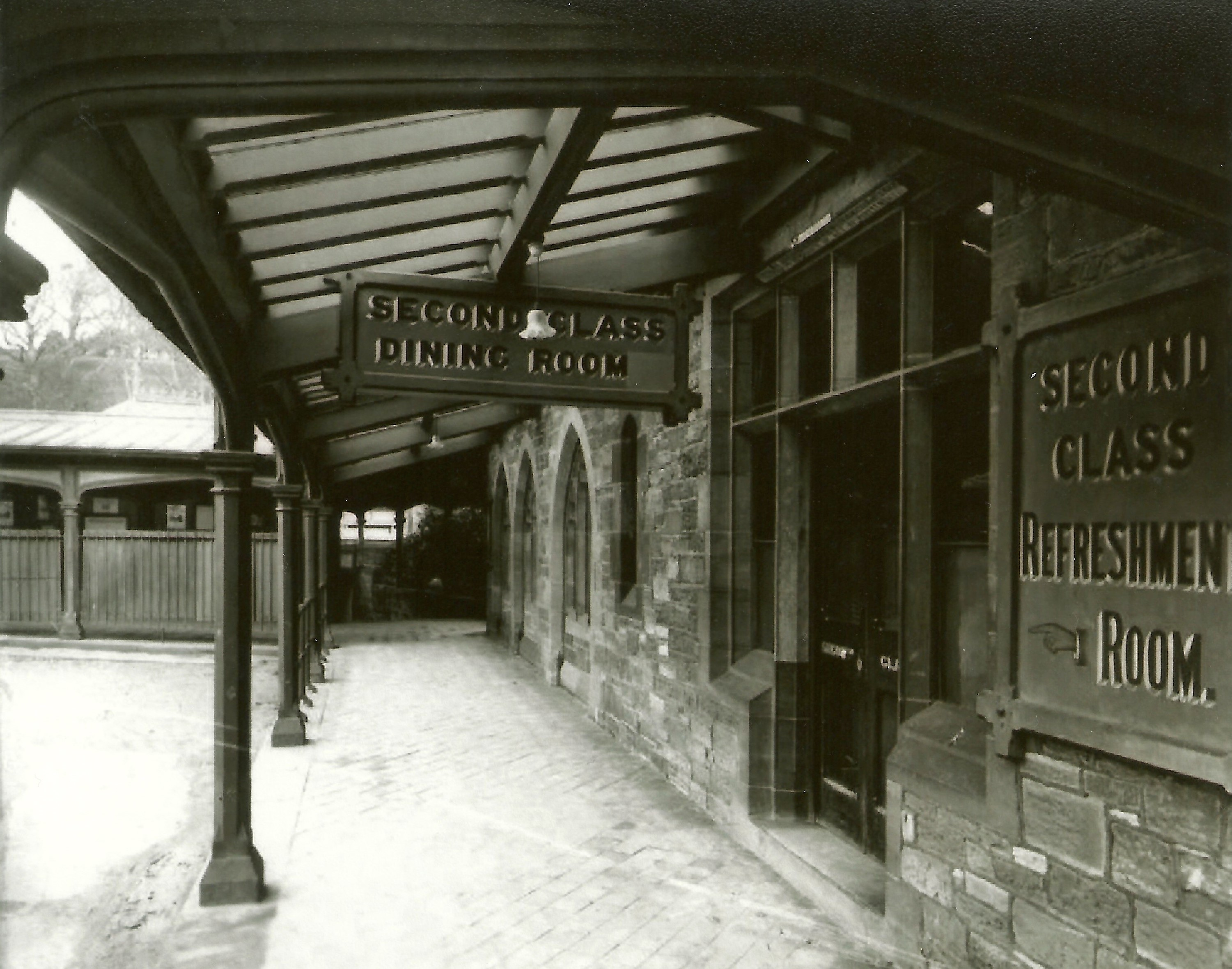
- The Booking Office and Refreshment Room around 1890

General information
- Location: Barrow in Furness; England
- Grid reference: SD 218 719
- Platforms: 3 (plus one private for Sir James Ramsden/Abbotswood)

Other information
- Status: Disused

History
- Original company: Furness Railway
- Pre-grouping: Furness Railway
- Post-grouping: London, Midland and Scottish Railway

Key dates
- 24 August 1846: Opened
- 25 September 1950: Closed
- 1950: Demolished
Location

Furness Abbey railway station was located in the Barrow-in-Furness area of the Furness Peninsula, England. It opened in 1846, closed in 1950 and was subsequently demolished.

== History ==
The Furness Railway was authorised in 1844 to build a line which would link Kirkby-in-Furness with Dalton-in-Furness. The railway was extended in places and subsequently took over the Whitehaven and Furness Junction Railway and the Ulverston and Lancaster Railway.

The station at Furness Abbey was opened in 1846 and was substantially enlarged by 1862 to receive passengers from further afield once it was directly connected to the London and North Western Railway. The station, one of the company's finest, was linked to the Furness Abbey Hotel which was also owned by the Furness Railway Company and was created to capitalise on the tourist trade. The station also served Abbotswood, the home of Sir James Ramsden, Managing Director of the railway company, and other large houses at the semi-rural north end of Barrow-in-Furness.

In the 1923 consolidation of British railway companies, the station became part of the London, Midland and Scottish Railway. It subsequently became part of British Railways after the 1948 nationalisation.

Having been damaged by German bombing in May 1941 (when the Furness Abbey Hotel was also hit), the station was closed by British Railways shortly after nationalisation and was subsequently demolished in the early 1950s along with the hotel. Apart from some old track-bed and demolition debris associated with Sir James Ramsden's private siding, the only surviving part of the station is the former ticket office/refreshment room, which became the Abbey Tavern. Since 1976 this has been recorded in the National Heritage List for England as a designated Grade II listed building. The semi-derelict former Tavern is still owned by English Heritage, despite having been reported in 2023 as sold.

== Services ==
Services stopped at Furness Abbey to allow passengers to visit the Abbey and to use the Furness Abbey Hotel. All services north of Barrow initially had to travel to Furness Abbey and then reverse back towards Dalton before continuing on to Askam. This practice ceased in 1882, when a loop line to the new central Barrow-in-Furness station on Abbey Road was completed and trains could continue from there northwards to Askam without reversing.

== Bibliography ==
- Bradshaw, George (1985) [1922]. July 1922 Railway Guide. Newton Abbott: David & Charles.
- Broughton, John R (1996). Past and Present Special: The Furness Railway. Wadenhoe, Peterborough: Past and Present Publishing Ltd. ISBN 1-85895-126-7.
- Butt, R. V. J. (October 1995). The Directory of Railway Stations: details every public and private passenger station, halt, platform and stopping place, past and present (1st ed.). Sparkford: Patrick Stephens Ltd. ISBN 978-1-85260-508-7. OCLC 60251199. OL 11956311M.
- Rush, Robert W. (1973). The Furness Railway 1843-1923. The Oakwood Library of Railway History. Lingfield: Oakwood Press. OL35.

Preceding station	Historical railways	Following station
Dalton; Line and station open	Furness Railway	Roose; Line and station open
Dalton; Line and station open	Furness Railway	Rampside; Line and station closed
