= Listed buildings in Lindal and Marton =

Lindal and Marton is a civil parish in Westmorland and Furness, Cumbria, England. It contains 14 listed buildings that are recorded in the National Heritage List for England. All the listed buildings are designated at Grade II, the lowest of the three grades, which is applied to "buildings of national importance and special interest". The parish contains the villages of Lindal-in-Furness and Marton, and the surrounding countryside. The listed buildings are all in the villages, and consist of two farmhouses with farm buildings in Marton, and houses, farmhouses and farm buildings, the village hall, and the church in Lindal-in-Furness.

== Buildings ==
Name and location	Photograph	Date	Notes
Gate Farmhouse and farm buildings 54.18404°N 3.16526°W	—	Early 17th century (probable)	The buildings were extended and altered in the 18th and 19th centuries. They are in limestone and slate rubble with slate roofs, and the house and front of the barn are rendered. The house has two storeys, three bays, a porch flanked by sash windows, and casement windows in the upper floor. The barn to the left is L-shaped, and contains quoins, an arched wagon entrance, doors, windows, and ventilation slits.
Drigg and Irton Church Farmhouse and barn 54.17240°N 3.15066°W	—	1635	The barn dates probably from later in the 17th century, and a rear wing was added to the house in the 19th century. The buildings are roughcast over stone and have a slate roof. The house has two storeys and three bays. The doorway has a chamfered surround and a triangular head, and above it is a hood mould and a datestone. The windows are mullioned, and all have hood moulds. The barn to the left has four bays, two lean-tos with casement windows, and a wagon entrance.
Lindal Moor Farmhouse and farm buildings 54.17340°N 3.15148°W	—	Late 17th to early 18th century	The farmhouse and farm buildings are in limestone and slate rubble, with slate roofs, and enclose a rectangular yard. The house has two storeys and four bays, with a single-storey wing at the rear. The doorway has a moulded stone hood on shaped brackets, and the windows are casements. The farm buildings have openings of various types.
Marton Hall and farm buildings 54.18459°N 3.16558°W	—	Mid 18th century	The farmhouse and farm buildings are in roughcast stone with green slate roofs, and together form a U-shaped plan on three sides of a courtyard. The house has two storeys and an attic, and three bays. Steps lead up to a doorway with a slate canopy, and the windows are casements with cambered heads.
7 and 8 The Green; 54.17388°N 3.15056°W	—	Late 19th century	A pair of semi-detached mirror-image houses in limestone and slate rubble, with quoins and a slate roof, in two storeys. Each has a gabled porch on the outer part of the front containing a casement window and a square-headed doorway. The other windows are sashes, those in the upper floor in gabled half-dormers.
9–12 The Green; 54.17408°N 3.15072°W	—	Late 19th century	A terrace of four houses in limestone and slate rubble, with quoins, a moulded cornice, and a slate roof. They have two storeys, and each house has one or two bays. The doorways have chamfered quoined surrounds and fanlights, and the windows, which are sashes, have quoined reveals and chamfered lintels.
24–28 The Green; 54.17389°N 3.15139°W	—	Late 19th century	A terrace of five houses in limestone rubble, with quoins, and a slate roof. They have two storeys, each house has one or two bays, and there are three wings at the rear. The doorways have chamfered quoined surrounds and fanlights, and the sash windows have quoined reveals and chamfered lintels.
30–34 The Green; 54.17302°N 3.15134°W	—	Late 19th century	A terrace of five houses in limestone rubble, with quoins, and a slate roof. They have two storeys and attics, each house has one bay. The doorways are on the right, and have raised surrounds with stopped chamfers and plain fanlights. Nos. 32 and 34 have sash windows, and the windows in the other houses are casements. Each house has a gabled dormer.
Buccleuch Hall; 54.17346°N 3.15029°W	—	c. 1875	A village hall built for the Duke of Buccleuch, it is in limestone and slate rubble, with sandstone dressings, quoins, and a slate roof. The hall has one storey and six bays. The outer bays contain gabled porches containing sash windows, and doorways with Tudor arched heads. The windows in the other bays are casements with projecting sills and quoined surrounds.
High Farmhouse; 54.17417°N 3.15127°W	—	1879	The farmhouse is in limestone and slate rubble, with sandstone dressings, quoins, and a slate roof. There are two storeys and three bays. The doorway has a quoined surround, a Tudor arched lintel, a datestone, and a shaped hood mould. The windows are sashes with quoined surrounds, chamfered mullions, and hood moulds. At the rear is a two-storey porch incorporating a re-set dated lintel.
Low Farmhouse; 54.17297°N 3.15009°W	—	1883	The farmhouse is in limestone and slate rubble on a chamfered plinth, with sandstone dressings, quoins, a moulded eaves cornice, and a slate roof with coped gables and ball finials. There are two storeys, three bays, and a rear wing. In the centre is a gabled two-storey porch with a Tudor arched opening, a hood mould, a date plaque, a ball finial, and containing a door with a fanlight. The windows are mullioned and contain sashes.
St Peter's Church; 54.17279°N 3.15145°W		1885–86	The church is in sandstone with a green slate roof. It consists of a nave with a gabled south porch and one-bay aisles at the east end, and a chancel with transepts, one used as a vestry, and the other as an organ chamber. Towards the east end of the nave is a slate-hung bellcote with a pyramidal roof and an octagonal spirelet.
Lindal-in-Furness War Memorial; 54.17253°N 3.15029°W		1921	The war memorial stands at a road junction. It is in Stainton limestone, and consists of a square base, a tall plinth with a moulded foot and a tapering cap. On this is a Latin cross with a wreath carved on the front. On the front of the plinth is an inscription, and on the sides are the names of those lost in the two World Wars.
Marton War Memorial; 54.18380°N 3.16447°W	—	1921	The war memorial stands in an area enclosed by a wall and railings. It is in Stainton limestone, and consists of a square base, a tall plinth with a moulded foot and a tapering cap. On this is a Latin cross with a wreath carved on the front. On the front of the plinth is an inscription, and on the sides are the names of those lost in the two World Wars.
