= Furness Railway Trust =

Heritage Railway Organisation in NW England

Coordinates: 53.7588°N 2.7561°W

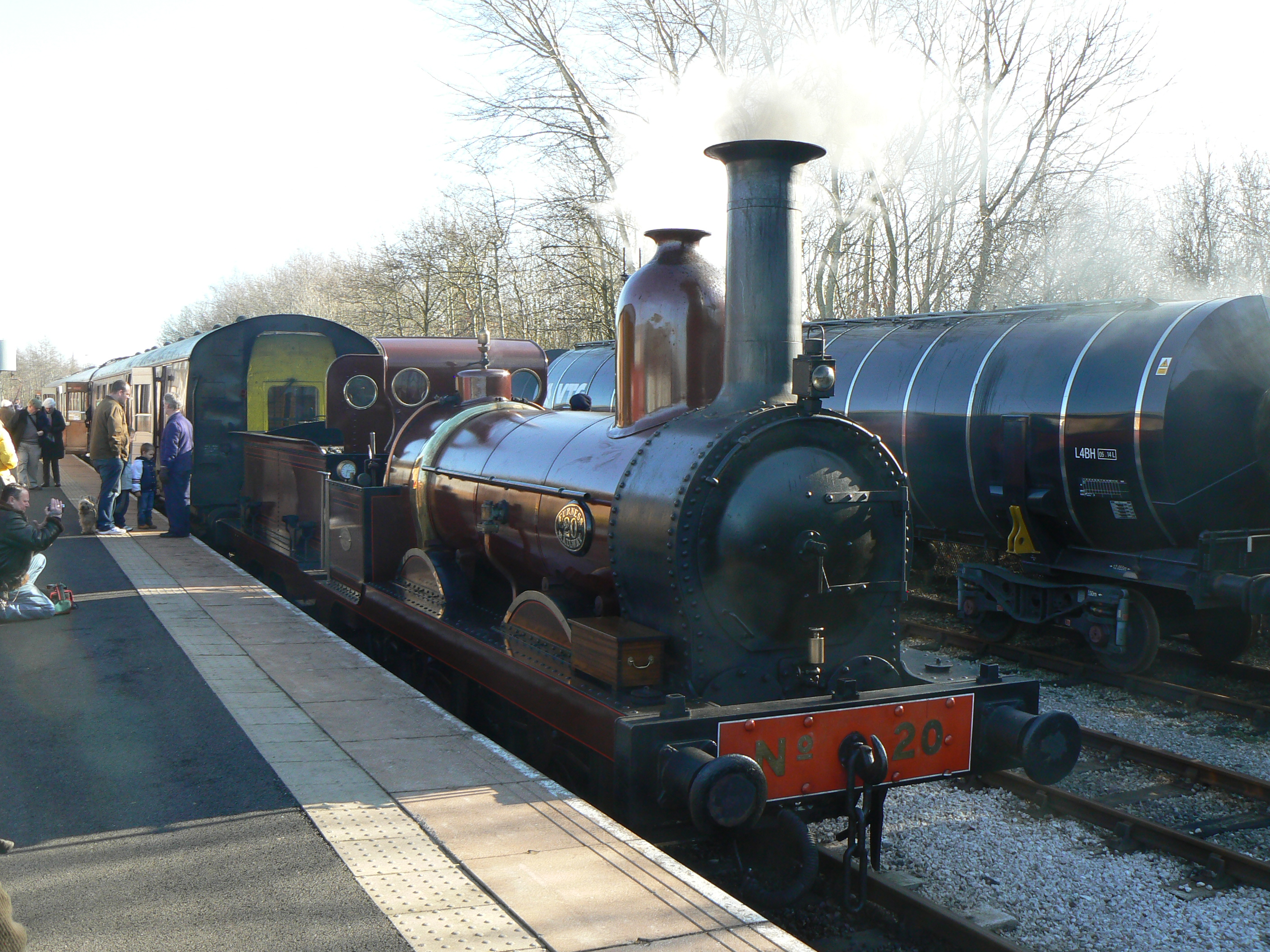
The FRT's Furness Railway No 20 at the Ribble Steam Railway in February 2012

The Furness Railway Trust is a heritage railway preservation organisation many of whose properties were originally owned by the Furness Railway. It is now based at the Ribble Steam Railway at Preston, Lancashire, England following its relocation from the Lakeside and Haverthwaite Railway. Accommodation which is shared with the Ribble Steam Railway has been built and is used to house, restore and maintain the Trust's locomotives and other vehicles. The Trust often hires its locomotives and stock to other privately owned railways in the UK where they can be seen at work and on display.

The Trust owns two Sharp, Stewart and Company locomotives:

- Furness Railway Nº20, Britain's oldest working standard gauge steam locomotive, is now operational following the completion of its second 10-year overhaul and rebuild to its original form.
- Furness Railway Nº25, ownership passed to FRT in 2015 after the death of Bert Hitchen, it is to be restored to operating order as an 0-4-0ST, the form in which it was rebuilt for the Barrow Hematite Steel Company when sold by Furness Railway. The locomotive is now at the Trust's base at the Ribble Steam Railway following its transfer from 'Steamtown' - (formerly Carnforth MPD).

Additionally, the Trust also owns:

- Peckett and Sons 'OY' Class 0-4-0ST 'No.1'. Completed by the Peckett Works in February 1937 for Courtaulds Red Scar Works Preston. In May 1973 and named 'Caliban', it hauled the first trains on the Lakeside & Haverthwaite Railway. Currently undergoing overhaul at Preston, contracts have been let for the manufacture and refurbishment of many new parts.
- GWR 5600 Class 0-6-2T No. 5643, acquired by the Lakeside Railway Society and restored to working order at Haverthwaite. It is currently undergoing an overhaul at Preston. It is hoped that overhaul will be completed in 2026.
- GWR Hall Class 4-6-0 No. 4979 Wootton Hall was purchased by the Trust in 1994 from the Fleetwood Locomotive Centre. It was moved to and stored at the Lytham Motive Power Centre and later to Appleby. In 2014 the loco and tender were moved to the Trust's workshop at Preston where much progress has been made and many parts have been trial fitted to the locomotive. An original Collett 3400-gallon tender tank was located, purchased, restored and has been fitted to the tender frames using as many of the reusable parts as possible from the original tank.
- War Department No. WD 194 Hunslet Austerity 0-6-0ST now named Cumbria It is currently undergoing overhaul at Preston.
- John Fowler & Co. 0-4-0DM, 'No.2' Fluff, Being rebuilt at Preston, a replacement engine has now been obtained.

The Trust also owns several other passenger and goods vehicles, including:

- A North London Railway 2nd Class carriage (currently on hire to the Beamish Open Air Museum)
- Great Eastern Railway No.5 Princess Alexandra's Royal Saloon. Following an extended period of hire at the Beamish Open Air Museum the coach returned to Preston for refurbishment. It is now in use at the Ribble Steam Railway and is available for hire.
- A set of vintage carriages which when restored will be formed into a vintage passenger train.
- The only surviving Furness Railway goods wagon - bogie bolster No. 5999
- LMS goods brake van no. M731874 (currently at the Rutland Railway Museum in the East Midlands)
