= Dalton railway station =

Railway station in Cumbria, England

Dalton
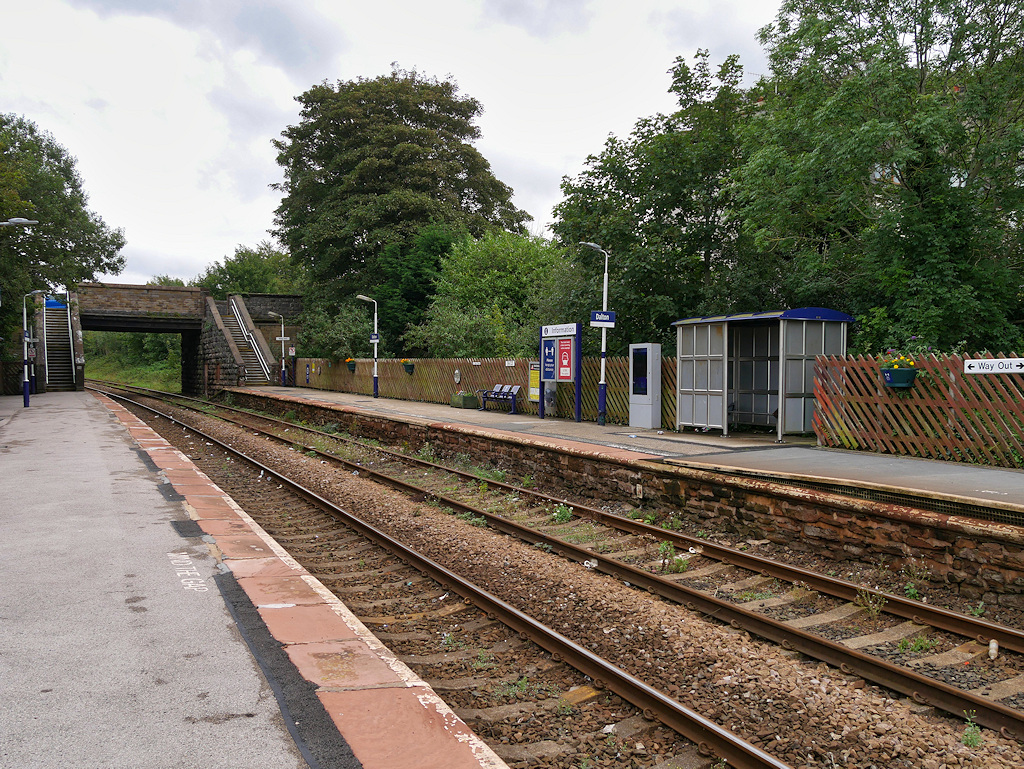

General information
- Location: Dalton-in-Furness, Westmorland and Furness; England
- Coordinates: 54°09′15″N 3°10′44″W
- Grid reference: SD231737
- Owner: Network Rail
- Manager: Northern Trains
- Platforms: 2
- Tracks: 2

Other information
- Station code: DLT
- Classification: DfT category F2

History
- Original company: Furness Railway
- Pre-grouping: Furness Railway
- Post-grouping: London, Midland and Scottish Railway; British Rail (London Midland Region)

Key dates
- 24 August 1846: Opened

Passengers
- 2020/21: ▼25,286
- 2021/22: ▲76,932
- 2022/23: ▼68,796
- 2023/24: ▲74,906
- 2024/25: ▲78,420
Location
- Location within the former Borough of Barrow-in-Furness Location within Cumbria
Notes
- Passenger statistics from the Office of Rail and Road

Dalton is a railway station on the Furness Line, which serves the town of Dalton-in-Furness in Cumbria, England. It is owned by Network Rail and managed by Northern Trains.

== History ==
Construction of the Furness Railway was authorised in May 1844. It was opened in stages: the line between Dalton and Barrow was in use (on an unofficial basis) by 3 June 1846, as was the line between Salthouse Junction and Piel. A line between Dalton and Kirkby was opened on 12 August 1846, when the earlier sections were officially opened. Dalton station was opened to passengers on 24 August 1846. An eastward extension from Dalton to Ulverston was authorised on 27 July 1846; it did not open until April 1854.

The station once had three platforms; however, only two are in use today. The disused one is adjacent to the Barrow-bound platform, from which it is separated by a wooden fence. The area is now very overgrown and inaccessible to the public.

== Facilities ==
The station is unstaffed, with a card-only ticket machine on the southbound side; passengers have to obtain a promise-to-pay notice to pay by cash on board the train. Digital signs and timetable posters are provided on each platform for train running information purposes. The station buildings are no longer in rail use, though shelters are located on each side. Access to the platforms is either via steps from the over bridge at the south end or via paths from adjacent public roads (the latter are step-free).

== Services ==
It receives a roughly hourly service (Mon-Sat) to Lancaster via Ulverston and to Barrow-in-Furness. Most trains continue to Preston and Manchester Airport southbound and some continue to Carlisle via Millom northbound. On Sundays, there is also an hourly service each way, with a few through trains and from Carlisle since the summer 2018 timetable change.

== Freight diversionary line ==
Freight trains for the Cumbrian Coast Line (most notably nuclear reprocessing traffic) leave the line about a kilometre west of Dalton and take the direct line northwards to Askam. This route (the original 1846 line from Kirkby-in-Furness and Barrow to Dalton) avoids having to go through Barrow station.

| Preceding station | National Rail | Following station |
|---|---|---|
| Roose | Northern Trains; Furness Line | Ulverston |
| | Historical railways | |
| Furness Abbey | Furness Railway | Lindal |
