= Lakeside railway station (England) =

Heritage railway station in Cumbria, England

Lakeside
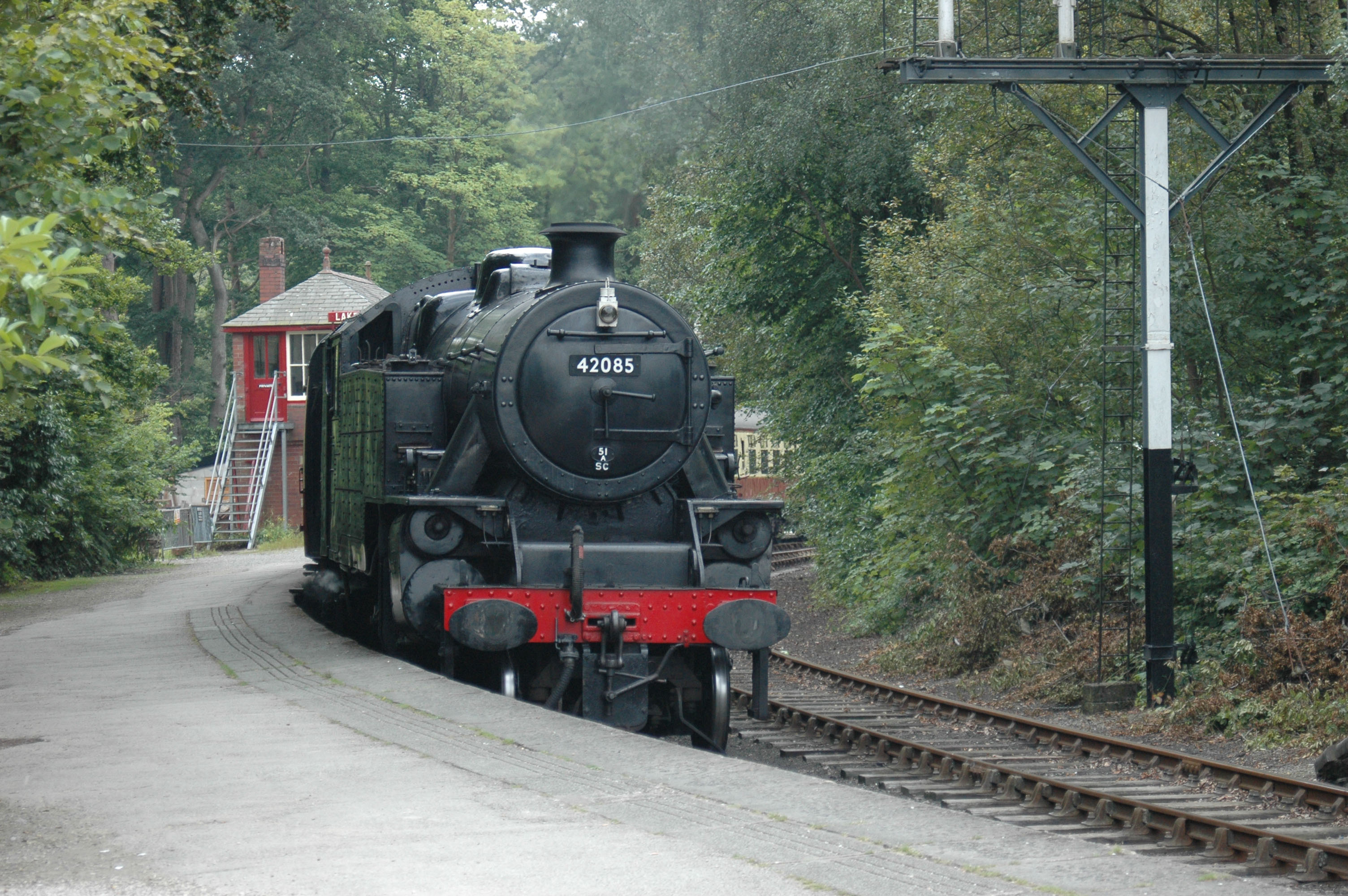
- Fairburn 2-6-4T 42085 at Lakeside station.

General information
- Location: Lakeside, Newby Bridge, Cumbria; England
- Coordinates: 54.2783°N 2.9555°W
- Grid reference: SD378873
- System: Station on heritage railway
- Operator: Lakeside and Haverthwaite Railway (L&HR)
- Platforms: Originally 3, now 2: 1 in use, 1 disused

History
- Original company: Furness Railway
- Pre-grouping: Furness Railway
- Post-grouping: London, Midland and Scottish Railway

Key dates
- 2 June 1869: Opened as Windermere Lake Side
- 31 August 1941: Closed
- 3 June 1946: Reopened in summers only
- 6 September 1965: Closed
- 2 May 1973: Reopened as Lakeside by L&HR
Location
- Location within the former South Lakeland district Location within Cumbria

Lakeside railway station is a stop on the heritage Lakeside and Haverthwaite Railway. It was previously the terminus of the Furness Railway's Ulverston-Lakeside Line, which was closed as part of the Beeching Axe in 1965. It serves the village of Lakeside in Cumbria, England, as well as the tourist attractions located there.

== History ==
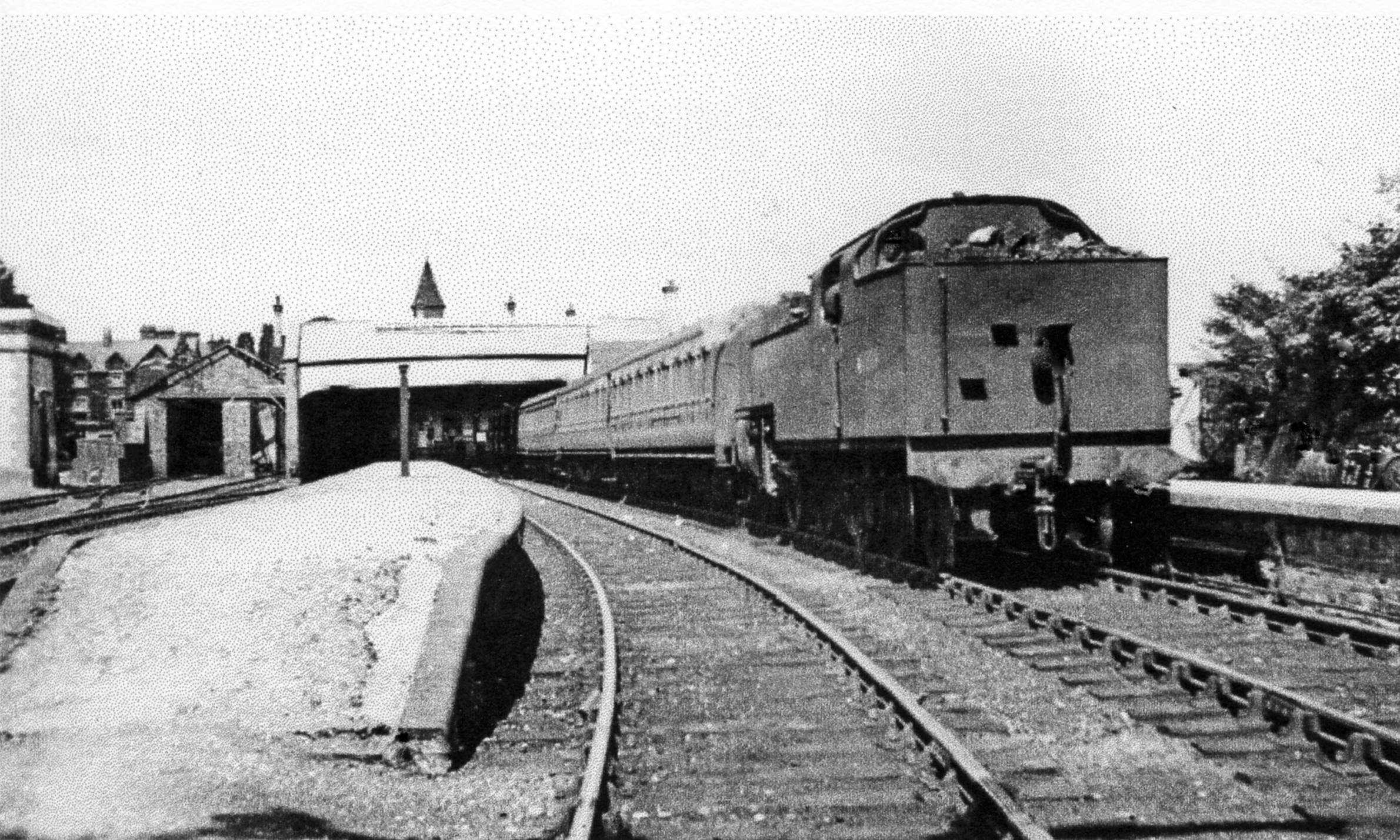
Lakeside station, 1951

The station was opened to passengers on 2 June 1869 by the Furness Railway, along with the branch from Plumpton Junction (just off the Leven Viaduct, on the Ulverston to Carnforth line) to Windermere Lake Side; a formal opening of the branch had taken place the day before.

Trains were timed to coincide with sailings by the Windermere United Yacht Company from the adjacent pier. Within a few years, the Furness Railway bought the yacht company.

Originally, the station had two platforms with an overall roof, a signal box, a turntable and several sidings. The goods yard was able to accommodate most types of goods including live stock and was equipped with a three-ton crane.

As well as the standard gauge tracks, the station had a narrow gauge tramway used for coaling lake steamers. A camping coach was positioned here by the London Midland Region from 1955 to 1957, and two coaches were here from 1958 to 1964.

The station closed with the line on 6 September 1965. After services stopped, the station fell into disrepair and, in 1978, British Rail removed the roof and demolished the clock tower.

British Rail sold off the steamboat service to the Bowness Bay Boating Company, who were still operating day trips on Windermere in 2020.

== Location ==
Situated at the southern end of Windermere, the station has a direct interchange with the Windermere Lake Cruises ferry services to Ambleside and Bowness-on-Windermere.

The station is also located next to the Aquarium of the Lakes and a number of shops and cafes.

== Services ==
The station reopened as part of the heritage Lakeside and Haverthwaite Railway in 1973. Trains run between Lakeside and Haverthwaite, via Newby Bridge, which is normally an eighteen minute journey.

| Preceding station | Heritage railways | Following station |
|---|---|---|
| Newby Bridge Halt towards Haverthwaite | Lakeside & Haverthwaite Railway | Terminus |
Disused railways
| Newby Bridge Halt; Line and station open | Furness Railway; Ulverston to Lakeside Branch Line | Terminus |

== Film locations ==
The station has appeared in a number of film and TV scenes. In many appearances, the station is titled Windermere, although the real Windermere railway station is on the other side of the lake, on a different line.

- Swallows and Amazons. Although released in 1974, this was filmed in 1973, the preservation society's first year of operation.
- 1980s TV Sherlock Holmes
- 1988 film Without A Clue, starring Ben Kingsley and Michael Caine
- 1996 TV production of Agatha Christie's Poirot; episode: "Dumb Witness"
