= Bib =

Bib, bib, BIB or BiB may refer to:

== Bib ==
=== Clothing ===
- Bib (garment), a piece of fabric or plastic that covers the wearer's chest
- Bib shorts, cycle clothing
- A scrimmage vest, sportswear used to differentiate players from one-another by colour
- Bib (snow), a pair of water proof overalls that are worn in the snow.

=== Other uses ===
- Bib (tribe), in the Hazara Division of Pakistan
- Bib Fortuna, a character in Star Wars
- Bib., an abbreviation of Bible
- bib., an abbreviation of bibliography
- .bib, the file extension of a BibTeX bibliographic file in TeX and LaTeX
- Competition numbers in sports, derived from the garment bib
- A nickname for Bibendum or the Michelin Man
- A freeze-resistant version of a spigot
- Trisopterus luscus, a species of fish

== Acronym ==
- Back in Black, an album by the group AC/DC
- Bag-in-box, a packaging method for wine, battery acid, and other fluids
- Biennial of Illustration Bratislava, an award for illustration in children's books
- Board for International Broadcasting, a former U.S. governmental organization
- Bottled in bond, a label for an American-produced distilled beverage that has been aged and bottled according to a set of legal regulations contained in the United States government's Standards of Identity for Distilled Spirits, as originally laid out in the Bottled-in-Bond Act of 1897
- Business is Business, a type of business war games
- Federal Institute for Population Research (German: Bundesinstitut für Bevölkerungsforschung) in Wiesbaden, Germany

== See also ==
- Bibb (disambiguation)
