= Lakeside, Cumbria =

Coordinates: 54.278°N 2.957°W

Lakeside
- Hamlet
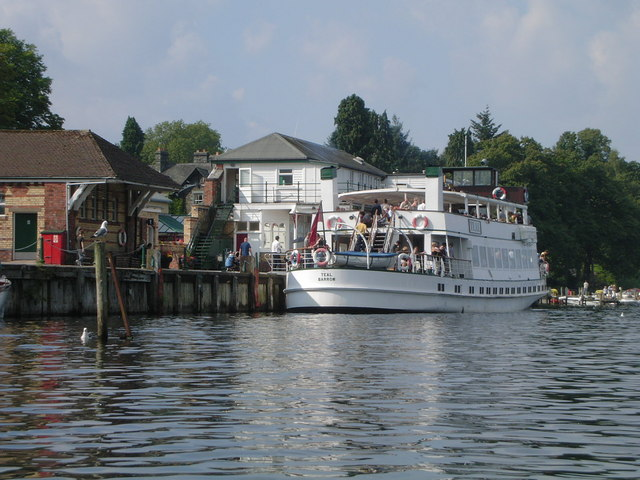
- The Teal at Lakeside

- Location in the former South Lakeland district Location within Cumbria
- OS grid reference: SD376873
- Civil parish: Colton
- Unitary authority: Westmorland and Furness
- Ceremonial county: Cumbria
- Region: North West
- Country: England
- Sovereign state: United Kingdom
- Post town: ULVERSTON
- Postcode district: LA12
- Dialling code: 015395
- Police: Cumbria
- Fire: Cumbria
- Ambulance: North West
- UK Parliament: Westmorland and Lonsdale

Lakeside is a Hamlet near Newby Bridge at the south end of Lake Windermere, England. Now in the county of Cumbria, before county reorganisation of 1974 it was in Lancashire, as part of the region known as Furness (although now it resides in the area of Westmorland). It was established as a steamer pier for services along the lake when the Lakeside branch of the Furness Railway reached it in 1869, meaning that steamer services no longer had to negotiate the River Leven to Newby Bridge. Also built at Lakeside was a hotel to serve the tourists brought by the railway and steamers.

The steamers still call at Lakeside and the railway is now a steam-hauled heritage railway, operated as the Lakeside & Haverthwaite Railway. However, it now only operates as far as Haverthwaite, with the route beyond to Ulverston closed in 1965 as part of the Beeching cuts.

It now contains the Aquarium of the Lakes, an aquarium featuring fish found in the rivers and seas around the Lake District.

In November 2009, the village including Lakeside Hotel and the Lakes Aquarium was partially flooded. The floods resulted in the closure of both businesses until early 2010 as well as the sinking of moored yachts and severe road blockages.

== See also ==
- Lakeside railway station
