= Newby Bridge Halt railway station =

Railway station in Cumbria, England

Newby Bridge Halt
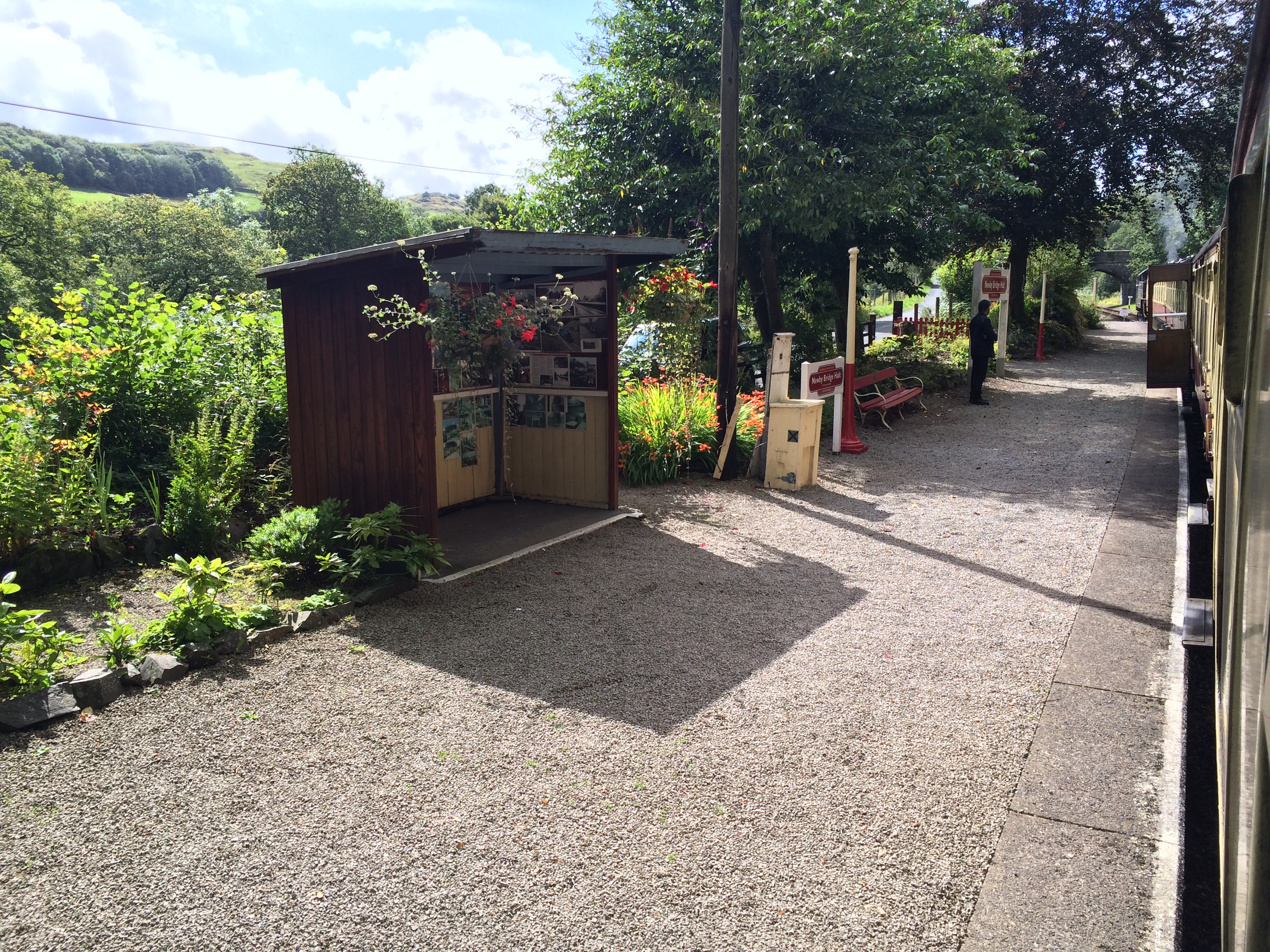
- Newby Bridge Halt, with a train standing at the platform.

General information
- Location: Newby Bridge, Cumbria; England
- Coordinates: 54.269°N 2.974°W
- Grid reference: SD366864
- System: Station on heritage railway
- Manager: Lakeside and Haverthwaite Railway
- Platforms: 1

Key dates
- 1905: opened
- 1949: closed
- 1973: re-opened
Location
- Location within the former South Lakeland district Location within Cumbria

Newby Bridge Halt (also known, historically, as Newby Bridge Platform) is a railway station on the Lakeside and Haverthwaite heritage railway. It serves the village of Newby Bridge, Cumbria, England.

== History ==
It was originally opened by the Furness Railway in 1905. Services were withdrawn in 1949, but trains continued to pass through the station until the line was closed by British Railways in 1965. Services were resumed eight years later under preservation.

== Facilities ==
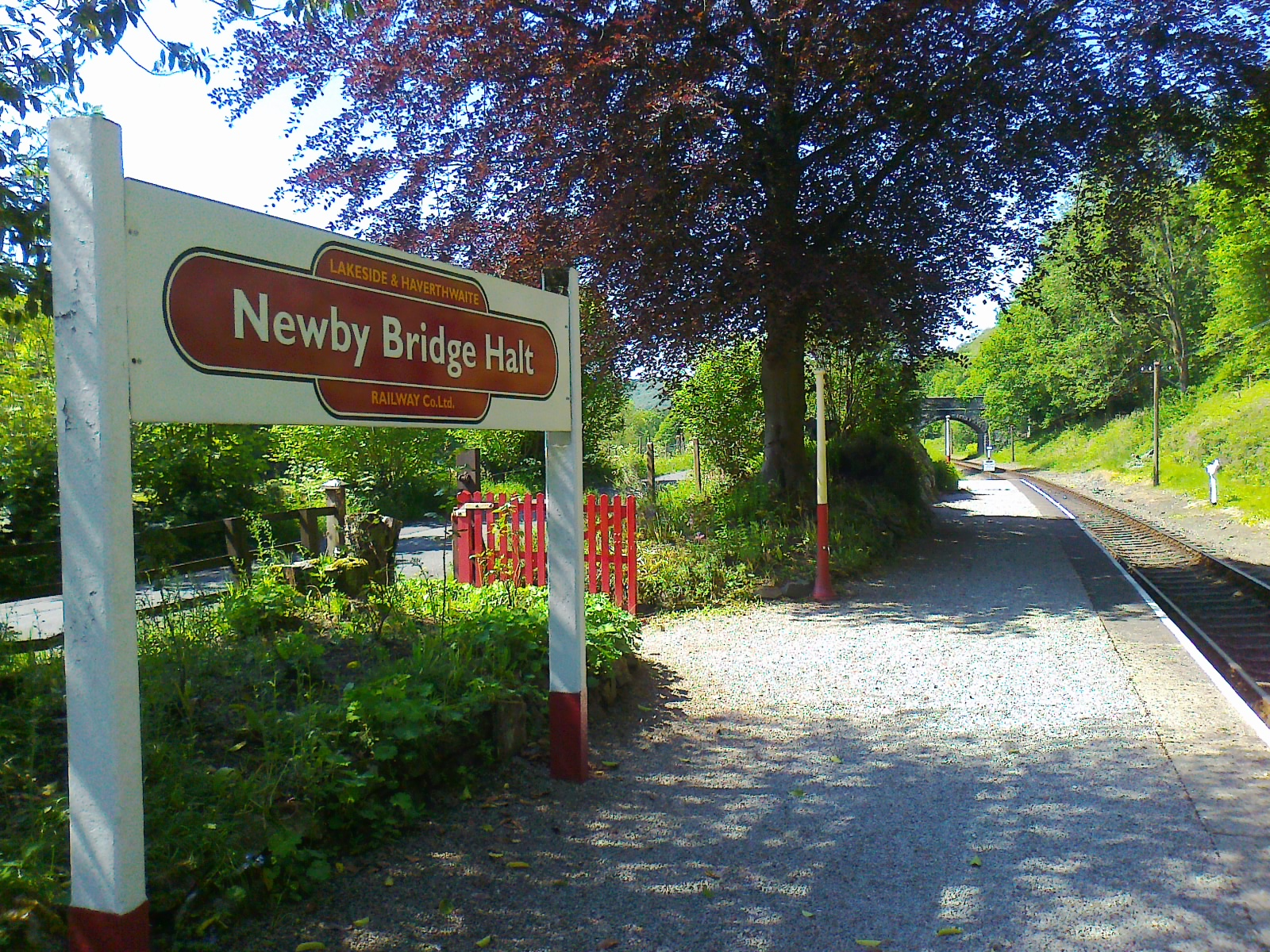
The modern platform and sign

The station is an un-staffed halt, with a small waiting shelter in which historical photographs of the halt are displayed, illustrating its condition both before and after reopening. There is seating inside the shelter as well as on the platform.

A commemorative tree was planted at the station by Bishop Eric Treacy, during the re-opening ceremony of the line in 1973. The sapling is now a fully grown tree. The gardens are maintained by a local volunteer and are at their best in Spring with the daffodils and tulips in full bloom.

Preceding station	Heritage railways	Following station
Haverthwaite Terminus	Lakeside & Haverthwaite Railway	Lakeside Terminus
Disused railways
Haverthwaite; Line and station open	Furness Railway; Ulverston to Lakeside Branch Line	Lakeside; Line and station open
