= Ulverston railway station =

Railway station in Cumbria, England

Ulverston
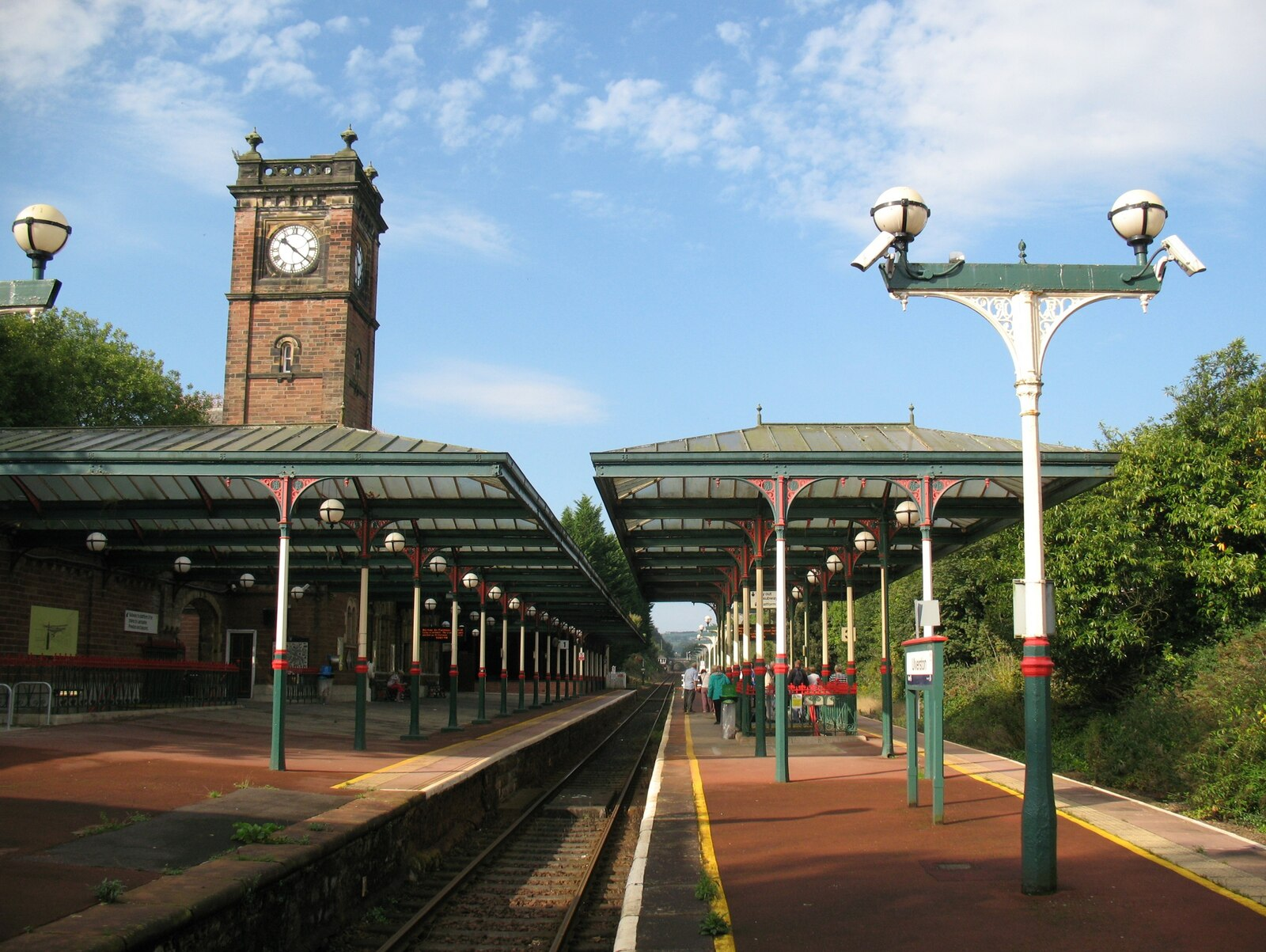

General information
- Location: Ulverston, Westmorland and Furness, England
- Coordinates: 54°11′30″N 3°05′53″W
- Grid reference: SD284778
- Owner: Network Rail
- Manager: Northern Trains
- Platforms: 2 (numbered 1 & 3)
- Tracks: 2

Other information
- Station code: ULV
- Classification: DfT category E

History
- Original company: Ulverstone and Lancaster Railway
- Pre-grouping: Furness Railway
- Post-grouping: London, Midland and Scottish Railway, London Midland Region of British Railways

Key dates
- 7 June 1854: First station opened
- 1 September 1857: Resited and present station opened as Ulverstone
- 1877: Renamed Ulverston

Passengers
- 2020/21: ▼90,684
- 2021/22: ▲0.268 million
- 2022/23: ▼0.257 million
- 2023/24: ▲0.267 million
- 2024/25: ▲0.290 million

Listed Building – Grade II
- Feature: Original Furness Railway station buildings
- Designated: 24 June 1974
- Reference no.: 1270170
Location
- Location within the former South Lakeland district Location within Cumbria
Notes
- Passenger statistics from the Office of Rail and Road

Ulverston is a railway station on the Furness Line, which runs between Barrow-in-Furness and Lancaster; it is situated 9 1/2 miles (15 km) north-east of Barrow-in-Furness. The station serves the market town of Ulverston, in Cumbria, England. It is owned by Network Rail and managed by Northern Trains.

== History ==
The Furness Railway's line from Barrow-in-Furness and Dalton was the first railway to serve the town, being completed on 7 June 1854. Three years later, the Ulverstone and Lancaster Railway opened the line southwards to Carnforth, via Arnside, and built a new through station on the current site; this opened on 1 September 1857, leaving the old FR terminus to be used as a goods depot. The Furness Railway then took over the Ulverstone and Lancaster company in 1862.

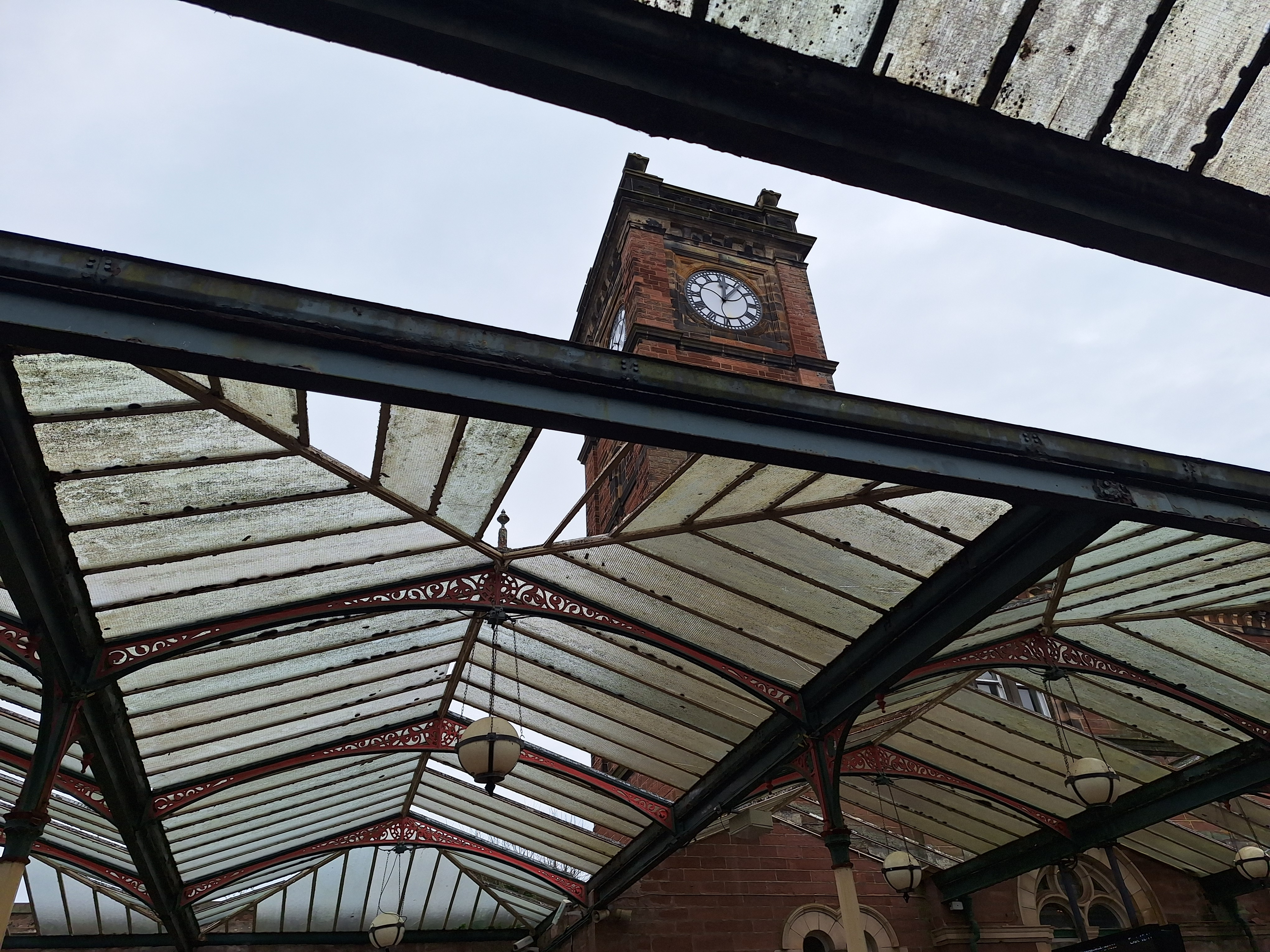
View up at the awnings of platform 1 and the clock tower from platform 3

The current buildings are architecturally noteworthy and date from 1873, when they were rebuilt as befitting one of the main stations of the Furness Railway. The clock tower, glass awnings and supporting decorative ironwork, which were extensively restored and repainted in 1990, are particularly fine. The passenger waiting room retains many period features.

The unusual platform layout, where the northbound line has a face on both sides, is a legacy of the station's former role as the interchange for the branch line to Lakeside. This diverged from the main line at Plumpton Junction, a few miles to the south, before heading north-eastwards through Greenodd and Haverthwaite; the branch reached its terminus at Lakeside on the southern shore of Windermere. The island platform allowed easy cross-platform interchange for those passengers travelling from the south changing onto the connecting service to Lakeside, whilst those wishing to exit the station could do so by alighting on the opposite side platform. Today, only platforms one and three are used.

The branch opened on 1 June 1869 and was well-patronised from the outset in the summer months by tourists, who could make a convenient transfer to the Windermere steamboats at Lakeside. The line was much quieter in winter though and year-round services ended in the autumn of 1938; passenger trains thereafter ran only during the summer. This continued until 6 September 1965, when the line fell victim to the Beeching Axe.

The line's northern end was reopened subsequently on 2 May 1973, as the Lakeside and Haverthwaite Railway. However, the remainder was lifted in the early 1970s and the trackbed used for improvements to the A590 road, over which passengers must continue their journey if heading to Lakeside today.

== Facilities ==
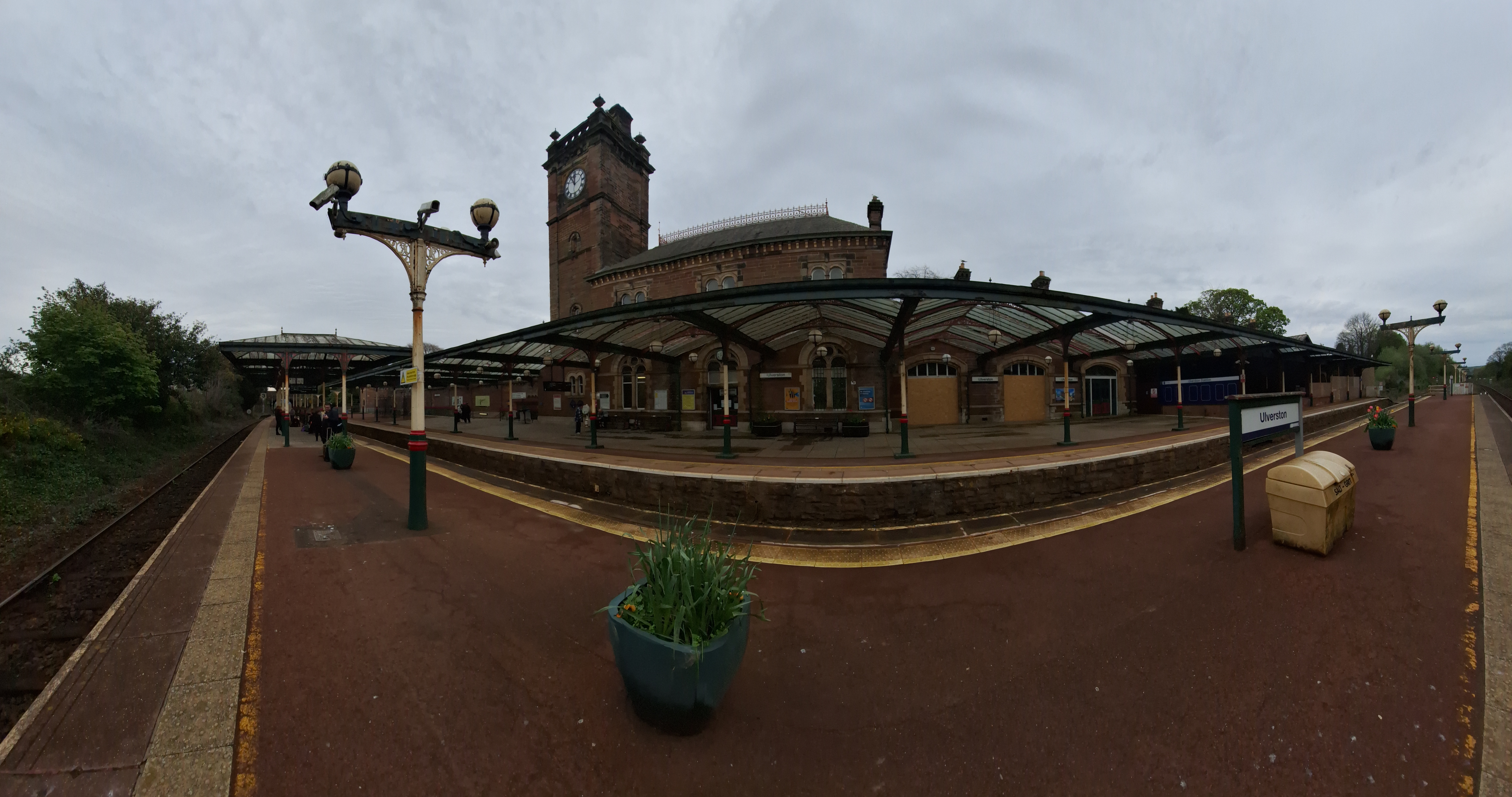
An approximately 180° panorama of the station from platform 3

The station is fully staffed throughout the week, except in the late evening; the booking office and waiting room are located in the main building on platform 1 and a ticket machine is also available.

In 2007, new digital information screens were installed allowing passengers to see the status and timing of their trains. Help points and an automated PA system are also provided. The platforms are linked by a subway, but there is no step-free access to either platform.

== Services ==
Northern Trains generally operates one train per hour in each direction to Barrow and to Lancaster on Monday to Saturday daytimes, with some additional peak period extras. A few through trains each day run beyond Barrow to Carlisle, via Whitehaven, and one to Millom; connections for Cumbrian Coast Line stations are available at Barrow at other times. Southbound, a number of services continue through to Preston and Manchester Airport, via Manchester Piccadilly.

A similar service operates on Sundays, with trains to Carlisle now running since the summer 2018 timetable change; the first time such trains have operated since 1976.

Preceding station	National Rail	Following station
Barrow-in-Furness	Northern Trains; Cumbria–Manchester Airport	Cark and Cartmel
Dalton	Northern Trains; Cumbria–Manchester Airport	Grange-over-Sands
Dalton	Northern Trains; Furness Line	Cark and Cartmel
	Historical railways	
Greenodd	Furness Railway; Ulverston to Lakeside Line	Terminus

== See also ==
- Listed buildings in Ulverston
