= Bib (tribe) =

The Bib are a Hindkowan tribe found in the Abbottabad District of the Khyber Pakhtunkhwa province of Pakistan. They occupy two villages between the Rash plains and Thandiani range.

The Bib claim to be a branch of the Awan tribe, a claim generally not accepted by the Awans. They, like the Awans, claim descent from Ali, the fourth Caliph of Islam. Their customs are similar to neighbouring Hindkowan communities, and they are entirely Sunni.

== See also ==
- Awan
