= Newby Bridge =

Hamlet in Cumbria, England

Coordinates: 54.2672°N 2.9688°W

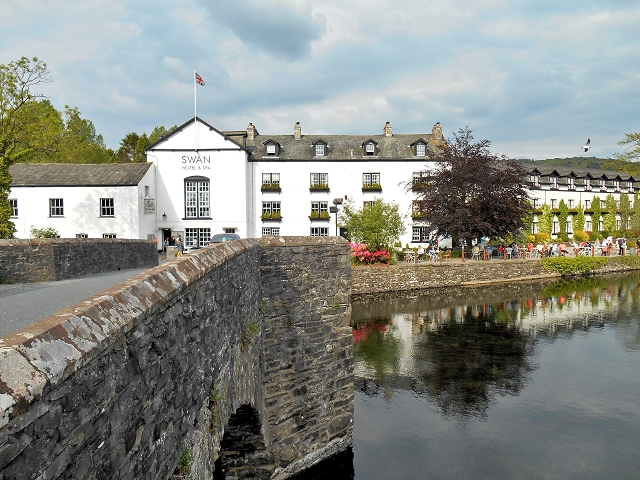
- Swan Hotel, Newby Bridge

- Location in South Lakeland Location within Cumbria
- OS grid reference: SD369861
- Civil parish: Staveley-in-Cartmel
- Unitary authority: Westmorland and Furness
- Ceremonial county: Cumbria
- Region: North West
- Country: England
- Sovereign state: United Kingdom
- Post town: ULVERSTON
- Postcode district: LA12
- Dialling code: 015395
- Police: Cumbria
- Fire: Cumbria
- Ambulance: North West
- UK Parliament: Westmorland and Lonsdale

Newby Bridge is a hamlet in the Lake District, Cumbria, England. Historically in Lancashire, it is located several miles west of Grange-over-Sands and is on the River Leven, close to the southern end of Windermere.

== History ==
The name derives from the bridge over the River Leven.

== Transport ==
=== Train ===
Newby Bridge railway station is an intermediate halt on the heritage Lakeside & Haverthwaite Railway between Lakeside and Haverthwaite. The line was once part of the Furness Railway from Ulverston; a terrace of houses adjoining the railway was built for its workers.

=== Bus ===
The area is served by the number 6 bus route and number X6 bus route, operated by Stagecoach Cumbria; this connects Newby Bridge with Barrow-in-Furness, Bowness-on-Windermere, Grange-over-Sands, Kendal and Ulverston.

=== Road ===
The A590 road runs through Newby Bridge, connecting Barrow-in-Furness to the M6 motorway close to Kendal.

== See also ==
- Listed buildings in Colton, Cumbria
- Listed buildings in Staveley-in-Cartmel
