= Lindal-in-Furness =

Coordinates: 54.171°N 3.149°W

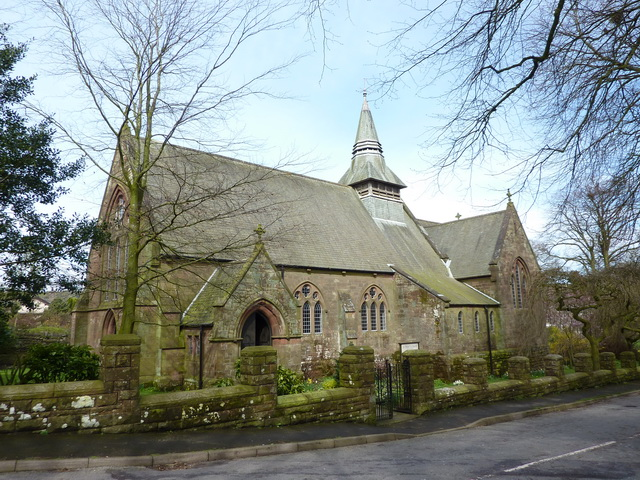
- St. Peter's Church, Lindal-in-Furness

- Location in Barrow-in-Furness Borough Location within Cumbria
- Population: 755 (2011 parish)
- OS grid reference: SD250756
- Civil parish: Lindal and Marton
- Unitary authority: Westmorland and Furness
- Ceremonial county: Cumbria
- Region: North West
- Country: England
- Sovereign state: United Kingdom
- Post town: ULVERSTON
- Postcode district: LA12
- Dialling code: 01229
- Police: Cumbria
- Fire: Cumbria
- Ambulance: North West
- UK Parliament: Barrow and Furness

Lindal-in-Furness is a village on the Furness peninsula, in the Westmorland and Furness district of Cumbria, England. Historically in Lancashire, it lies eight miles to the north-east of Barrow-in-Furness, on the A590 trunk road. The civil parish is Lindal and Marton which had a population of 755 at the 2011 Census, and includes the village of Marton.

The land around Lindal, a small grange belonging to Furness Abbey in the Middle Ages, had long been known for its iron ore. In the 1840s and 1850s, larger deposits were discovered in the area and Lindal became one of many mining villages supplying the iron ore for what was then one of the world's largest steelworks, in Barrow.

Lindal was originally built around a tarn, which was later filled in with spoil from the mines to create a village green. The iron mining companies built houses, chapels, reading rooms, a public hall and a school in Lindal during the period from the mid-19th century to early 20th century.

The iron ore production declined in face of increased international competition and dwindling resources. The last mine in Lindal closed in 1960. Since then, Lindal has developed as a commuter village for the nearby towns of Barrow-in-Furness, Dalton-in-Furness and Ulverston.

Lindal and the adjacent village of Marton share a common Parish Council, Residents' Association, church and village hall. Lindal and Marton Primary School (LAMPS) celebrated its 150th anniversary in 2004.

== Sport ==
Lindal Moor Cricket Club play in the North Lancashire and Cumbria League.

== See also ==
- Listed buildings in Lindal and Marton
- Lindal Railway Incident
