= Lakeside and Haverthwaite Railway =

Heritage railway in Cumbria, England

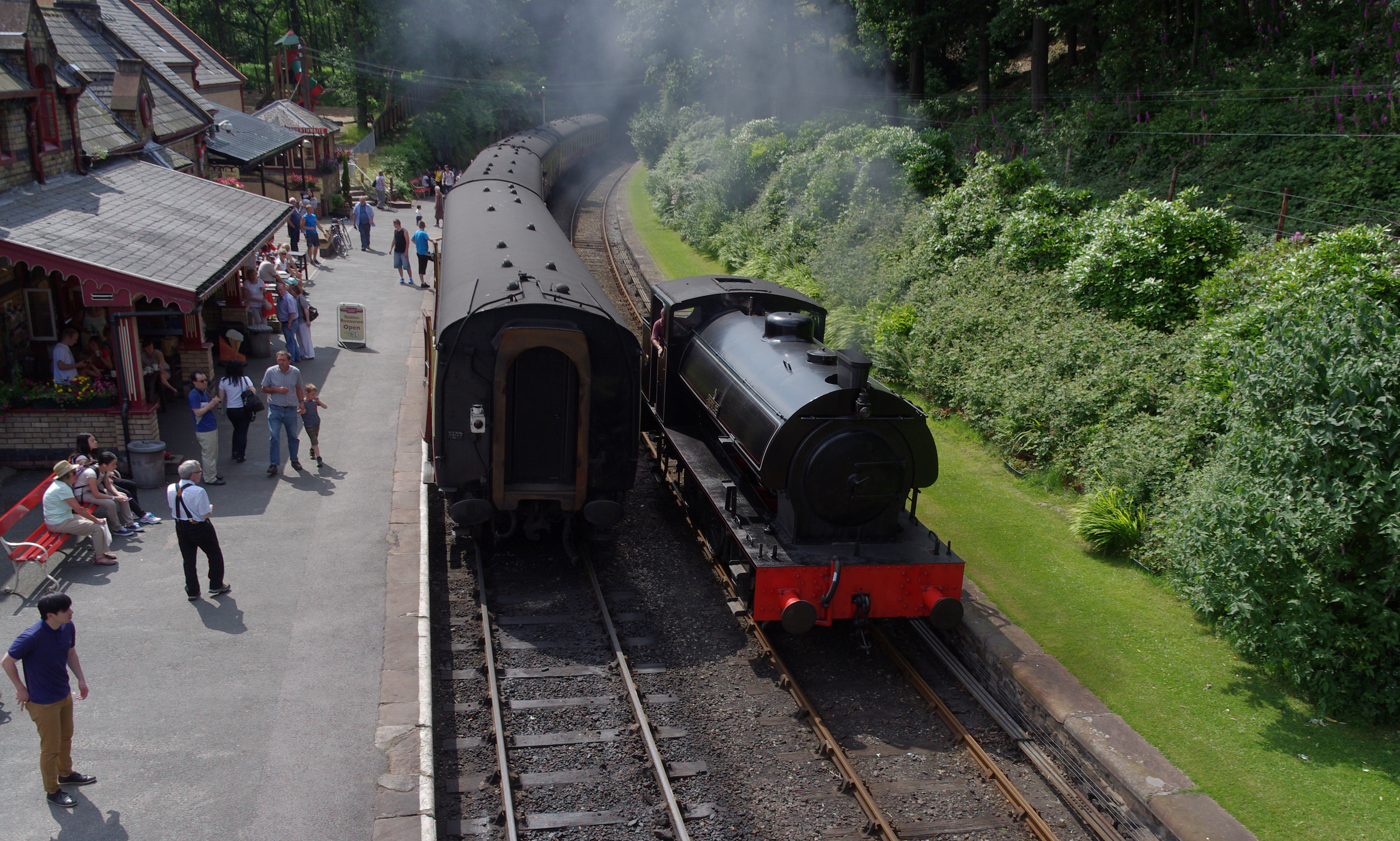
- Locale: Cumbria, England
- Terminus: Lakeside

Commercial operations
- Name: Ulverston to Lakeside Line
- Built by: Furness Railway
- Original gauge: 4 ft 8 1/2 in (1,435 mm) standard gauge

Preserved operations
- Operated by: Lakeside and Haverthwaite Railway
- Stations: 3
- Length: 3.2 mi (5.1 km)
- Preserved gauge: 4 ft 8 1/2 in (1,435 mm) standard gauge

Commercial history
- Opened: 1 June 1869
- Closed: 6 September 1965

Preservation history
- Opened: 2 May 1973
- Headquarters: Haverthwaite

The Lakeside and Haverthwaite Railway (L&HR) is a 3.2-mile-long (5.1 km) heritage railway in Cumbria, England.

== History ==
=== Furness Railway operation of the branch line ===
The railway is a former branch line of the Furness Railway (FR) and was opened on 1 June 1869. The line was served by local passenger trains which started their journey at Ulverston on the FR's main line from Carnforth to Barrow-in-Furness.

The FR branch trains travelled east to the triangular junction at Plumpton, then turned north via Greenodd and on to stations at Haverthwaite, Newby Bridge halt and Lakeside. The FR's weekdays passenger service in July 1922 comprised eight trains in each direction. There were advertised train-to-boat connections that were established in 1869. During the summer season, excursion trains from Lancashire and elsewhere used the east-to-north side of Plumpton Junction to reach Lakeside, where their passengers joined the boat sailings on the lake.

=== Closure of the branch and reopening by L&HR ===
British Railways closed the line to passengers on 6 September 1965, and to all traffic two years later.

A group of enthusiasts, chaired by Dr Peter Beet, formed the Lakeside Railway Estates Company; they had the idea of preserving both the line and the former LMS 10A locomotive shed at Carnforth, to provide a complete steam operating system. However, although backed by then transport minister Barbara Castle, the need to build a number of motorway bridges and rerouting of the A590 road from Haverthwaite via Greenodd to Plumpton Junction, meant that the complete vision was unsuccessful. Beet acquired 10A in partnership with Sir William McAlpine, 6th Baronet, which became the visitor attraction Steamtown from 1967. The venture folded as a public access visitor attraction in 1997, but the preserved site was taken over by businessman David Smith to become the base for his West Coast Railway Company.

As a result, Austin Maher became chairman of the LREC, which then reopened the truncated 3.5-mile (5.6 km) L&HR as a heritage railway on 2 May 1973. Maher and fellow L&HR director Jim Morris each bought one LMS 2-6-4T Class 4MT, nos. 42073 (Maher) and 42085 (Morris), which were restored eventually as L&HR nos. 3 and 4, became the line's core steam power units.

== Location ==
The L&HR runs from Haverthwaite, at the southern end of the line, via Newby Bridge to Lakeside at the southern end of Windermere. Some services are timed to connect with sailings of the diesel excursion vessels or steam vessels on Windermere, sailing from Lakeside to Bowness and Ambleside.

== Stations ==
Point	Coordinates (Links to map resources)	OS Grid Ref	Notes
Lakeside	54.2783°N 2.9555°W	SD378873	
Newby Bridge Halt	54.2696°N 2.9740°W	SD366864	
Haverthwaite	54.2497°N 2.9998°W	SD349842	

== Locomotives ==
=== Steam locomotives ===
==== Steam locomotives currently at the railway ====
Information below derived from the Lakeside and Haverthwaite Railway Visitors Guide sixth edition and the IRS reference book.

===== Operational =====
Number	Name	Built	Builder	Type	Former Operator	Notes	Image
2333	David	1953	Barclay	0-4-0ST	Millom Ironworks	Boiler ticket expires in 2029; painted in maroon lined out in black and yellow	
2682	Princess	1942	Bagnall	0-6-0ST	Preston Docks	Boiler ticket expires in 2029; painted in dark blue lined out in black and red	
3698	Repulse	1950	Hunslet	0-6-0ST, Austerity Tank	National Coal Board	Boiler ticket expires in 2026; painted in lined black	
42073		1950	British Railways, Brighton works to an LMS design	2-6-4T, Class 4MT	British Railways	Returned to service in 2014; painted BR black with late crest	

===== Inactive =====
Number	Name	Built	Builder	Type	Former Operator	Notes	Image
2996	Victor	1951	Bagnall	0-6-0ST, New Standard 18	Steel Company of Wales for Port Talbot Steelworks, Austin Motor Company	Boiler ticket expired in 2024; painted in maroon lined out in black and yellow	
42085		1951	British Railways, Brighton works to an LMS design	2-6-4T, Class 4MT	British Railways	Undergoing overhaul; painted BR black with early emblem	
46441		1951	British Railways, Crewe works to an LMS design	2-6-0, Class 2MT	British Railways	Running In, Boiler ticket expires in 2033. Painted BR maroon with late crest. 46441 began its running in testing in November 2023 and is intended to return to revenue service in 2024.	

==== Steam locomotives formerly at the railway ====
The list of locomotives below contains those currently identified as having been resident at Haverthwaite in the past. It is, in all probability, not an exhaustive list.

Number	Name	Built	Builder	Type	Former Operator	Notes	Image
1 (works Nº 1925)	Caliban	1937	Peckett	0-4-0ST, OY class	Courtaulds, Preston	At the Ribble Steam Railway in Preston	
5 (works Nº 1631)		1929	Hudswell Clarke	0-6-0ST	Stewarts & Lloyds	Acquired November 1970; now at Tyseley	
6 (works no. 1366)		1919	Hudswell Clarke	0-6-0ST	Renishaw Ironworks no. 6	Acquired November 1970; now at the Aln Valley Railway after having spent many years at the Tanfield Railway	
20		1863	Sharp Stewart	0-4-0, FR class 17, Rush class A5	Furness Railway, Barrow Steelworks	Built as an 0-4-0; rebuilt for Barrow Steelworks as an 0-4-0ST, running as Nº 7; rebuilt in preservation to original configuration. Owned by the Furness Railway Trust and operational at the Ribble Steam Railway in Preston	
1550	Sir James	1917	Barclay	0-6-0F	War Department, Gretna	On static display at HM Factory, Gretna	
1900		1936	Peckett	0-4-0T	Courtaulds, Holywell	Operated during the summer of 1983; now at the Buckinghamshire Railway Centre	
3794	Cumbria	1953	Hunslet	0-6-0ST, Austerity Tank	Ministry of Defence	Owned by the Furness Railway Trust and normally operational at the Ribble Steam Railway in Preston, but currently operating at the Embsay and Bolton Abbey Steam Railway; boiler ticket expires in May 2025; painted in FR red	
5643		1925	GWR, Swindon Works	0-6-2T	GWR, British Railways	Owned by the Furness Railway Trust and normally operational at the Ribble Steam Railway in Preston but currently undergoing extended maintenance at the East Lancashire Railway in Bury	
44806	Magpie	1944	LMS, Derby Works	4-6-0, Black 5	LMS, British Railways	Acquired November 1970; moved to Steamport Southport; now at North Yorkshire Moors Railway with plans to return to the mainline	

=== Diesel ===
==== Diesel locomotives currently at the railway ====
Information below derived from the Lakeside and Haverthwaite Railway Visitors Guide sixth edition and the IRS reference book.

===== Operational =====
Number	Name	Built	Builder	Type	Former Operator	Notes	Image
8		1959	British Railways, Swindon Works	0-6-0DM Class 03	British Railways as D2117	Operational	
AD601		1945	LMS, Derby Works	0-6-0DE Class 11	War Department	Operational. One of a batch of locomotives built for the War Department, the design of which led to the class of locomotives that eventually became BR Class 11.	
D2072		1959	British Railways, Doncaster Works	0-6-0DM Class 03	British Railways as TOPS 03 072	Operational	
20 214	Austin Maher	1967	English Electric	Bo-Bo Class 20	British Railways	Operational	
52071+52077		1961	Birmingham Railway Carriage & Wagon Company	Class 110 DMU	British Railways	Operational	

===== Inactive =====
Number	Name	Built	Builder	Type	Former Operator	Notes
2098	Rachel	1924	Motor Rail & Tram Car Co.	0-4-0	Burneside Paper Mills Tramway	On display, undergoing restoration

===== Self-powered diesel crane =====
Not a locomotive in the traditional sense but is capable of, and has been used for, limited shunting operations.

Number	Name	Built	Builder	Type	Former Operator	Notes
20		1952	Jones	0-4-0 KL100 crane		Operational

==== Diesel locomotives formerly at the railway ====
The list of locomotives below contains those currently identified as having been resident at Haverthwaite in the past. It is, in all probability, not an exhaustive list.

Number	Name	Built	Builder	Type	Former Operator	Notes
2 (works Nº 21999)	Fluff	1937	Fowler	0-4-0DM	Barrow Steelworks	The first locomotive purchased by, and still owned by, the Furness Railway Trust. Currently at the Ribble Steam Railway in Preston after having spent time on display at Locomotion at Shildon, County Durham
D5301		1958	Birmingham Railway Carriage & Wagon Company	Bo-Bo Class 26	British Railways as TOPS 26 001	Now at the Caledonian Railway, Brechin, Angus, Scotland
D5370		1962	Birmingham Railway Carriage & Wagon Company	Bo-Bo Class 27	British Railways as TOPS 27 024	Now at the Caledonian Railway, Brechin, Angus, Scotland

== Rolling stock ==
=== Coaches ===
Information below derived from the Lakeside and Haverthwaite Railway Visitors Guide sixth edition.

Number	Built	Builder	Type	Notes	Image
3881	1953	BR York Works	Mk. 1 TSO (Tourist Standard Open)	Crimson and cream livery	
3962	1954	BR Eastleigh Works	Mk. 1 TSO	Crimson and cream livery	
4255	1956	BR York Works	Mk. 1 TSO	Crimson and cream livery	
4410	1957	BR Swindon Works	Mk. 1 TSO	Crimson and cream livery	
4760	1957	BR York works	Mk. 1 TSO	Crimson and cream livery	
9218	1953	BR Doncaster Works	Mk. 1 BSO (Brake Standard Open)	Crimson and cream livery	
25337	1957	BR Wolverton Works	Mk. 1 SK (Standard Corridor)	Crimson and cream livery	
25364	1957	BR Wolverton Works	Mk. 1 SK	Crimson and cream livery	
35309	1962	BR Wolverton Works	Mk. 1 BSK (Brake Standard Corridor)	Crimson and cream livery	
35362	1962	BR Wolverton Works	Mk. 1 BSK	Crimson and cream livery	

=== Wagons ===
There are a selection of assorted goods vehicles.

== In fiction ==
In Christopher Awdry's book Thomas & Victoria, the Lakeside & Haverthwaite Railway is featured as part of the railway route where Victoria worked along both Helena and Albert before coming to Sodor. In the Thomas the Tank Engine TV series, the railway was filmed for a series of short educational segments entitled Down at the Station.

In the adaptation of Agatha Christie's novel, Dumb Witness, by ITV for its television series, Agatha Christie's Poirot, the opening scene was filmed at the Lakeside & Haverthwaite Railway, at the Lakeside terminus.

The railway and Haverthwaite station are featured in the video to Never Went to Church by alternative hip hop band The Streets.
