= Haverthwaite railway station =

Heritage railway station in Cumbria, England

Haverthwaite
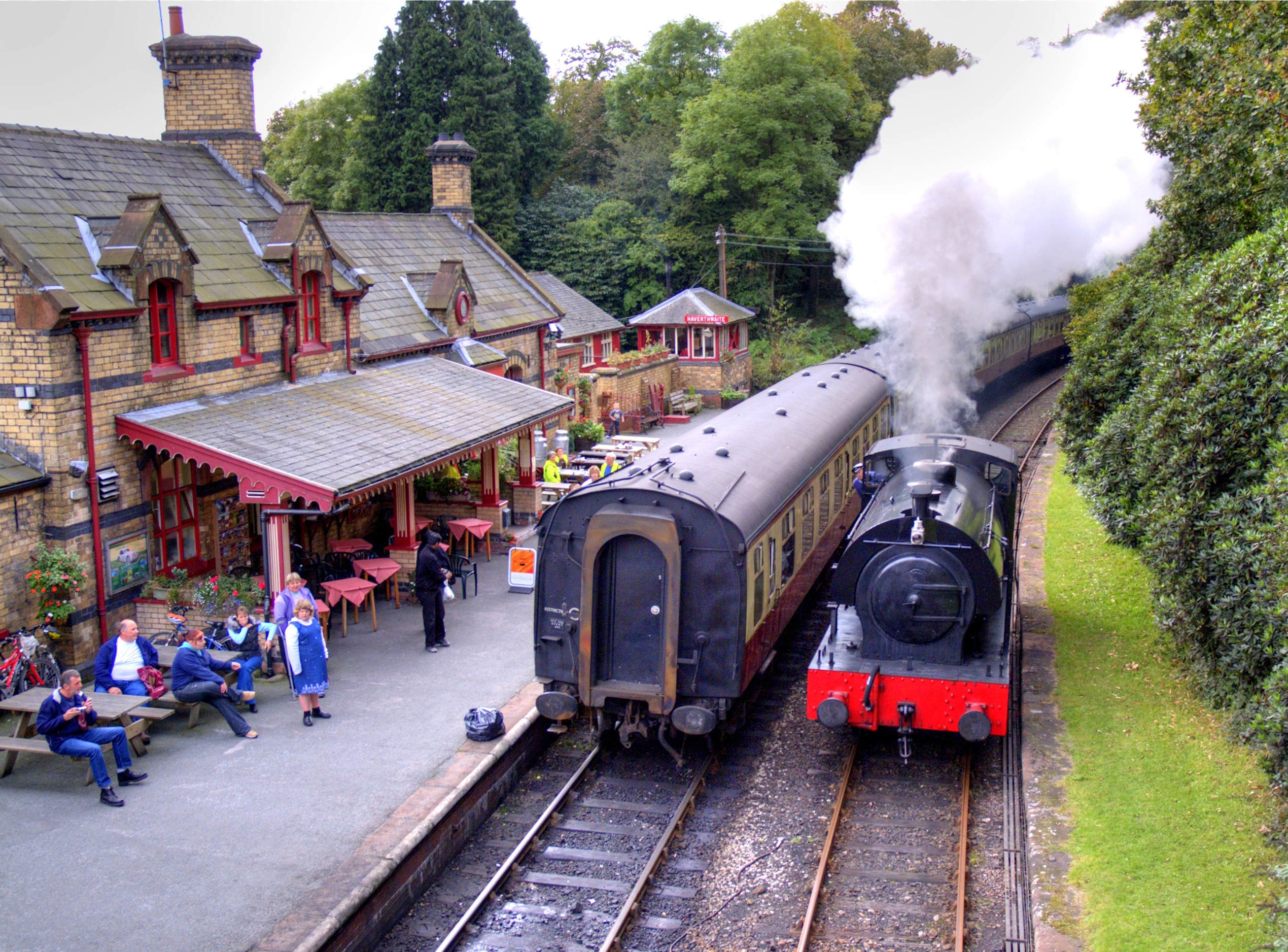
- Haverthwaite station.

General information
- Location: Haverthwaite, Cumbria; England
- Coordinates: 54.249°N 2.999°W
- Grid reference: SD349842
- System: Station on heritage railway
- Manager: Lakeside and Haverthwaite Railway
- Platforms: 2 (1 in use, 1 disused)
Location
- Location within the former South Lakeland district Location within Cumbria

Haverthwaite railway station is the western terminus of the preserved Lakeside and Haverthwaite Railway; it serves the village of Haverthwaite, in Cumbria, England.

== History ==
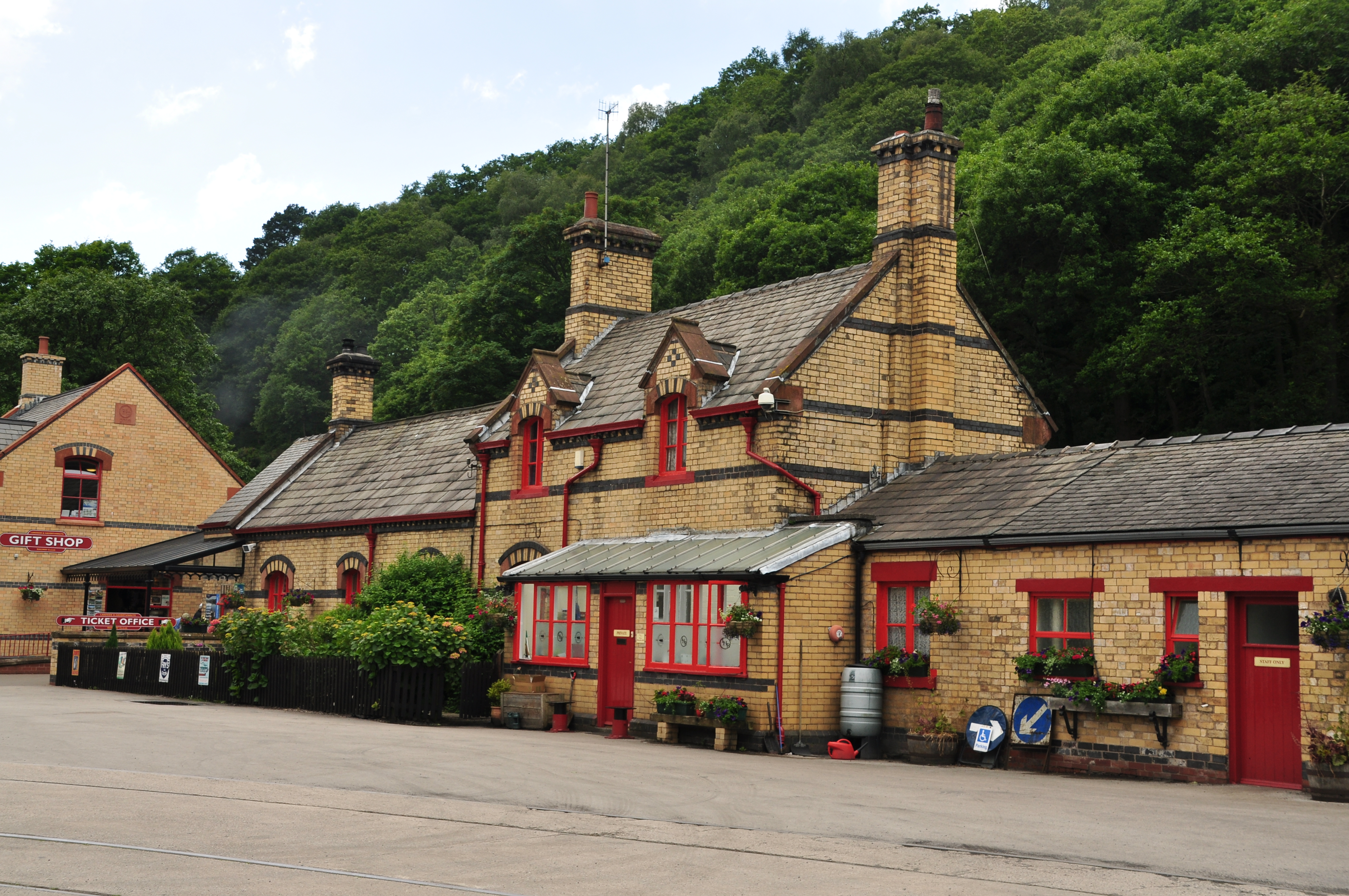
The station in 2014

The station opened on 1 June 1869, with sidings and a goods shed.

A long siding once served the iron works blast furnace of Backbarrow. Until 1935, gunpowder from Low Wood was brought to the main line by a horse-worked narrow gauge tramway.

Passenger services were withdrawn from the station from 30 September 1946, but it was not officially closed until 13 June 1955. Passenger trains continued to pass through the station in summer only until 1965.

== Services ==
Heritage services were resumed eight years later, in 1973, under preservation to Lakeside, via Newby Bridge.

Preceding station	Heritage railways	Following station
Terminus	Lakeside & Haverthwaite Railway	Newby Bridge Halt towards Lakeside
Disused railways
Greenodd; Line and station closed	Furness Railway; Ulverston to Lakeside Branch Line	Newby Bridge Halt; Line and station open

== The station today ==
The station has a main building which houses a booking hall and waiting room. There is also a toilet block and plenty of outside seating. It has a footbridge and a second platform, however these are not currently in use.

Haverthwaite also is the location of the railway's engine sheds and workshops.
