= Listed buildings in Colton, Cumbria =

Colton is a civil parish in the Westmorland and Furness district of Cumbria, England. It contains 44 listed buildings that are recorded in the National Heritage List for England. Of these, three are listed at Grade II*, the middle of the three grades, and the others are at Grade II, the lowest grade. The parish is in the Lake District National Park and is located between Windermere and Coniston Water. It is mainly rural, and the villages and settlements include Colton, Colthouse, Finsthwaite, Lakeside, Oxen Park, Nibthwaite, Bouth, Rusland, Newby Bridge, and Greenodd. Many of the listed buildings are houses and associated structures, farmhouses and farm buildings. The other listed buildings include churches and structures in or near the churchyard, bridges, a potash kiln, a former bobbin mill, three milestones, two memorials, and a hotel.

== Key ==
| Grade | Criteria |
|---|---|
| II* | Particularly important buildings of more than special interest |
| II | Buildings of national importance and special interest |

== Buildings ==
| Name and location | Photograph | Date | Notes | Grade |
|---|---|---|---|---|
| Water basin 54.26586°N 3.04904°W | — | 16th century or earlier (probable) | The water basin is in a field to the west of Holy Trinity Church. It is in stone and has a round retaining wall with an inlet to the south. The basin probably originated as a holy well. | II |
| Potash kiln 54.31110°N 2.98648°W | — | 16th century or earlier | The potash kiln is a round stone structure built into a slope in the ground. It has an entrance to a tunnel with a sloping roof. The top is overgrown and is partly collapsed. | II |
| Low Longmire Farm and outbuildings 54.27642°N 3.03429°W | — | 16th century or earlier | The oldest part is the farmhouse, the other buildings being added in later centuries. The buildings are in slate and stone with slate roofs. The farmhouse has two storeys and attics, three bays, and a lean-to on the left. The windows are a mix of casements and sashes. The farm buildings consist of a two-storey bank barn dated 1735 with a T-shaped plan, a hayloft in two builds, a calf hull, an earth closet, a pigsty, and a water mill. | II |
| Holy Trinity Church; 54.26554°N 3.04797°W | | 1578 | The tower was added in the early 17th century, the transept in 1721, the vestry in 1762, and the church was restored in 1890. It is built in roughcast stone with ashlar dressings and a slate roof. The church consists of a nave and chancel in a single cell, a north transept, a north vestry, and a west tower with an embattled parapet. | II |
| Underfield; 54.24801°N 3.04731°W | — | 1649 | This consists of two houses with outbuildings between, and extensions were added in about 1800 and in the 1920s. The buildings are in roughcast stone with slate roofs and two storeys. The older house has three bays with a single-bay extension to the left and the outbuildings to the right, and the later house has six bays. The older house has casement windows in the ground floor, mullioned windows in the upper floor, a fire window, a doorway with a decorated and dated lintel, and a hood mould. The outbuildings have an entrance and loading doors. Most of the windows in the later house are sashes, there are some casement windows, and a doorway with a flat canopy on shaped brackets. | II |
| Nibthwaite Grange; 54.28407°N 3.08276°W | — | 17th century (probable) | Originally a grange of Furness Abbey, and later a private house, it is roughcast with limestone dressings and a slate roof. There are two storeys and a garden front of five bays; the right two bays are recessed, lower, and gabled, and the left three bays have a hipped roof. The central bay projects forwards under a pediment, and the doorway has an architrave and a fanlight. The windows are sashes in architraves. At the rear are four irregular bays, a tall stair window, and a doorway with a flat canopy. | II |
| Water Side House; 54.26895°N 2.97711°W | — | 1650–60 (probable) | The house was extended in 1675, it is in roughcast stone with a slate roof. There are three storeys and five bays, a former single-storey single-bay outbuilding to the left, and a stair wing at the rear. Most of the windows are sashes, and others are casements, fixed, or mullioned. | II |
| Glen View and Old Smithy; 54.27602°N 3.04809°W | — | 1697 | A house with an attached former smithy to the right, in stone with slate roofs and two storeys. The house is roughcast with two bays, and a gabled extension at the rear. There is one fixed window, three sash windows, and a gabled porch. The former smithy has a sliding door and a small window in the ground floor, double loading doors above, and a datestone carved with initials and trade tools. | II |
| Abbot Park Farmhouse; 54.28382°N 3.05690°W | — | Late 17th or 18th century | The farmhouse is in roughcast stone with a slate roof, two storeys, three bays, a rear gabled wing, and a lean-to extension. In the ground floor are casement windows and a fire window, and in the upper floor the windows are fixed with opening lights. Above the plain entrance is a dripstone. | II |
| Cobby House; 54.27508°N 2.98310°W | — | 17th or early 18th century | A stone house with a slate roof, two storeys and four bays, the right bay, which was converted from a barn, projecting under a gable. Most of the windows are 20th-century small-paned casements, and there are two fixed windows with opening lights, and a French window. | II |
| Crossland House with outbuilding 54.29717°N 3.00903°W | — | 17th or early 18th century | The house and outbuilding are in stone, partly roughcast, with a slate roof. The house has two storeys and two bays, and the outbuilding to the left, now incorporated into the house, has one storey with an attic, two bays, and a rear outshut. Most of the windows are sashes, on the front is a gabled trellis porch, and there is a doorway with a slate gabled hood. | II |
| Ferndale Cottage and Rose Cottage; 54.28301°N 2.97212°W | — | Late 17th or 18th century | A pair of roughcast stone houses with a slate roof and two storeys. Ferndale Cottage has two bays, and Rose Cottage has three bays, a rear wing and a stair wing. The windows are mullioned, and Rose Cottage has a gabled timber porch. | II |
| Finsthwaite House; 54.27615°N 2.97846°W | | Late 17th or early 18th century | The house was altered later in the 18th century, and the front dates from about 1790. The house is in stone with a slate roof, quoins, a top cornice, a parapet, two storeys and a front of five bays, the middle bay projecting forwards. The windows are sashes, the middle window in the upper floor having a frieze and a cornice on consoles. At the entrance is a porch with paired Doric columns, and a round-headed recess with angle pilasters. The doorway has panelled pilasters, and an elliptical shell fanlight. At the rear is a two-storey canted bay window, and an extension with a bell turret. | II |
| Jolliver Tree Cottage; 54.27975°N 2.97731°W | — | 17th or early 18th century (probable) | A roughcast stone house with a slate roof, two storeys, three bays, and a rear gabled wing and outshut. The windows on the front are sashes, and at the rear is a fixed window with opening lights. | II |
| Jolliver Tree Farmhouse; 54.27985°N 2.97720°W | — | Late 17th or early 18th century | The farmhouse is in roughcast stone with a slate roof, two storeys with attics, three bays, and two outhouses. Most of the windows are casements, and there are some sash windows and a French window. In the gabled east front is an entrance, and there are hood moulds above two of the windows. | II |
| Low Parkamoor and outbuilding 54.32460°N 3.06705°W | | 17th or early 18th century (probable) | The building is in stone, partly roughcast, with a slate roof. The house has two storeys, three bays, and a rear stair wing. The windows are fixed with opening lights and timber lintels, and above the ground floor windows is a hood mould. The entrance has a slate gabled hood. In the outbuilding is a blocked entrance, a window and a pitching hole. | II |
| Steenkot and The Old Cottage; 54.27589°N 3.04800°W | — | Late 17th or 18th century | Two houses in roughcast stone with slate roofs, two storeys and four bays. There is one sash window, the other windows being fixed with opening lights. The two entrances have open slate slab porches, and in the right return is a round projection. | II |
| Tom Crag; 54.27468°N 2.98308°W | — | Late 17th or 18th century | A stone house with a slate roof, two storeys, six bays, a single-storey outhouse to the left, and a rear wing converted from a barn. The windows are 20th-century small-paned casements with slate lintels. On the front is a lean-to porch containing a two-light mullioned window. | II |
| High Stott Park House and Cottage; 54.28897°N 2.96544°W | | 1712 | Two houses at right angles, forming an L-shaped plan, in roughcast stone, with slate roofs and two storeys. The cottage faces east and has three bays, a single-bay extension to the south, with fixed windows in the original part, and sash windows in the extension. The entrance has a trellis porch and a datestone above, and in the extension is a recessed porch. The house faces south, with three bays, sash windows, a recessed porch, a balcony, and decorated bargeboards. | II |
| Rook How Friends' Meeting House and cottage 54.29704°N 3.02757°W | — | 1725 | The Friends' meeting house and attached house are in roughcast stone with slate roofs. There are five bays, the first two bays have a single storey and the others have two storeys. The third bay projects as a two-storey gabled porch. Most of the windows are mullioned, some have sashes, and at the rear are casement windows. The entrance has a segmental head. | II* |
| Stable, Rook How Meeting House; 54.29718°N 3.02716°W | — | c. 1725 | The former stable is in stone with a slate roof. It contains barn doors, a former entrance with a timber lintel, and an inserted window. | II |
| Rusland Hall; 54.29057°N 3.01621°W | | Early 18th century | A house that was extended in about 1850, it is in stuccoed stone with slate roofs. There are three storeys, five bays, and flanking two-storey two-bay wings receding to the rear. The front has quoins, a top cornice, and a parapet. In the centre is a Doric porch with a frieze, and the windows are sashes in architraves. The wings have hipped roofs, and the right wing contains a clock face. At the rear is a stair projection with a round-headed window. | II |
| Nibthwaite Mill; 54.28540°N 3.08504°W | — | 1735 | Originally a bobbin mill, later converted into a house, the oldest part is the furnace, the rest of the building dating from about 1840. It is built in stone with slate roofs, and has two storeys, a basement, six bays, and a gabled wing to the east. The windows are 20th-century small-paned casements with slate lintels. In the north gable is a gabled porch, and there is a segmental-headed entrance in the basement. The building and associated structures are a Scheduled monument. | II* |
| St Paul's Church; 54.29816°N 3.01800°W | | 1745 | The oldest part of the church is the tower, the rest of the church being rebuilt in 1866–69 by Ewan Christian and Miles Thompson. The church is built in slate rubble with ashlar dressings, and consists of a nave, a chancel with a north vestry, and a west tower. The tower has diagonal buttresses, a west doorway with a pointed arch, and an embattled parapet. | II |
| Tottlebank Baptist Chapel; 54.25159°N 3.05367°W | | c. 1750 | The chapel is in roughcast stone with a slate roof, one storey, and seven bays. At the rear is a two-bay gabled transept and a gabled wing. The windows and the two entrances have segmental heads. | II |
| Bouthray Bridge; 54.29152°N 3.09028°W | — | 18th century (probable) | The bridge carries a road, Water Yeat, over the River Crake. It is in stone, and consists of two segmental arches, that to the east being the wider. The pier has a cutwater to the north, and the parapet is plain and contains an inscribed stone. | II |
| Green Bank and outbuilding 54.27624°N 3.04838°W | — | 18th century | The house and outbuilding are in stone, the house is roughcast, and the roof is slated. The house has two storeys, two bays, sash windows, and a timber gabled lattice porch. The outbuilding has a wide entrance and a loading door above. (Note: Street View in April 2009 shows that the outbuilding has been converted for residential use.) | II |
| Old Hall Farmhouse and cottage 54.26137°N 3.03680°W | | 18th century | Two houses in roughcast stone with a slate roof. The main part has three storeys and three bays, and there is a receding wing at the right with two storeys and three bays. Most of the windows are sashes, with some casement windows in the wing. | II |
| Barn, Old Hall Farm; 54.26103°N 3.03681°W | — | 18th century (probable) | The barn is in stone with a slate roof. On the north front is a gallery approached by stone steps, to the left is a two-storey gabled extension and a lean-to outshut, and to the right is a gabled wing. The wing has a moulded entrance that has a lintel with a date, initials and an escutcheon, and elsewhere are more doorways and windows. | II |
| Rusland Pool Bridge; 54.28868°N 3.01743°W | | 18th century (possible) | A stone accommodation bridge over a stream, consisting of a single segmental arch. The bridge has thin voussoirs, a low parapet, and is about 2 metres (6 ft 7 in) wide. | II |
| Thwaite Moss House; 54.30017°N 3.01371°W | — | 18th century (probable) | A roughcast stone house with a slate roof and two storeys. The main part has two bays, sash windows, and an open timber porch. To the rear is a three-bay wing with two doorways and a loading door in the upper storey. The wing contains a cross-mullioned window, a cellar window, and fixed windows with opening lights. | II |
| High Bethecar, barn and outbuilding 54.29890°N 3.07184°W | — | 1756 | The building is in stone with a slate roof. The farmhouse has quoins, two storeys, three bays, and a rear outshut and stair wing. On the front is a gabled porch, and the windows are 20th-century casements. The outbuilding to the left has a partly blocked entrance, and the barn to the right has a doorway, small windows, and a pitching hole. | II |
| Milestone; 54.26756°N 2.98089°W | — | c. 1763 | The milestone was provided for the Kendal to Kirkby Ireleth Turnpike Trust. It consists of a round-headed post inscribed with "11", the distance in miles from Kendal. | II |
| Milestone; 54.26679°N 2.99924°W | — | c. 1763 | The milestone was provided for the Kendal to Kirkby Ireleth Turnpike Trust. It consists of a round-headed post inscribed with "13", the distance in miles from Kendal. | II |
| Milestone; 54.24096°N 3.05964°W | — | c. 1763 | The milestone was provided for the Kendal to Kirkby Ireleth Turnpike Trust. It consists of a round-headed post inscribed with "17", the distance in miles from Kendal. | II |
| Sundial; 54.26538°N 3.04825°W | — | 1764 | The sundial is in the churchyard of Holy Trinity Church. It has a concrete base dated 1886 on which is a stone base, a chamfered post with a square head, a round plate and a gnomon. | II |
| Mounting block 54.26571°N 3.04804°W | — | 1767 | The mounting block is in the churchyard of Holy Trinity Church to the south of the churchyard wall. It is in stone and consists of five steps. | II |
| Pennington Lodge Tower; 54.27417°N 2.96919°W | | 1799 | The tower was built to celebrate English naval victories. It is built in slate and has two stages, with projecting courses, two slots on each face in both stages, and an embattled parapet. In the south face is a blocked entrance with a pointed head, and in the upper stage is an inscribed oval plaque; the other faces have round openings. | II |
| Former Smithy; 54.27660°N 3.04746°W | — | 18th or early 19th century | The former smithy is in stone with a slate roof. It consists of a small square building with an outshut to the south, and a lean-to shed to the north. The doorway is in the outshut, there is one casement window, the remains of another, and the remains of a sash window; all these have timber lintels. | II |
| Swan Hotel; 54.26918°N 2.96979°W | | Late 18th or early 19th century | The hotel is in roughcast stone with slate roofs. The main block has three storeys with attics and five bays, to the left is a two-storey five-bay wing, and to the right is a 20th-century wing. The first bay of the main block projects forward, it is gabled and contains a large segmental-headed window. The other windows are sashes, and in the roof are gabled dormers. The main entrance has a porch with plastic Doric columns, a frieze and a cornice, and on the top is a model of a swan. | II |
| The Spire; 54.26979°N 2.99013°W | | c. 1800 (possible | A stone monument, whose origin is uncertain, consisting of a rectangular obelisk. It stands on a rectangular plinth, and has two projecting courses. In the northwest face is a recess. | II |
| Whitestock Hall; 54.29184°N 3.03335°W | — | 1802 | The house was extended in 1850, and is in roughcast stone with a slate roof. There are two storeys, five bays, a rear wing, and low flanking bays connecting to single-storey single-bay pavilions. The main part has a band, a top cornice, and a coped parapet. The windows are sashes, and in the centre is a porch with unfluted Doric columns, a frieze and a cornice. Above the door is a fanlight, and the pavilions have simple pediments. | II |
| Accommodation bridge 54.27524°N 2.95668°W | — | 1869 | The accommodation bridge carries a private path over the Lakeside and Haverthwaite Railway. Stone piers carry cast iron girders and form three spans. The bridge has an interrupted parapet with moulded copings connected by iron railings. | II |
| St Peter's Church; 54.28218°N 2.97305°W | | 1873–74 | The church was designed by Paley and Austin with Norman features and lancet windows. It is built in stone rubble with sandstone dressings, and has a slate roof with coped gables and ridge tiles. The church consists of a nave with a north porch, a chancel, a tower between the nave and chancel, and a north organ loft and vestry. The tower has buttresses, a diamond-shaped clock face to the south, and is surmounted by a high pyramidal roof with dormers, some with louvred bell openings. | II* |

== Notes and references ==
=== Sources ===
- Historic England, "Water basin approximately 90 metres to west of Church of Holy Trinity, Colton (1225157)", National Heritage List for England
- Historic England, "Potash Kiln, Colton (1225182)", National Heritage List for England
- Historic England, "Low Lingmire Farm and five associated agricultural buildings, Colton (1393892)", National Heritage List for England
- Historic England, "Church of Holy Trinity, Colton (1224965)", National Heritage List for England
- Historic England, "Underfield, Colton (1266432)", National Heritage List for England
- Historic England, "Nibthwaite Grange, Colton (1224964)", National Heritage List for England
- Historic England, "Water Side House, Colton (1225329)", National Heritage List for England
- Historic England, "Glen View and Old Smithy, Colton (1225403)", National Heritage List for England
- Historic England, "Abbot Park Farmhouse, Colton (1266554)", National Heritage List for England
- Historic England, "Cobby House, Colton (1225180)", National Heritage List for England
- Historic England, "Crossland House with outbuilding, Colton (1266356)", National Heritage List for England
- Historic England, "Ferndale Cottage and Rose Cottage, Colton (1266568)", National Heritage List for England
- Historic England, "Finsthwaite House, Colton (1266491)", National Heritage List for England
- Historic England, "Jolliver Tree Cottage, Colton (1225179)", National Heritage List for England
- Historic England, "Jolliver Tree Farmhouse, Colton (1225178)", National Heritage List for England
- Historic England, "Low Parkamoor with attached outbuilding, Colton (1225184)", National Heritage List for England
- Historic England, "Steenkot and The Old Cottage, Colton (1225404)", National Heritage List for England
- Historic England, "Tom Crag, Colton (1266492)", National Heritage List for England
- Historic England, "High Stott Park House and Cottage, Colton (1266436)", National Heritage List for England
- Historic England, "Rook How Friends' Meeting House and cottage, Colton (1225464)", National Heritage List for England
- Historic England, "Stable to north-east of Rook How Meeting House, Colton (1225408)", National Heritage List for England
- Historic England, "Rusland Hall, Colton (1266367)", National Heritage List for England
- Historic England, "Nibthwaite Mill, Colton (1225382)", National Heritage List for England
- Historic England, "Nibthwaite furnace, Colton (1007072)", National Heritage List for England
- Historic England, "Church of St Paul, Colton (1225406)", National Heritage List for England
- Historic England, "Tottlebank Baptist Chapel, Colton (1266470)", National Heritage List for England
- Historic England, "Bouthray Bridge, Colton (1266495)", National Heritage List for England
- Historic England, "Green Bank and attached outbuilding, Colton (1266396)", National Heritage List for England
- Historic England, "Old Hall Farmhouse and cottage, Colton (1225108)", National Heritage List for England
- Historic England, "Barn approximately 30 metres to south of Old Hall Farmhouse, Colton (1266567)", National Heritage List for England
- Historic England, "Rusland Pool Bridge, Colton (1225473)", National Heritage List for England
- Historic England, "Thwaite Moss House, Colton (1225405)", National Heritage List for England
- Historic England, "High Bethecar with attached barn and outbuilding, Colton (1266394)", National Heritage List for England
- Historic England, "Milestone approximately 370 metres west of Water Side House, Colton (1266494)", National Heritage List for England
- Historic England, "Milestone approximately 25 metres west of junction with lane to north, Colton (1225411)", National Heritage List for England
- Historic England, "Milestone approximately 23 metres to north-east of Penny Bridge, Colton (1266493)", National Heritage List for England
- Historic England, "Sundial approximately 19 metres south of Church of Holy Trinity, Colton (1225124)", National Heritage List for England
- Historic England, "Mounting block to north of churchyard wall of Church of Holy Trinity, Colton (1224966)", National Heritage List for England
- Historic England, "Pennington Lodge Tower, Colton (1225215)", National Heritage List for England
- Historic England, "Former Smithy, Colton (1225383)", National Heritage List for England
- Historic England, "Swan Hotel, Colton (1225183)", National Heritage List for England
- Historic England, "The Spire, Colton (1225181)", National Heritage List for England
- Historic England, "Whitestock Hall, Colton (1266357)", National Heritage List for England
- Historic England, "Accommodation bridge carrying a private path over the Lakeside and Haverthwaite Railway (NGR SD 871377), Colton (1225749)", National Heritage List for England
- Historic England, "Church of St Peter, Colton (1225177)", National Heritage List for England
- Historic England, Listed Buildings
- Hyde, Matthew; Pevsner, Nikolaus (2010) [1967], Cumbria, The Buildings of England, New Haven and London: Yale University Press, ISBN 978-0-300-12663-1
