= K2B =

K2B may refer to:

- Karma to Burn, a band from Morgantown, West Virginia
- Keswick to Barrow, an annual 40-mile charity walking race in Cumbria, England
- Haplogroup K2b (disambiguation)
