= Satterthwaite & Rusland School =

Satterthwaite and Rusland Church of England School
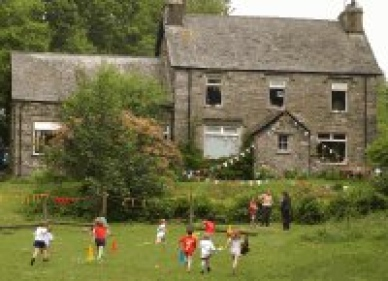
- Children playing on the paddock in front of the school.

Location
- Satterthwaite, Cumbria, LA12 8LL; England
- Coordinates: 54.31329°N 3.01734°W

Information
- Type: Voluntary Controlled
- Religious affiliation: Church of England
- Established: 1855
- Closed: 2006
- Local authority: Cumbria
- Department for Education URN: 112285 Tables
- Ofsted: Reports
- Headmaster: Allan Wilson
- Gender: Coeducational
- Age: 4 to 11
- Enrolment: 9

Satterthwaite & Rusland School was a Church of England Primary school near Force Forge in the Rusland Valley. The school was established in 1840 for children aged 4 to 11, and closed in 2006 with just 9 pupils. The site has since been converted into affordable housing.

The school was renowned for its rural setting with large grounds for children to play in, and for providing a wide range of extra-curricular activities including: football, hockey, rounders, athletics, swimming, roller-blading and cricket. The school also provided an unusually wide range of opportunities including: canoeing, climbing, gorge walking, fell walking, orienteering and problem solving activities.

== History ==
The school was founded to cope with the dramatic increase in the population of the area as workers settled to man the three new bobbin mills constructed during the Industrial Revolution. Although both Satterthwaite and Rusland already had chapels serving as primary schools they were not able to cope with the increased student numbers.

Animosity between residents meant that parents from Rusland refused to let their children go to school in Satterthwaite and vice versa, so a new building site was offered equidistant from the two chapels, in an isolated spot just within the bounds of Satterthwaite. In order to found the school the parish set up a building fund, notable for the donation of 1 shilling made by the famous poet William Wordsworth.

Satterthwaite and Rusland National School, the name under which it was founded, could accommodate 100 pupils, although the student count never exceeded 80. The building and grounds were large, including a spacious nine-roomed house attached for the master. In 1855 a government inspector described the school as "the best country school in the country", whilst other reports say that the pupils excelled in mathematics and were also reciting poetry and performing Shakespearean plays.
