= St Peter's Church, Finsthwaite =

Coordinates: 54.2821°N 2.9711°W

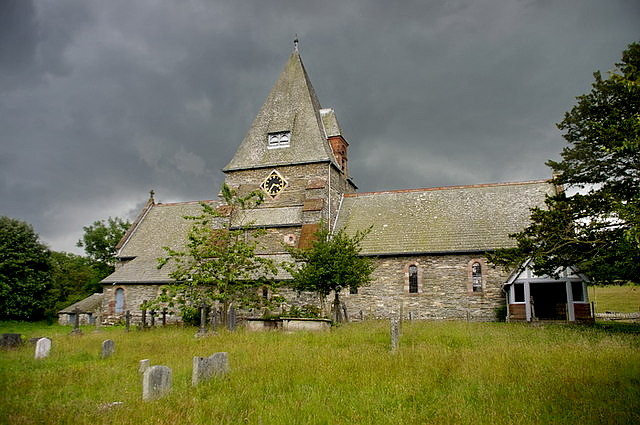
- St Peter's Church, Finsthwaite, from the north

- Location in Cumbria
- OS grid reference: SD 369,878
- Location: Finsthwaite, Cumbria
- Country: England
- Denomination: Anglican
- Website: http://www.finsthwaitechurch.uk/

History
- Status: Parish church
- Dedication: Saint Peter

Architecture
- Functional status: Active
- Heritage designation: Grade II*
- Designated: 23 July 1987
- Architect: Paley and Austin
- Architectural type: Church
- Style: Romanesque Revival
- Groundbreaking: 1873
- Completed: 1874

Specifications
- Materials: Stone rubble with sandstone dressings Slate roof

Administration
- Province: York
- Diocese: Carlisle
- Archdeaconry: Windermere
- Deanery: Leven Valley
- Parish: Finsthwaite

Clergy
- Vicar: Revd Canon Peter Noel Calvert

St Peter's Church is in the village of Finsthwaite, Cumbria, England. It is an active Anglican parish church in the deanery of Windermere, the archdeaconry of Westmorland and Furness, and the diocese of Carlisle. Formerly part of Cartmel Peninsula Team Ministry, it is now part of the Leven Valley benefice, together with St Anne Haverthwaite and St Mary Staveley-in-Cartmel. The church is recorded in the National Heritage List for England as a designated Grade II* listed building. St Peter's was designed by the Lancaster partnership of Paley and Austin. They were the winners of a competition to design "mountain chapels" organised by the Carlisle Church Extension Society in 1873. The authors of the Buildings of England series describe the church as "a brilliant essay", and write that "one would have to search far and search long in England to find village churches to vie with" this and two other Austin and Paley churches, Torver and Dolphinholme. The church stands to the southeast of the village.

== History ==
The church was built in 1873–74 to replace a chapel dating from 1724 to 1725. It was paid for by Thomas Newby Wilson of Newby Bridge, the proprietor of the Stott Park Bobbin Mill. The church provided seating for 200 people, and cost £4,170 (equivalent to £540,000 in 2025).

== Architecture ==
=== Exterior ===
The church is constructed in coursed stone rubble with sandstone dressings. It has a slate roof and tiles on the ridges. Its architectural style is Norman. The plan consists of a four-bay nave, a north porch and a chancel. Between the nave and chancel is a tower. To the north of the tower are an organ chamber and a vestry. Along the side of the nave are round-headed lancet windows. At the west end are two windows, with a lancet window above them. The porch is timber framed on stone walls and has a gable. It leads to the round-headed entrance to the church. On the north and south sides of the tower are buttresses, and between them are projections. In the south projection is a lancet window, with a small window above it. There are two windows in the vestry. At the east end of the chancel are three windows, the central one being wider than the others and a lancet window above them. On the gable of the east end is a cross finial. There are two windows on the south side of the chancel. On the upper part of the tower is a diamond-shaped clock face. The tower has a high pyramidal roof. On the north and south sides of the roof are louvred dormer windows, and on the east and west sides are stone dormers containing round-headed louvred bell openings.

=== Interior ===
The ceiling is painted with scrollwork, and with angels carrying copies of the Beatitudes. Around the nave and window arches are a stencilled frieze, part of which has been covered with whitewash. The reredos is made from alabaster and mosaic, it dates from 1883, and was made by Salviati. The rest of the furnishings were designed by the architects. These include the altar rails, the chancel floor, the pulpit, the lectern, and the font, which is made from fossiliferous marble. There is stained glass in the east and west windows by Shrigley and Hunt, that in the west windows containing musical quotations from Handel's Messiah. The two-manual organ was made by Jardine and company of Manchester in 1875.

== See also ==
- Grade II* listed buildings in Westmorland and Furness
- Listed buildings in Colton, Cumbria
- List of ecclesiastical works by Paley and Austin
- Plan of Finsthwaite Churchyard
