= Crosslands =

Hamlet in Cumbria, England

Coordinates: 54.296°N 3.010°W

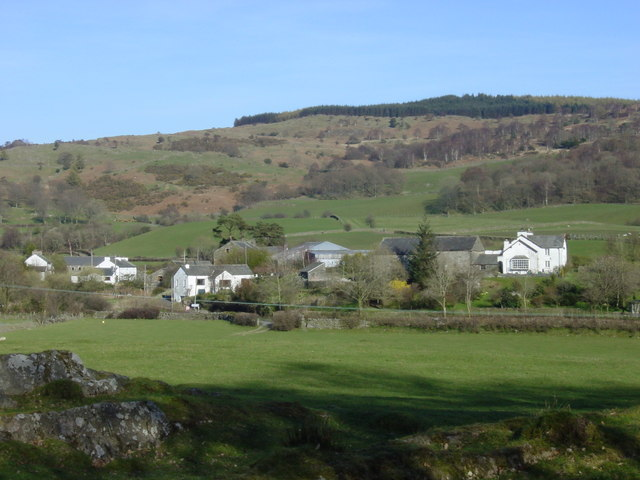
- Crosslands

- Location in South Lakeland Location within Cumbria
- OS grid reference: SD342894
- Civil parish: Colton
- Unitary authority: Westmorland and Furness
- Ceremonial county: Cumbria
- Region: North West
- Country: England
- Sovereign state: United Kingdom
- Post town: ULVERSTON
- Postcode district: LA12
- Dialling code: 01229
- Police: Cumbria
- Fire: Cumbria
- Ambulance: North West
- UK Parliament: Westmorland and Lonsdale

Crosslands is a hamlet in the Westmorland and Furness district of Cumbria, England. It is located just to the northeast of Rusland in the civil parish of Colton.
