= Finsthwaite Heights =

Upland area in Cumbria, England

Coordinates: 54°17′12″N 2°58′56″W

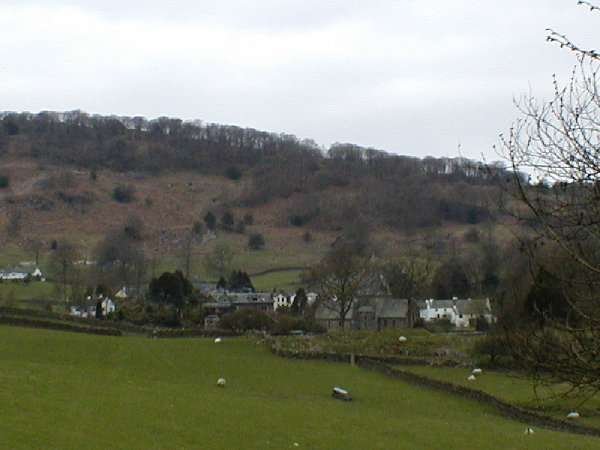
Finsthwaite village and Finsthwaite Heights

Finsthwaite Heights is an upland area in the English Lake District, above Finsthwaite, Cumbria. It reaches about 750 feet (230 m).

It is the subject of a chapter of Wainwright's book The Outlying Fells of Lakeland. Wainwright's walk starts from Newby Bridge, climbs through woodland passing a tower which has a 1799 inscription commemorating the Royal Navy, passes through the village, and climbs to the man-made tarns of Low Dam and High Dam. These were made to provide power for Stott Park Bobbin Mill. Wainwright says of his route: "Everywhere the surroundings are delightful. But this is not fellwalking."
