= Kirkby Ireleth =

Civil parish in Cumbria, England

Coordinates: 54.232°N 3.190°W

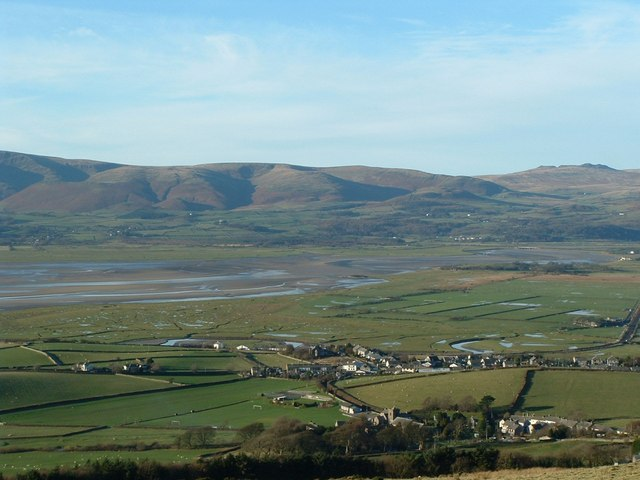
- View over Kirkby in Furness from Kirkby Moor

- Location within Cumbria
- Population: 1,201 (Parish, 2021)
- OS grid reference: SD2282
- Civil parish: Kirkby Ireleth
- Unitary authority: Westmorland and Furness
- Ceremonial county: Cumbria
- Region: North West
- Country: England
- Sovereign state: United Kingdom
- Post town: KIRKBY-IN-FURNESS
- Postcode district: LA17
- Dialling code: 01229
- Police: Cumbria
- Fire: Cumbria
- Ambulance: North West
- UK Parliament: Barrow and Furness

Kirkby Ireleth is a civil parish in the Westmorland and Furness district of the English county of Cumbria. It includes the villages of Grizebeck and Kirkby-in-Furness - which is really a collection of six different hamlets, namely: Soutergate, Wall End, Beck Side, Sand Side, Marshside and Chapels; and other outlying settlements including Bailiff Ground, Gargreave, Friars' Ground, Beanthwaite, Dove Bank, Dove Ford and Woodland.

== History ==
Kirkby Ireleth was an ancient parish in the Lonsdale Hundred of Lancashire. The parish was subdivided into three townships: Broughton West (also known as Broughton-in-Furness), Dunnerdale-with-Seathwaite, and a Kirkby Ireleth township covering the southern and eastern parts of the parish. The latter township was further subdivided into sections called Heathwaite, Kirkby Moor, Low Quarter, Middle Quarter, and Woodland.

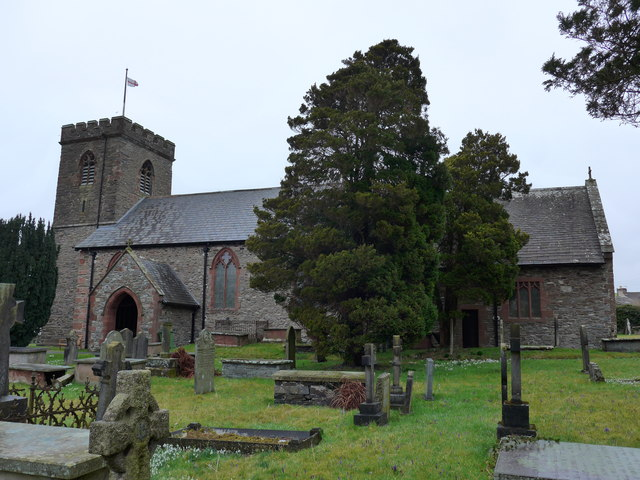
Parish Church of St Cuthbert at Beck Side

The parish church, dedicated to St Cuthbert, was in the Low Quarter, at Beck Side. The building dates back to the 12th century.

From the 17th century onwards, parishes were gradually given various civil functions under the poor laws, in addition to their original ecclesiastical functions. In some cases, including Kirkby Ireleth, the civil functions were exercised by each township separately rather than the parish as a whole. In 1866, the legal definition of 'parish' was changed to be the areas used for administering the poor laws, and so the three townships also became separate civil parishes.

The civil parish today retains the name Kirkby Ireleth, but it was historically also known as Kirkby-in-Furness. The latter version of the name was adopted by the General Post Office as the name for the post town covering the area.

== Governance ==
There are two tiers of local government covering Kirkby Ireleth, at parish and unitary authority level: Kirkby Ireleth Parish Council and Westmorland and Furness Council.

When elected parish and district councils were created under the Local Government Act 1894, Kirkby Ireleth was included in the Ulverston Rural District, which was renamed North Lonsdale Rural District in 1960. North Lonsdale Rural District was abolished in 1974, and Kirkby Ireleth became part of the South Lakeland district in the new county of Cumbria. South Lakeland was abolished in 2023 when the new Westmorland and Furness Council was created, also taking over the functions of the abolished Cumbria County Council in the area.

== Demography ==
At the 2021 census the parish had a population of 1,201. The population was 1,247 at the 2001 census.

== Notable people ==
- Denny Dennis - born Ronald Dennis Pountain, (1913-1993), romantic vocalist during the 1930s to the 1950s.
- Margaret Fell (1614–1702), theologian and co-founder of Quakerism
- Henry 'Harry' Gifford (1884 - 1952), professional rugby league footballer who played for Barrow, Lancashire, England and Great Britain.
- Alfred Basil 'Woody' Woodhall OBE, CzWC, LOM (1897–1968), senior officer in the Royal Air Force during the Second World War.

== See also ==
- Listed buildings in Kirkby Ireleth
