= Finsthwaite =

Village in Cumbria, England

Coordinates: 54.282°N 2.972°W

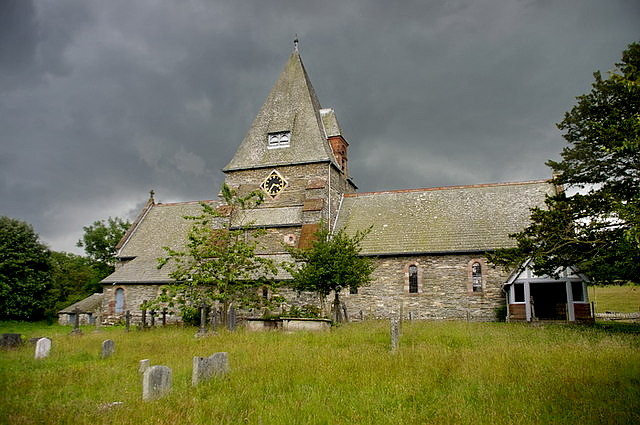
- St. Peter's Church, Finsthwaite

- Location in South Lakeland Location within Cumbria
- OS grid reference: SD366878
- Civil parish: Colton
- Unitary authority: Westmorland and Furness
- Ceremonial county: Cumbria
- Region: North West
- Country: England
- Sovereign state: United Kingdom
- Post town: ULVERSTON
- Postcode district: LA12
- Dialling code: 015395
- Police: Cumbria
- Fire: Cumbria
- Ambulance: North West
- UK Parliament: Westmorland and Lonsdale

Finsthwaite is a small village in the Westmorland and Furness district, in the county of Cumbria, England. It is located near the Furness Fells and Windermere. Finsthwaite has a place of worship, St Peter's Church, and a Bobbin Mill called Stott Park Bobbin Mill, now a working museum.

Overlooking the village is Finsthwaite Heights, which is one of Alfred Wainwright's Outlying Fells of Lakeland.

Finsthwaite is in the civil parish of Colton.

== History ==
A picture of Finsthwaite in the eighteenth century is found in the account book of one of its residents.

== See also ==
- Listed buildings in Colton, Cumbria
