= Kirkby Slate Quarries =

Coordinates: 54.2467°N 3.1539°W

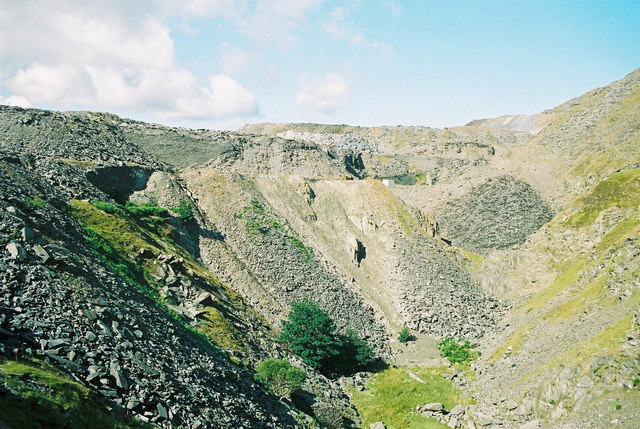
Waste tips in Burlington Slate Quarries, Kirkby-in-Furness.

Kirkby Slate Quarries, formally known as Burlington Slate Quarries, are located near Kirkby-in-Furness in Cumbria, England. The quarries have produced a characteristic blue-grey slate for over 450 years, with large-scale production starting in the early 19th century, when the Cavendish family organised small-scale quarrying activities by local farmers into a larger group of quarries, which then attracted others into the area to live and work in the quarries from the 1820s onwards.

The slates were formed during the Early Devonian when a slaty cleavage was imposed on the Ordovician and Silurian rocks of the area. The best quality slate with the most even and regular cleavage was formed from the lithologically uniform mudstone successions.

The quarrying at Burlington can be directly related to the development of Kirkby, which merged from six smaller farming hamlets: Soutergate, Wall End, Beck Side, Sand Side, Marshside and Chapels. The opening of the slate quarry helped merge these, the name Kirkby dating from the construction of the Cumbrian Coast railway line to the village.

The quarry does not have a galleries system, as many quarries are, but as an enormous pit several hundred feet in depth. The quarry operations have spread throughout and under Kirkby Moor, but now production only takes place at the very bottom of the quarry, with the rock being removed via a cutting from a shallower part of the pit.

The slate blocks were initially removed from the large open pits by blasting and then reduced to a manageable size using a mell (sledge hammer) and tully (long-handled wedge-shaped hammer) before being transported to the cutting sheds, sawn to size and riven into thin slates. Typical of many Welsh slate quarries, such as Dinorwig, Penrhyn and Rhiw-Bach, Burlington adopted the use of a long series of inclined trackways and water balance lifts to provide material transport from the quarries. The lowest of the series was the Sandside, which connected Burlington with the port and mainline railway at Sandside on the Duddon Estuary.
