= Listed buildings in Kirkby Ireleth =

Kirkby Ireleth is a civil parish in Westmorland and Furness, Cumbria, England. It contains six listed buildings that are recorded in the National Heritage List for England. Of these, one is listed at Grade I, the highest of the three grades, two are at Grade II*, the middle grade, and the others are at Grade II, the lowest grade. The parish contains the village of Kirkby-in-Furness and smaller settlements including Beck Side and Grizebeck, but is almost completely rural. The former Furness Railway runs through the parish and a footbridge crossing the line at Kirkby-in-Furness railway station is listed. The other listed buildings are a former manor house now a farmhouse, a country house and its garden wall, a church, and a barn.

== Key ==
Grade	Criteria
I	Buildings of exceptional interest, sometimes considered to be internationally important
II*	Particularly important buildings of more than special interest
II	Buildings of national importance and special interest

== Buildings ==
Name and location	Photograph	Date	Notes	Grade
St Cuthbert's Church; 54.22970°N 3.17685°W		c. 1170	The north aisle was added as a chapel in 1523, and was later extended, the chancel was extended in 1698, the tower was rebuilt in 1829, and the church was restored in 1881 and in 1884. The church is built in stone with quoins and it has a slate roof; the chancel arch and gable are timber-framed. The church consists of a nave, a south porch, a north aisle, a chancel, and a west tower. The south doorway and one of the chancel windows are Norman in style, and other chancel windows are Perpendicular.	II*
Kirkby Hall; 54.24184°N 3.17436°W		c. 1450	Originally a manor house, it was extended in about 1530. The house is in roughcast stone with sandstone ashlar dressings and a slate roof, hipped at the west, and consists of a hall with cross-wings, with a flat front. The south front has two storeys and four bays, and most of the windows are mullioned. The doorway has a four-centred head and a moulded surround. To the southeast, and joined by a wall containing bee boles, is an outbuilding that is largely in ruins, and has the remains of two cruck trusses.	I
Ashlack Hall and outbuildings 54.25974°N 3.15779°W		16th century	A country house that was extended in the 17th century. It is built in stone rubble with sandstone ashlar dressings, it is partly roughcast, and has a Welsh slate roof. The house has two storeys and a cruciform plan with a short north wing. The entrance has a triangular head and a hood mould, and many of the windows are mullioned. The east wing is the outbuildings and contains a window and a pitching hole.	II*
Garden wall, Ashlack Hall; 54.25984°N 3.15868°W	—	18th century (or earlier)	The garden wall extends to the south and the southwest of the hall. The north wall contains a bee bole, and in the west wall is a round-headed gateway.	II
Barn opposite Ship Inn; 54.23234°N 3.18655°W	—	Early to mid 18th century	This consists of two barns at right angles, and stables. The earliest part is the west barn, the east barn dating from the early to mid 19th century, and the stables added later. They are in stone with quoins and a slate roof; the west barn also has a plinth. There are various openings, including doors, windows, ventilation slits, and a pitching hole. (Note: Street View in April 2011 shows that the barn has been converted for residential use.)	II
Footbridge; 54.23255°N 3.18759°W		Mid to late 19th century	The footbridge crosses the line in Kirkby-in-Furness railway station. It was built for the Furness Railway, and is in cast and wrought iron. The bridge is canted over the line, and has a landing an steps on both sides. The steps have ornate baluster, the landings are carried on Tuscan columns. The landings and bridge have lattice-work parapets and ball finials.	II

== Notes and references ==
=== Sources ===
- Historic England, "Church of St Cuthbert, Kirkby Ireleth (1086792)", National Heritage List for England
- Historic England, "Kirkby Hall. Kirkby Ireleth (1335963)", National Heritage List for England
- Historic England, "Ashlack Hall and outbuildings, Kirkby Ireleth (1086791)", National Heritage List for England
- Historic England, "Garden wall to west and south-west of Ashlack Hall, Kirkby Ireleth (1186013)", National Heritage List for England
- Historic England, "Barn opposite Ship Inn, Kirkby Ireleth (1335964)", National Heritage List for England
- Historic England, "Railway Footbridge at Kirkby-in-Furness station, Kirkby Ireleth (1086793)", National Heritage List for England
- Historic England, Listed Buildings
- Hyde, Matthew; Pevsner, Nikolaus (2010) [1967], Cumbria, The Buildings of England, New Haven and London: Yale University Press, ISBN 978-0-300-12663-1
