= Keswick to Barrow =

Charity walking race in Cumbria, England

The Keswick to Barrow Walk, also known as the K2B, is a 40 mile charity walking and running event which takes place annually in May in Cumbria, England, between Keswick and Barrow-in-Furness. The walk passes through much of the Lake District. It allows participants to run or walk as they choose. Most choose to walk, while the running contingent compete for the fastest runner trophy.

The walk has it origins in a 1966 challenge between a team of American experts working on the construction of HMS Resolution in Barrow, and local workers from Vickers, the owners of Barrow's shipyard. The challenge was inspired by American President John F. Kennedy's recommendation that "every American should be capable of walking 50 miles a day" The original walk started at the Castlerigg Stone Circle, roughly 50 miles from Barrow, but the length of the walk was in following years reduced to around 40 miles, starting south of Keswick. The walk proved popular and became an annual event. By 1974 it had 1,500 participants, and has continued to grow. Entry is currently capped at 2,900 walkers for logistical reasons, and the event is regularly oversubscribed.

For many years, the route began at Rough How Bridge on the A591 three miles south of Keswick. However, for the walk's fiftieth anniversary in 2016 and again in 2017, the start was moved to near Castlerigg Stone Circle, increasing the distance to around 43 miles. The walk follows minor roads along the west of Thirlmere, before climbing up Dunmail Raise. It passes through the village of Grasmere and over Red Bank into Elterwater and on to Coniston. Walkers then continue along the east bank of Coniston Water to the village of Lowick, before passing over Kirkby Moor, the walk's highest elevation. The route then continues into Low Furness and the village of Marton, passing the South Lakes Wild Animal Park on its way to Dalton-in-Furness. The final stretch runs close to Furness Abbey, before ending at the Hawcoat Park Sports Club in Hawcoat, Barrow. The shorter Coniston to Barrow walk is aimed at teenagers, and joins the main route in Coniston.

Competitors enter in teams of between 6 and 12, and prizes are awarded to both individuals and teams. The competition retains a close association with BAE Systems, current owners of Barrow's shipyard, and teams from the armed forces, with prizes for the best performers among both groups Competitors must raise a minimum of £80 for charity for their entry to be accepted. Up to 2016, more than £3.7M has been donated to charities over the history of the walk.
