= Bobbin =

Spool or cylinder around which thread, line, or wire is coiled

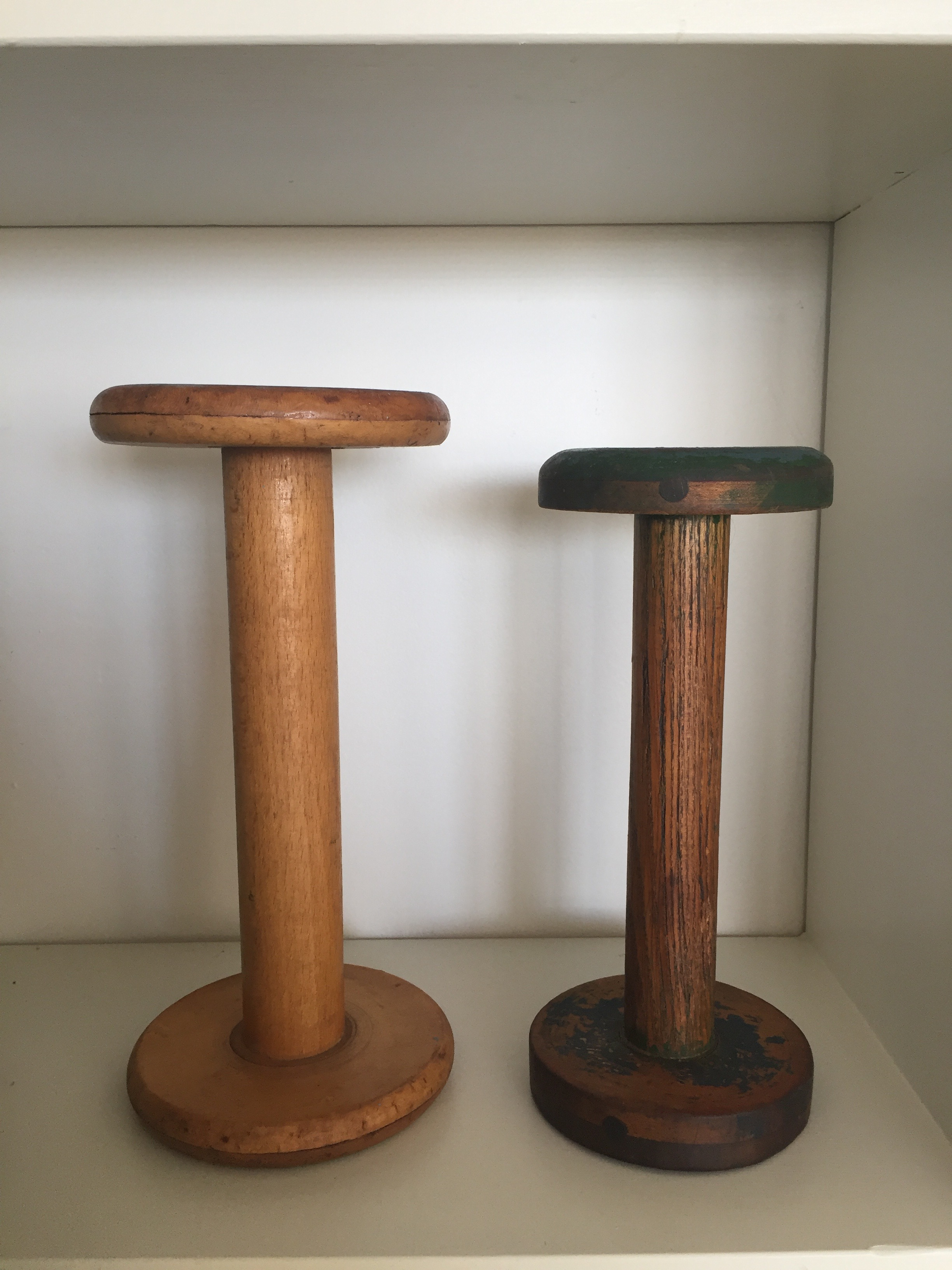
Vintage wooden bobbins, cylindrical, empty of wound fiber, dimensions 16 in. high by 9 in. in diameter.

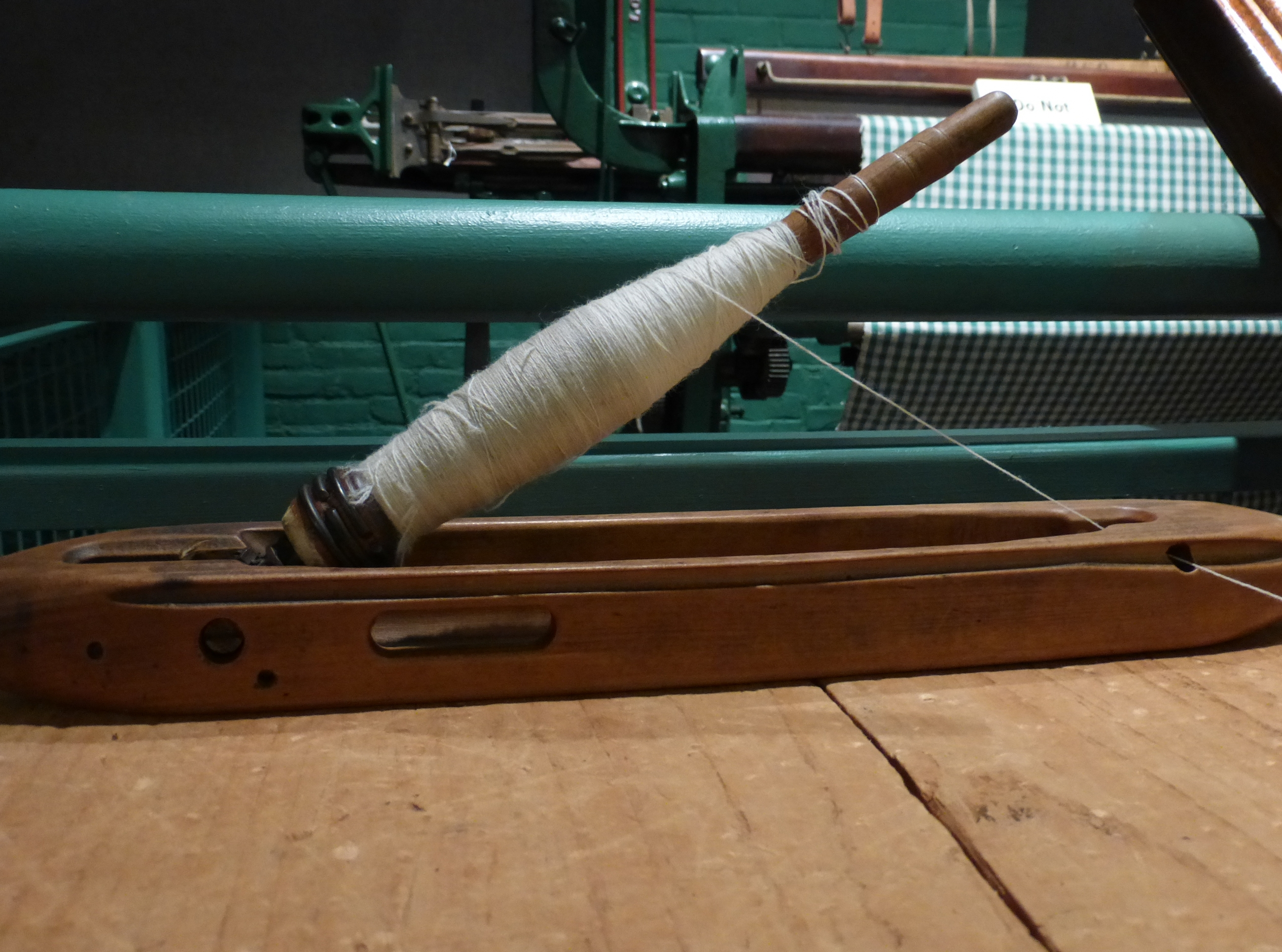
Vintage wooden bobbin, unflanged, wound with yarn and attached to a "shuttle" that fits it for use in a floor loom.

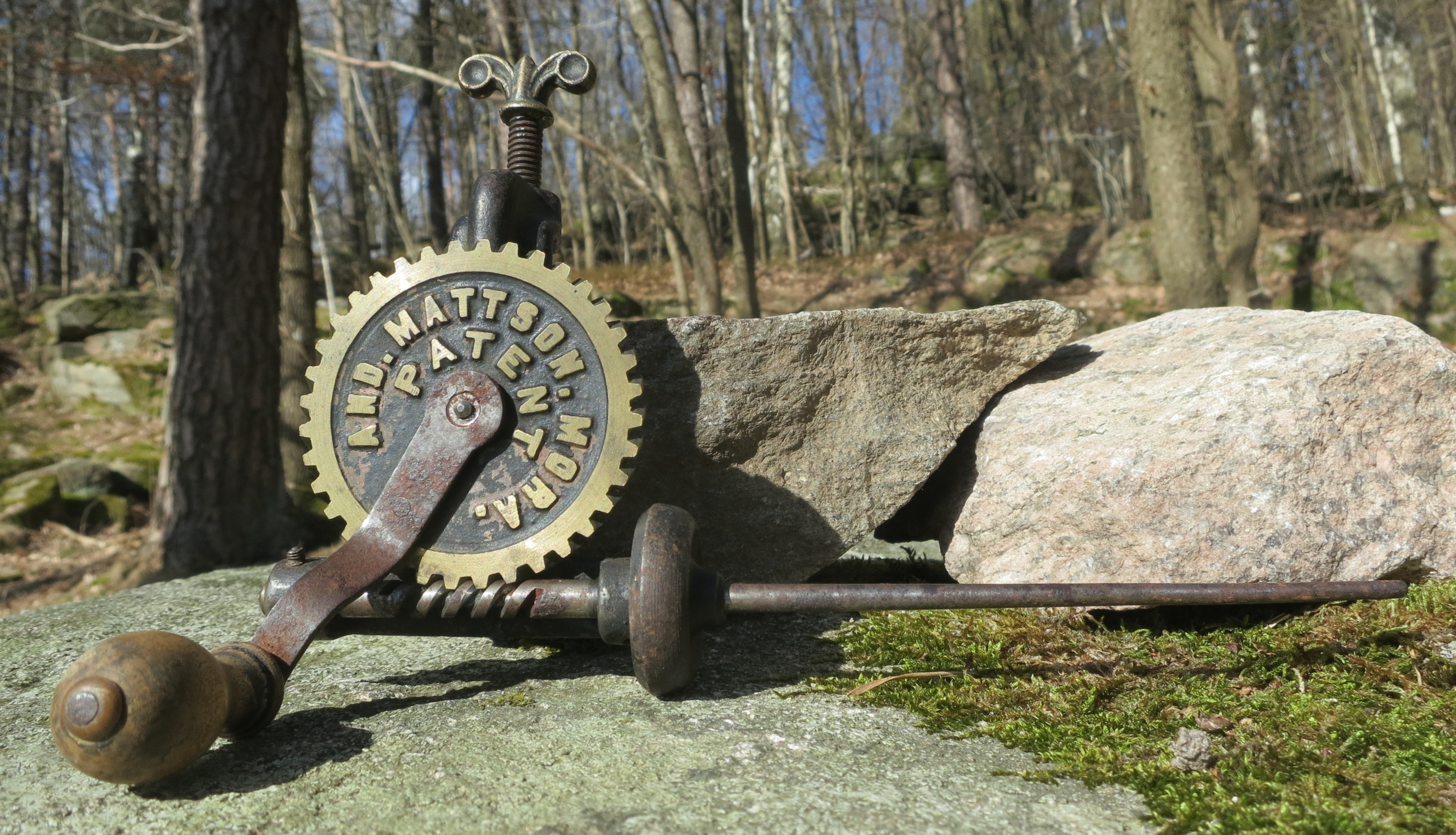
Hand bobbin winder from c. 1900.

A bobbin or spool is a spindle or cylinder, with or without flanges, on which yarn, thread, wire, tape or film is wound. Bobbins are typically found in industrial textile machinery, as well as in sewing machines, fishing reels, tape measures, film rolls, cassette tapes, within electronic and electrical equipment, and for various other applications.

== Industrial textiles ==
Bobbins are used in spinning, weaving, knitting, sewing, and lacemaking. In these practices, bobbins were invented to "manage the piles of thread and yarn that would be mechanically woven into cloth," which would have originally been wound through the use of human power, but which eventually became machine-driven. In these applications, bobbins provide storage, temporary and permanent, for yarn or thread. Historically, bobbins were made out of natural materials such as wood, or bone. While not in principle an invention of the Victorian era - bobbins in the production of textiles were in earlier use - the machinery introduced in that era "were some of [its] greatest inventions" in that they "helped to revolutionize textile manufacturing". In the machines used in such manufacturing,

The automated weaving machines would have hundreds of spindles operating simultaneously, with each spindle holding a bobbin that either released or collected the thread. Most mills had wooden bobbins made specifically for their machinery, which accounts for the many varied shapes and sizes of these spools.

In more modern times, natural bobbin materials such as wood are no longer used in textile manufacturing, instead having been replaced by metal and plastic. The traditional bobbins made, for instance, of hardwoods such as ash and birch are unsuitable for the machinery of modern manufacturing, given the higher speeds involved, and the synthetic materials that are used in weaving; as well, bobbins were relatively customised parts made for the specific machines of each mill (and so of varying designs, each uniquely shaped of wood, with metal parts in places of high wear), thus requiring "a great deal of handwork" such that the cost of continuing to make them was unfavorable to modern textile business.

Since the retirement of the machinery involved, such bobbins and related parts have become items used in craft productions, given the numbers of distinct types, and the fact that "[e]ach... has its own 'battle scars' that give it unique character".

== Sewing and lacemaking ==
=== Sewing ===
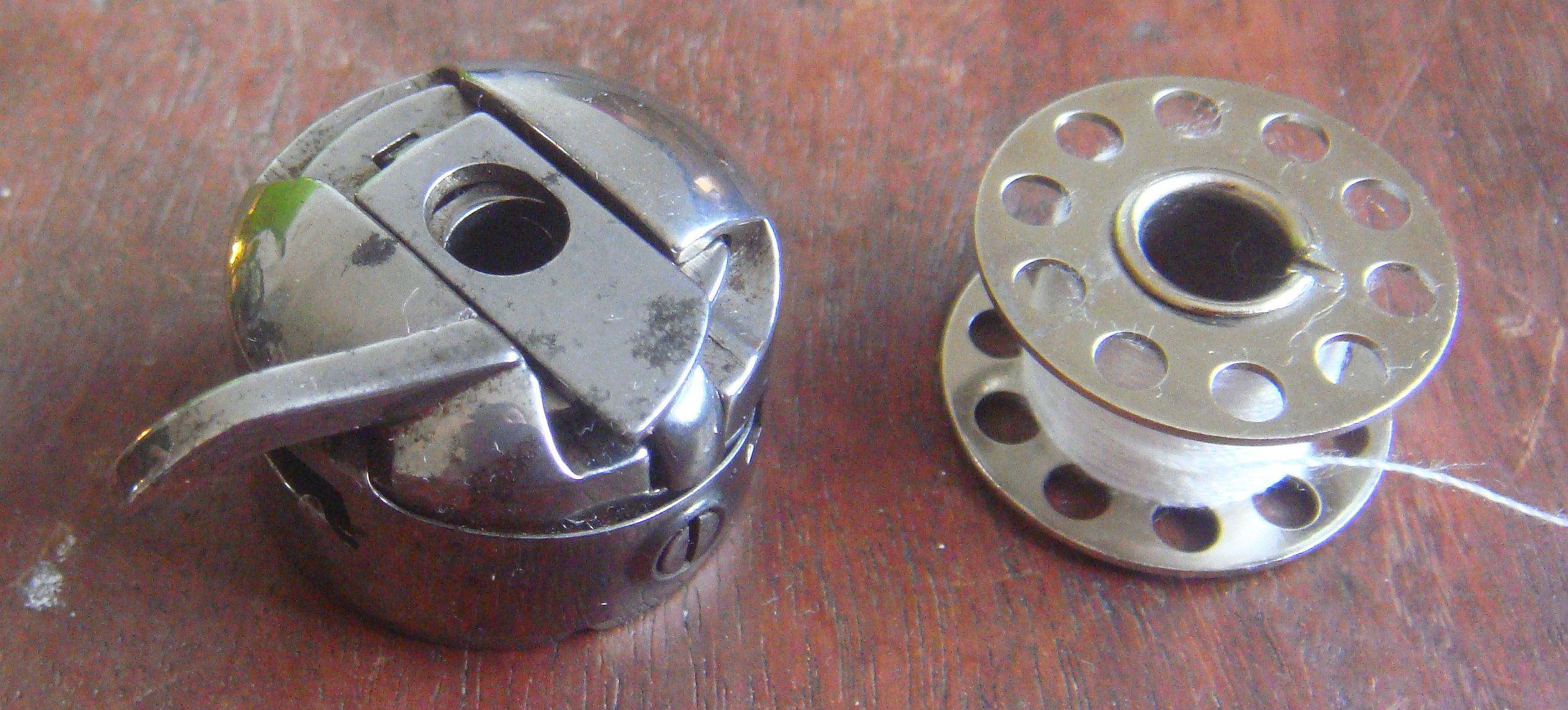
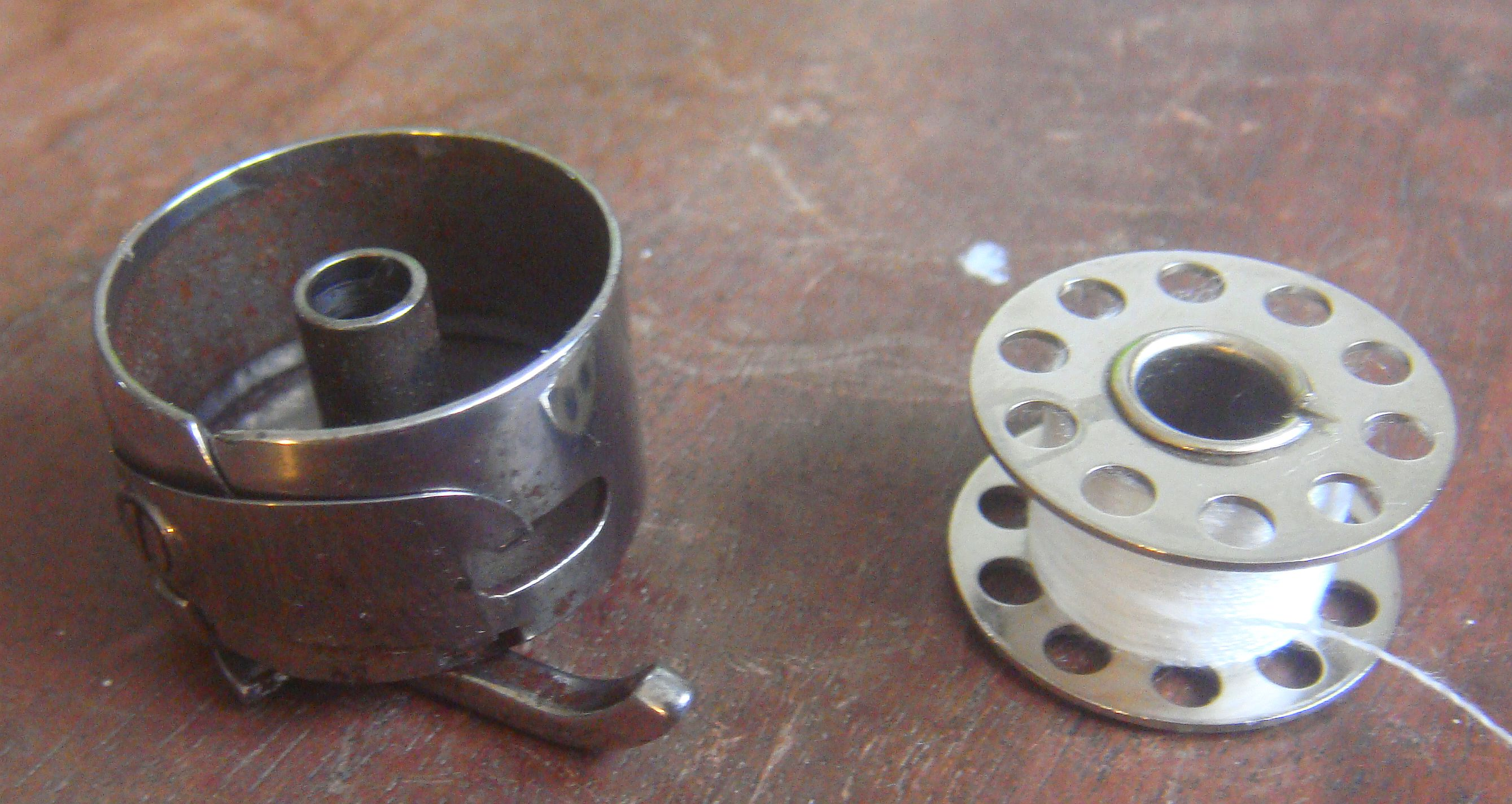
Bobbin (right) and bobbin case for a shuttle hook sewing machine, introduced by Singer for the "Improved Family" model in 1895

The lockstitch sewing machine, invented and developed in the 18th and 19th centuries, forms a stitch with two threads: one passed through a needle and another from a bobbin. Each thread stays on the same side of the material being sewn, interlacing with the other thread at each needle hole thanks to the machine's movement. Tension of the bobbin thread is maintained with a bobbin case, a metal enclosure with a leaf spring which keeps the thread taut. The bobbin case has to be free-floating (not attached to an axle) in order to allow the top thread to pass around the bobbin completely and hook the bobbin thread.

Bobbins vary in shape and size, depending on the style of bobbin driver in the machine for which they are intended to be used. Long, narrow bobbins are used in early transverse shuttle and vibrating shuttle machines. These earlier movements were rendered obsolete by the invention of the rotary hook and the shuttle hook, which run faster and quieter with less air resistance. These shorter, wider bobbins are familiar to modern sewers, as the rotary/shuttle hook remains in use on modern machines essentially unchanged.

=== Lacemaking ===
Bobbin lace requires the winding of yarn onto a temporary storage spindle made of wood (or, in earlier times, bone) often turned on a lathe. Many lace designs require dozens of bobbins at any one time.

Both traditional and contemporary bobbins may be decorated with designs, inscriptions, or pewter or wire inlays. Often, bobbins are 'spangled' to provide additional weight to keep the thread in tension. A hole is drilled near the base to enable glass beads and other ornaments to be attached by a loop of wire. These spangles provide a means of self-expression in the decoration of a tool of the craft.

Antique and unique bobbins, sometimes spangled, are highly sought after by antiques collectors.

== Electrical ==
In electrical applications, transformers, inductors, solenoids, and relay coils use bobbins as permanent containers for the wire to retain shape and rigidity, and to ease assembly of the windings into or onto the magnetic core. (Such coils of wire carrying current create the induced currents and magnetic fields required in these devices.)

Bobbins in these applications may be made of thermoplastic or thermosetting materials (for example, phenolics); this plastic often has to have a TÜV, UL, or other regulatory agency flammability rating for safety reasons.

== Furniture ==
Bobbin furniture (also known as spool furniture) is a style of table or chair with lathe-turned legs.

== Miscellaneous applications ==
Bobbins are also used for fly tying and tidy storage without tangles.

== See also ==
- Stott Park Bobbin Mill
- Axle
- Yo-yo, a toy consisting of a spool and a string
