= Oxen Park =

Hamlet in Cumbria, England

Coordinates: 54.276°N 3.047°W

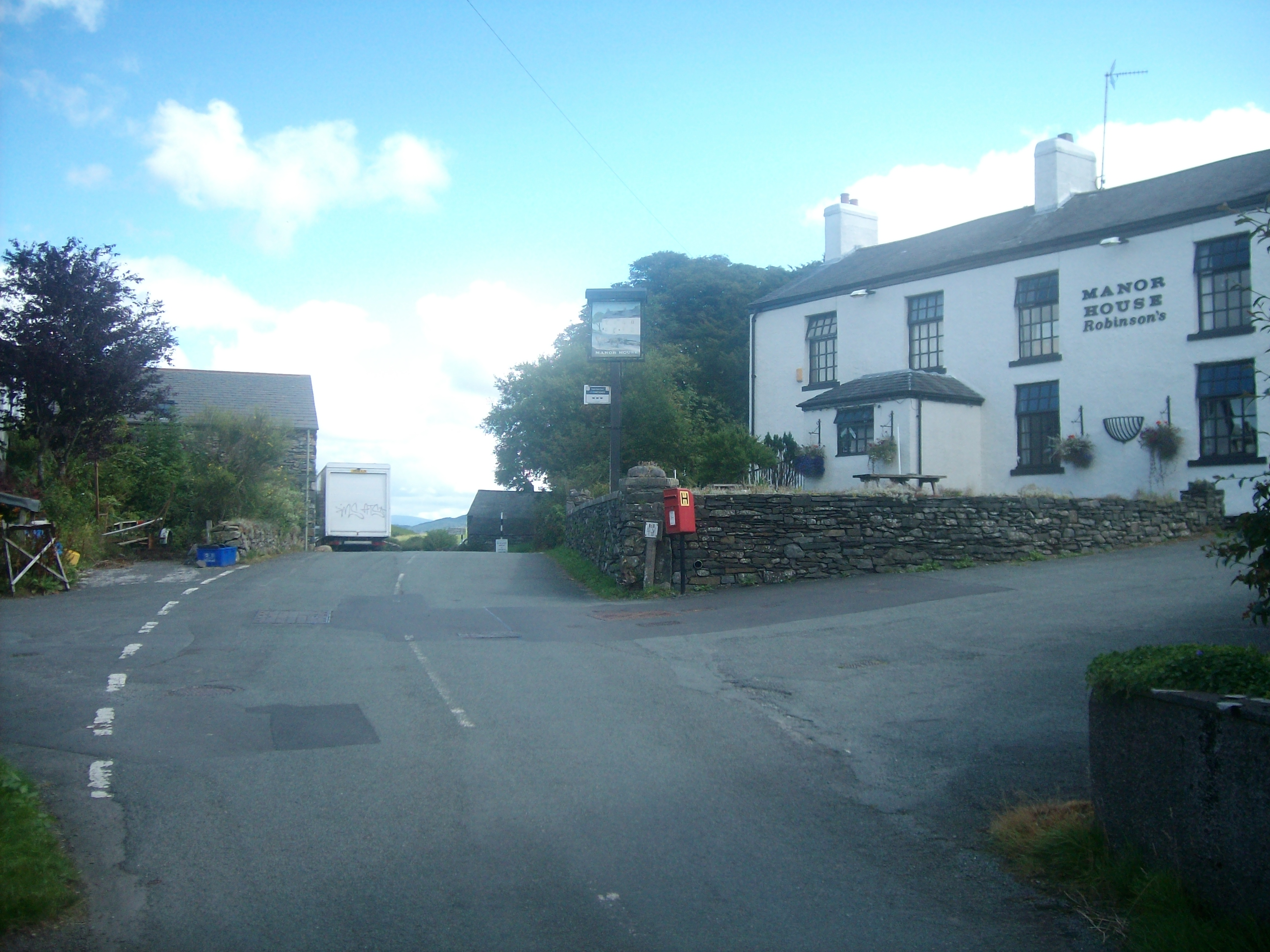
- The main road through Oxen Park

- Location in the former South Lakeland district Location within Cumbria
- OS grid reference: SD318872
- Civil parish: Colton
- Unitary authority: Westmorland and Furness
- Ceremonial county: Cumbria
- Region: North West
- Country: England
- Sovereign state: United Kingdom
- Post town: ULVERSTON
- Postcode district: LA12
- Dialling code: 01229
- Police: Cumbria
- Fire: Cumbria
- Ambulance: North West
- UK Parliament: Westmorland and Lonsdale

Oxen Park is a hamlet in the English county of Cumbria.

Oxen Park lies on the watershed between Rusland and Colton Beck valleys in Westmorland and Furness, and is part of the greater Lake District region. The nearest town is Ulverston 7 miles (11 km) to its south. There are two former smithies (blacksmiths) here, dating from the late 17th/ early 18th century, both of which are Grade II listed buildings. The Manor House public house in Oxen Park was formerly Bank House, which was purchased by Hartleys brewery in 1933, later a Robinson's pub, and now a free house. The Reading Room (Village Hall) here was built in 1902, and underwent a major restoration in 2018/19.

== See also ==
- Listed buildings in Colton, Cumbria
