= Beanthwaite =

Hamlet in Cumbria, England

Coordinates: 54.253°N 3.156°W

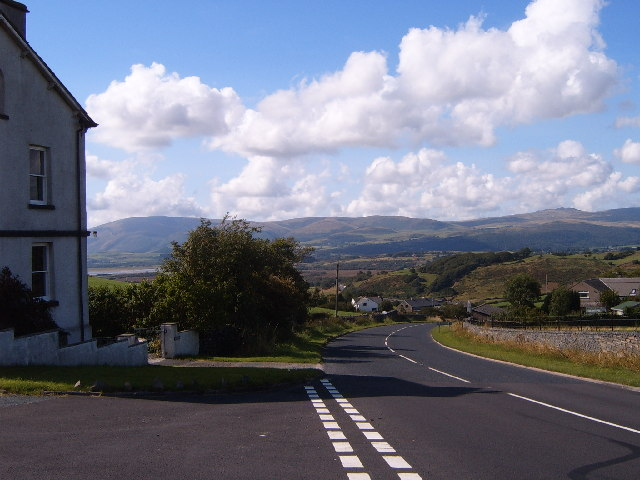
- Beanthwaite

- Location in South Lakeland Location within Cumbria
- OS grid reference: SD246847
- Civil parish: Kirkby Ireleth
- Unitary authority: Westmorland and Furness
- Ceremonial county: Cumbria
- Region: North West
- Country: England
- Sovereign state: United Kingdom
- Post town: KIRKBY-IN-FURNESS
- Postcode district: LA17
- Dialling code: 01484
- Police: Cumbria
- Fire: Cumbria
- Ambulance: North West
- UK Parliament: Barrow and Furness

Beanthwaite is a hamlet in Cumbria, England.
