= Rusland, Cumbria =

Village in Cumbria, England

Coordinates: 54.29°N 3.01°W

Rusland
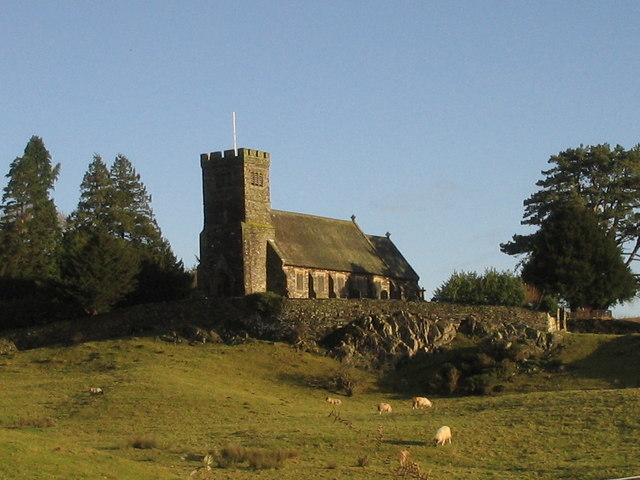
- St. Paul's Church, Rusland

- Location in South Lakeland Location within Cumbria
- OS grid reference: SD342887
- Civil parish: Colton
- Unitary authority: Westmorland and Furness
- Ceremonial county: Cumbria
- Region: North West
- Country: England
- Sovereign state: United Kingdom
- Post town: ULVERSTON
- Postcode district: LA12
- Dialling code: 01229
- Police: Cumbria
- Fire: Cumbria
- Ambulance: North West
- UK Parliament: Westmorland and Lonsdale

Rusland is a village in the Westmorland and Furness district of Cumbria, England. It is located just to the southwest of Crosslands in the civil parish of Colton.

The writer Arthur Ransome is buried in the churchyard of the parish church.

== See also ==
- Listed buildings in Colton, Cumbria
- Bouth village, Cumbria
