= Nibthwaite =

Village in Cumbria, England

Coordinates: 54.300°N 3.083°W

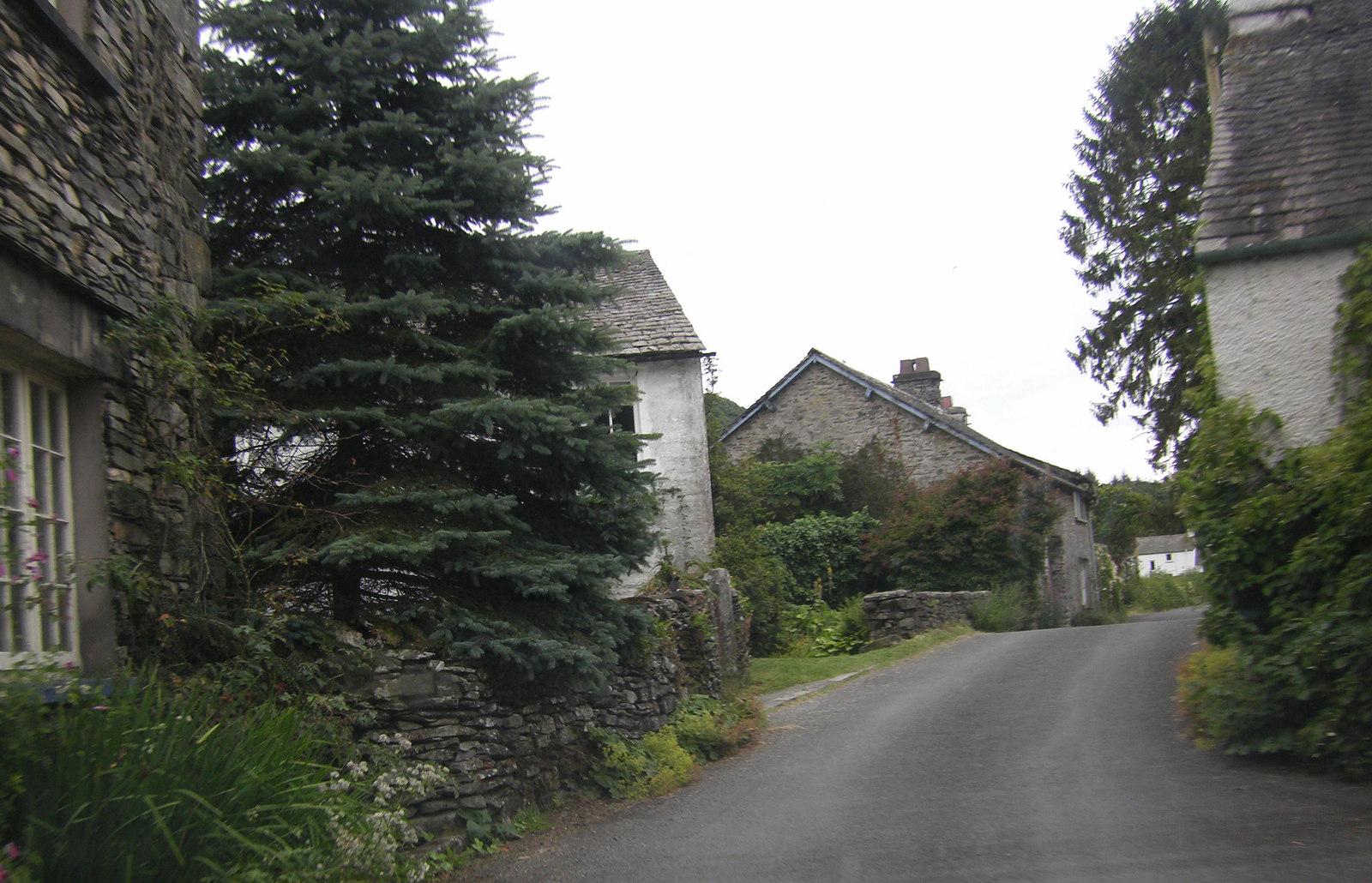
- High Nibthwaite

- Location in South Lakeland Location within Cumbria
- OS grid reference: SD295899
- Civil parish: Colton
- Unitary authority: Westmorland and Furness
- Ceremonial county: Cumbria
- Region: North West
- Country: England
- Sovereign state: United Kingdom
- Post town: ULVERSTON
- Postcode district: LA12
- Dialling code: 01229
- Police: Cumbria
- Fire: Cumbria
- Ambulance: North West
- UK Parliament: Westmorland and Lonsdale

Nibthwaite is a village in the Westmorland and Furness district, in the county of Cumbria in the northwest of England. It is in the civil parish of Colton, and on the east side of Coniston Water. It is in the historic county of Lancashire.

There was a furnace and forge at Nibthwaite from 1751 to 1840, later (c1850) replaced by a bobbin mill, see Harrison Ainslie

The family of the author Arthur Ransome regularly holidayed at Nibthwaite when he was a child, and he incorporated local places and customs into the five of his Swallows and Amazons series of children's books which were set in the Lake District, around a lake based on both Coniston Water and Windermere.

== See also ==
- Listed buildings in Colton, Cumbria
