= Kirkby-in-Furness =

Village in the Furness district of Cumbria, England

Coordinates: 54.231°N 3.187°W

Kirkby in Furness
- Village
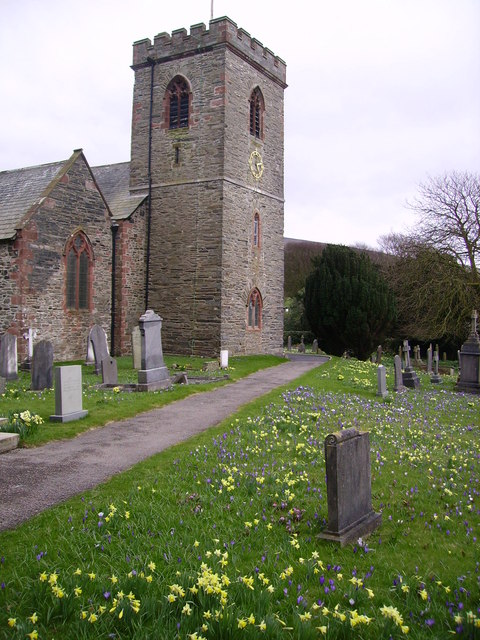
- St Cuthbert's Church

- Location in the former South Lakeland district Location within Cumbria
- Area: 0.2025 km^{2} (0.0782 sq mi)
- Population: 580 (2021 census)
  - Density: 2,864/km^{2} (7,420/sq mi)
- OS grid reference: SD2282
- Civil parish: Kirkby Ireleth
- Unitary authority: Westmorland and Furness
- Ceremonial county: Cumbria
- Region: North West
- Country: England
- Sovereign state: United Kingdom
- Post town: KIRKBY-IN-FURNESS
- Postcode district: LA17
- Dialling code: 01229
- Police: Cumbria
- Fire: Cumbria
- Ambulance: North West
- UK Parliament: Barrow and Furness

Kirkby-in-Furness, generally referred to simply as Kirkby locally, is a village that is the major part of the parish of Kirkby Ireleth in the Furness district of Cumbria, England. Historically part of Lancashire, it is close to the Lake District National Park. It is about 3 miles (5 km) south of Broughton in Furness, 5 miles (8 km) northwest of Ulverston and 9 miles (14 km) north of Barrow-in-Furness. It is one of the largest villages on the peninsula's north-western coast, looking out over the Duddon estuary. To its east is the SSSI of Kirkby Moor and to its west is the SSSI of Duddon Estuary. The 2021 census showed Kirkby to have a population of 580.

== History ==
Kirkby is a collection of six different hamlets, namely: Soutergate, Wall End, Beck Side, Sand Side, Marshside and Chapels. The name Kirkby was used by the Furness Railway company during the construction of its Cumbrian Coast Line, and was the name they gave to the railway station which serves these hamlets. The name Kirkby is much older. The parish of Kirkby Ireleth, a name of Norse origin, is listed in the Domesday Book as one of the townships forming the Manor of Hougun which was held by Tostig Godwinson, Earl of Northumbria.

Much of the housing and infrastructure in Kirkby arose due to the growth and development of the Burlington Slate Quarries, which are owned by the Cavendish family of Holker Hall and Chatsworth House in Derbyshire. Houses at Marshside and Incline Foot were originally built for quarry workers, and the railway linked up to the quarries via a rope-worked Narrow-gauge railway, known as The Long Incline. Present-day Kirkby-in-Furness is now primarily a commuter village but still provides a work force for the slate and agrarian work. The nearby Kirkby Moor rises to 333 metres (1,093 ft) above sea level which features a 12 turbine wind farm.

The village has an increasingly aged population due to the rise in house prices and lack of homes suitable for first time buyers. This has led to young families leaving Kirkby, buying cheaper houses in surrounding towns and villages. As a result, the intake for the local primary school has fallen dramatically in the last few years, and continues to fall.

== Amenities ==
The village has a primary school - Burlington Church of England Primary School - and older children attend Victoria High School at Ulverston or Dowdales School in Dalton-in-Furness with a few attending John Ruskin School in Coniston.

There is a community centre in Beck Side - refurbished in 2019/20 - with changing rooms for the adjacent recreation ground which has a cricket pitch, a football pitch, a crown bowling green, two hard tennis courts and a children's playground. There is also the old village hall, the Beck Side Rooms, in the old, converted, school buildings.

A small shop with limited opening hours is available at Longlands Holiday Park, a private static caravan park, near Chapels and a post office comes to the community centre every Thursday morning, and there is a service station, centrally located in Kirkby at Four Lane Ends and a cafe that is open three days a week - Sunday to Tuesday only - opposite the railway station. There is also a surgery on the road between Four Lane Ends and the railway station.

It has three places of worship: the parish church, St Cuthbert's in Beck Side; a methodist church in Marshside and a Church of Christ meeting house at Wall End.

The village has two pubs, "The Commercial" at Four Lane Ends and "The Ship Inn", which reputedly dates from 1691, near the railway station.

== Sport & leisure ==
The cricket club, football club, bowls club and tennis club are all based at the recreation ground in Beck Side.

The Kirkby in Furness Cricket Club play league fixtures on a Saturday in the Cumbria Cricket League Division 1 and also midweek fixtures on a Wednesday night in the Furness Cricket League. Kirkby United Football Club play in the Furness Premier League; Kirkby-in-Furness Bowls club play a number of competitive matches throughout the summer months and Kirkby Tennis Club compete in the Duddon Tennis League.

Numerous footpaths either originate in, or pass through, the village including the Cumbria Coastal Way from Silverdale in Lancashire to Gretna just over the border in Scotland. This path is now part of the England Coast Path.

The village has a number of active societies, covering a range of interests. These include the History of Kirkby Group, that has numerous publications to its name, the Kirkby Floral and Horticultural Society and the Kirkby Photographic Club.

== Transport ==
Kirkby is situated on the A595 giving direct access to Askam, Dalton-in-Furness and Barrow-in-Furness to the south and villages and towns on the Cumbria Coast to Whitehaven and beyond.

There is a limited bus service for Kirkby, the Blueworks X7 service, running on Wednesdays and Fridays only with the morning bus originating at Coniston and the afternoon bus returning to the same location. This allows a brief return journey to Ireleth, Askam and Barrow, the return service leaving Barrow a little over two and a half hours after the inbound service arrives.

Kirkby-in-Furness railway station is on the Cumbrian Coast Line, with the rail service being provided by Northern. There are regular services southbound to Barrow-in-Furness, a few services continuing further along the Furness Line e.g. to Lancaster, while most northbound services go to Carlisle, a few services not continuing the whole way e.g. to Millom.

== Notable people ==
=== Origins in Kirkby-in-Furness ===
- Henry 'Harry' Gifford (1884-1952), professional rugby league footballer who played for Barrow, Lancashire, England and Great Britain.
- Roger Kirkby (died 1643) was an English politician who sat in the House of Commons from 1640 to 1642, as Member of Parliament for Lancaster. He supported the Royalist cause in the English Civil War and as a result was disabled from sitting on 29 August 1642.
- Richard Kirkby (c. 1625-1681), son of Roger Kirkby (died 1643), was an English politician who sat in the House of Commons from 1661 to 1681 as Member of Parliament for Lancaster.
- Roger Kirkby (c. 1649-1709), son of Richard Kirkby (1625-1681), was an English politician who sat in the House of Commons from 1685 to 1702 as Member of Parliament for Lancaster. He also held the post of Governor of Chester 1693-1702.
- Richard Kirkby (c. 1658–1703), son of Richard Kirkby (1625-1681), was an officer in the Royal Navy, who faced a court-martial as a result of disobedience and cowardice during the naval action of August 1702 - during the War of the Spanish Succession. This led to his execution by firing squad on returning to England.
- Alfred Basil 'Woody' Woodhall OBE, CzWC, LOM (1897-1968), senior officer in the Royal Air Force during the Second World War.

=== Origins elsewhere, but lived in Kirkby-in-Furness ===
- Denny Dennis - born in Derby as Ronald Dennis Pountain, (1913-1993), romantic vocalist during the 1930s to the 1950s. Moved to Kirkby-in-Furness in later life, spending his remaining years living there.
- James Ivan Menzies (1896-1985) was born in Worksop and moved to Kirkby-in-Furness when his father became the village doctor in the early 1910s. After service in World War I, he became a singer and actor with the D'Oyly Carte Opera Company in Britain in the 1920s and the J. C. Williamson Gilbert and Sullivan Opera Company in Australia in the 1930s and 1940s, also becoming a leading light in the Moral Re-Armament spiritual movement in Britain and Australia.

== See also ==
- Listed buildings in Kirkby Ireleth
- Kirkby Moor
- Duddon Estuary
