= Holy Trinity Church, Colton =

Coordinates: 54.2655°N 3.0479°W

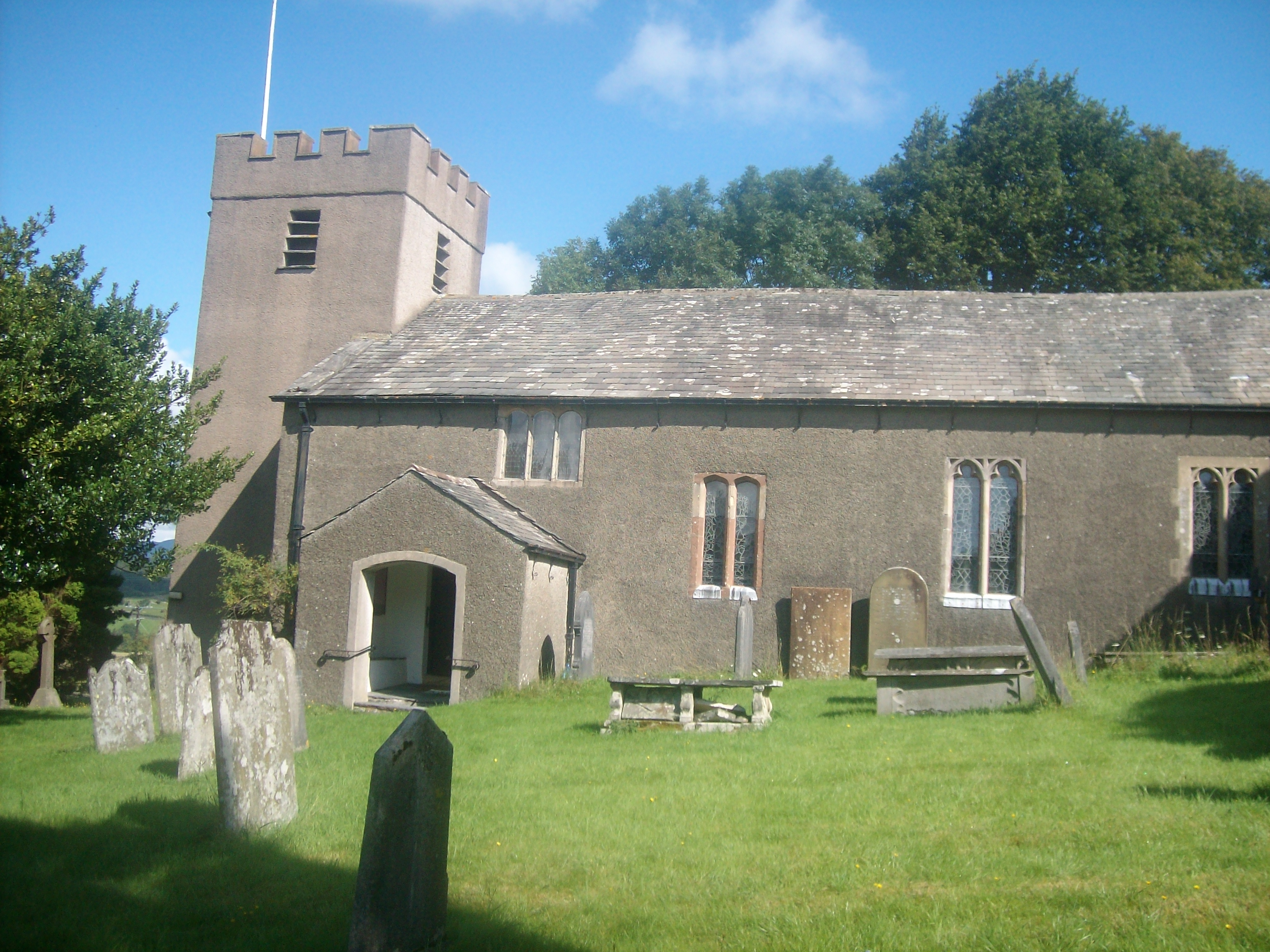
- Holy Trinity Church, Colton, from the south

- Location in Cumbria
- OS grid reference: SD 317,861
- Location: Colton, Cumbria
- Country: England
- Denomination: Anglican
- Website: Holy Trinity, Colton

History
- Status: Parish church
- Consecrated: 1578

Architecture
- Functional status: Active
- Heritage designation: Grade II
- Designated: 23 June 1987
- Architect(s): Paley, Austin and Paley (restoration)
- Architectural type: Church
- Style: Gothic

Specifications
- Materials: Stone, slate roof

Administration
- Province: York
- Diocese: Carlisle
- Archdeaconry: Westmorland and Furness
- Deanery: Furness
- Parish: Colton

Clergy
- Vicar: Revd Brian Streeter

Holy Trinity Church is located to the east of the village of Colton, Cumbria, England. It is an active Anglican parish church in the deanery of Furness, the archdeaconry of Westmorland and Furness, and the diocese of Carlisle. Its benefice has been united with those of St Andrew, Coniston, St Luke, Torver, St Mary the Virgin, Egton-cum-Newland, and St Luke, Lowick. The church is recorded in the National Heritage List for England as a designated Grade II listed building.

== History ==
The church dates from 1578, the year in which it was consecrated. The tower was built in the early part of the 17th century. Holy Trinity became a parish church in 1676, and in 1721 a north transept was added. In 1762 a vestry was built. The church was restored by the Lancaster architects Paley, Austin and Paley in 1890.

== Architecture ==
=== Exterior ===
Holy Trinity is constructed in roughcast stone, with ashlar dressings and a slate roof. Its plan consists of a five-bay nave and chancel in one range, a north transept, a north vestry, and a west tower. The tower contains a small square west window above which are two round-headed windows. The bell openings are plain and straight-headed with louvres. At the summit is an embattled parapet.

=== Interior ===
On the west wall is a painted text reading "DRAW NEAR UNTO GOD", a wall-clock dated 1829, and the Royal arms of George III. The font is plain and dates probably from the 16th century. The memorials include a wall tablet in the transept dated 1775. The authors of the Buildings of England series describe the stained glass as being "unusual". A window in the southwest of the church is by H. Warren Wilson to the memory of Harriet Dickson of Abbotts Reading who died in 1918. It depicts Jacob's dream, Coniston Water, and local birds and flowers. Elsewhere are windows by Gamon and Humphrey to the memory of Arthur Dickson, who died in 1901, depicting Daniel, Saint John, and birds. On the north side of the church is a memorial window to another Arthur Dickson, who died in 1934, including the words of Psalm 150. A further window is to the memory of Revd John Hall, who died in 1958, and shows four scenes from the Parable of the Good Samaritan.

== External features ==
To the west of the church is a water basin. This dates probably from the 16th century, or earlier, and was possibly a holy well. It is designated as a Grade II listed building.

== See also ==
- Listed buildings in Colton, Cumbria
- List of works by Paley, Austin and Paley
