= Colton, Cumbria =

Village and civil parish in Cumbria, England

Coordinates: 54.266°N 3.052°W

Colton
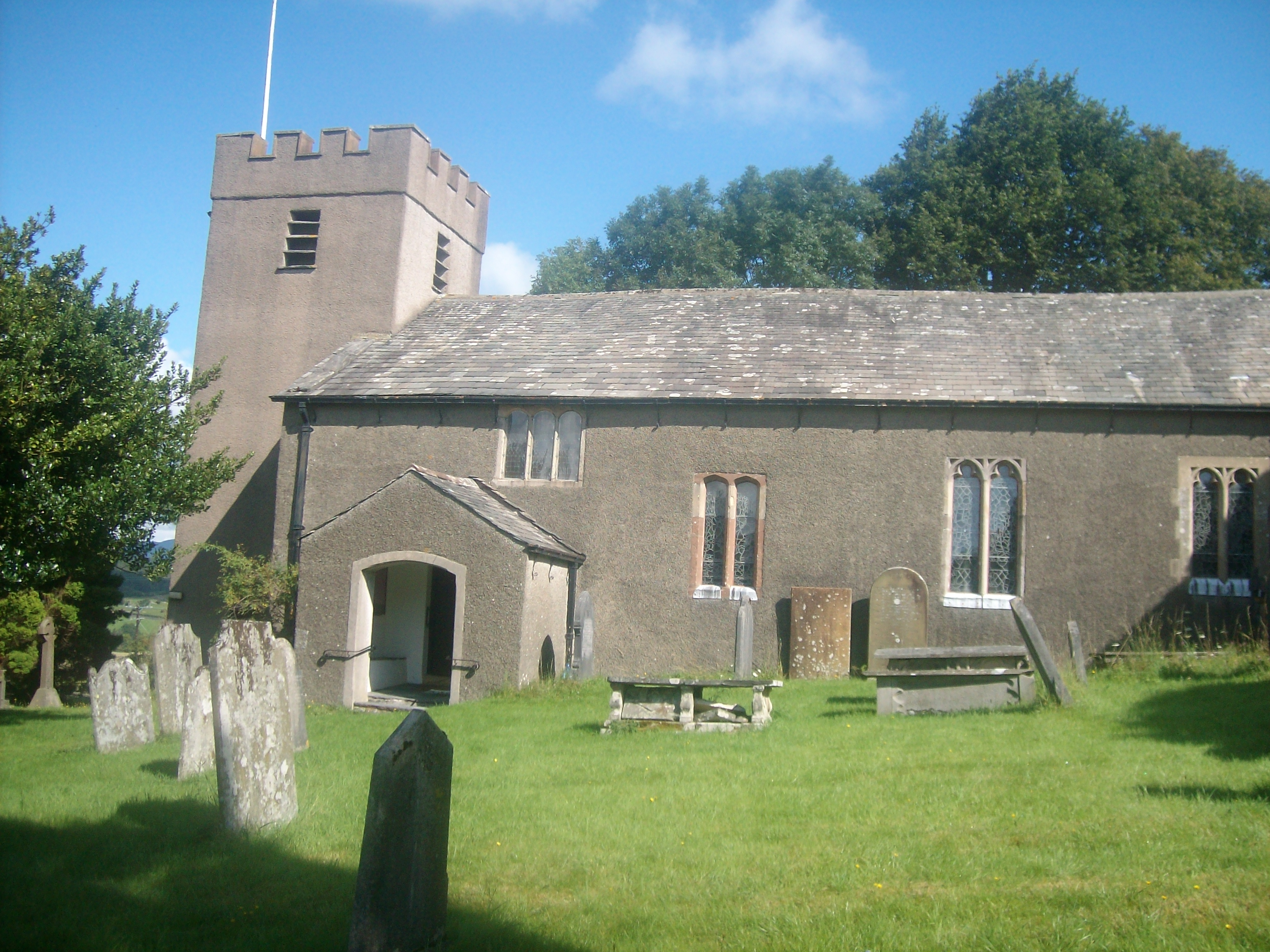
- Colton Church

- Location within Cumbria
- Population: 672 (2011)
- OS grid reference: SD3186
- Civil parish: Colton
- Unitary authority: Westmorland and Furness
- Ceremonial county: Cumbria
- Region: North West
- Country: England
- Sovereign state: United Kingdom
- Post town: ULVERSTON
- Postcode district: LA12
- Dialling code: 01229
- Police: Cumbria
- Fire: Cumbria
- Ambulance: North West
- UK Parliament: Westmorland and Lonsdale

Colton is a village and civil parish in the Westmorland and Furness district of Cumbria, England. In the 2001 census the parish had a population of 765, decreasing at the 2011 census to 672. It was historically part of Lancashire. Its name has been recorded as Coleton (which is Old English for 'village') and Coulton, and its existence has been recorded as early as 1202.

The village is in the historical district of Furness and within the boundaries of the Lake District National Park. It is about 2 km north of the A590 between Newby Bridge and Ulverston.

The settlement is situated on an incline, at the top of which is Colton Church, which was built in 1575 and rebuilt 25 years later. Colton Beck, which runs beside the village, was once known as Cole, meaning 'hazel stream'. Three miles from the village there is an historic Quaker meeting house at Colthouse. The parish includes Finsthwaite, Lakeside, Oxen Park, Nibthwaite, Bouth, and Rusland within its boundaries.

== See also ==
- Listed buildings in Colton, Cumbria
- Holy Trinity Church, Colton
