= Alfred Woodhall =

Royal Air Force officer

Group Captain Alfred Woodhall OBE
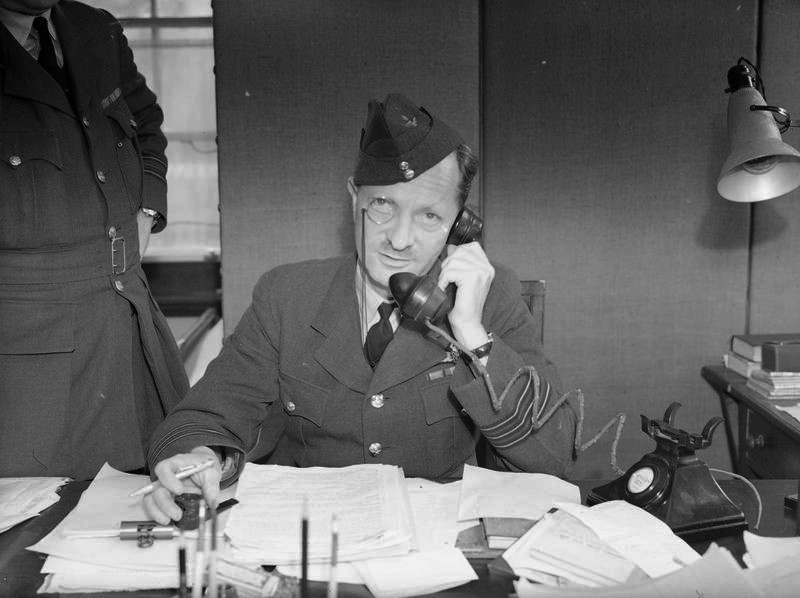
- Woodhall at his desk at Duxford, September 1940
- Born: 9 January 1897; Kirkby-in-Furness, United Kingdom
- Died: 11 June 1968 (aged 71); Dunedin, New Zealand
- Military career
- Allegiance: United Kingdom
- Branch: Royal Marines (1914–1925); Royal Air Force (1925–1945)
- Rank: Group Captain
- Nickname: Woody
- Conflicts: First World War: Battle of the Ancre; Second World War: Battle of Britain; Siege of Malta
- Awards: Officer of the Order of the British Empire; Mention in despatches (twice); Legion of Merit (United States); War Cross (Czechoslovakia)

Group Captain Alfred Basil Woodhall OBE (9 January 1897 – 11 June 1968) was a British senior officer who served in the Royal Air Force (RAF) during the Second World War. He was a senior controller in the Battle of Britain and the Siege of Malta.

Born in Kirkby-in-Furness, Woodhall joined the Royal Marines soon after the commencement of the First World War. As an officer in the Royal Marine Brigade, he served on the Western Front. Injured during the Battle of the Ancre in November 1916, after his recovery he spent the remainder of the war at sea with various vessels of the Royal Navy. In the interwar period, he volunteered to serve as a pilot with the Fleet Air Arm and flew torpedo bombers off aircraft carriers. He transferred to the RAF in 1930 and, after initial service with fighter squadrons, held staff roles until the start of the Second World War. In March 1940, he was appointed a sector controller at Duxford and coordinated the handling of fighter squadrons in the air during the Battle of Britain. He later served as the station commander at Tangmere and as a senior controller on Malta. By the end of the war, he had been made an officer in the Order of the British Empire and had been twice mentioned in despatches. He retired from the RAF in July 1945 and he spent his later years working in civil aviation in New Zealand, where he died at the age of 71.

== Early life ==
Alfred Basil Woodhall was born on 9 January 1897 in Kirkby-in-Furness, in the United Kingdom, and was educated at Bolton Grammar School. He subsequently emigrated to South Africa, where he trained as a mining engineer in Johannesburg. Following the outbreak of the First World War, he found passage back to the United Kingdom as part of the crew of a ship.

== First World War ==
Woodhall joined the Royal Marines and was commissioned as a temporary second lieutenant. After his training was completed, he was posted to the Western Front in France to serve with the Royal Marine Brigade. He was involved in the Battle of the Ancre which commenced on 13 November 1916, but was hospitalised following an injury to his back. Promoted to lieutenant in January 1917, once Woodhall recovered from his injuries, he was sent to serve at sea with ships of the Royal Navy. When the war ended, he was serving on the battleship HMS Agincourt, commanding one of its gun turrets, and was present when the German High Seas Fleet surrendered on 21 November 1918.

== Interwar period ==
Remaining in the Royal Marines after the war, Woodhall subsequently served in the Far East, aboard HMS Hawkins, which was the flagship of the China Station at the time. In 1925 Woodhall responded to a request for volunteers to train as pilots for the Fleet Air Arm (FAA) and was attached to the Royal Air Force (RAF) for a four-year period of service, initially in the rank of flying officer. His flight training commenced at the RAF's No. 1 Flying Training School at Netheravon and in August, after gaining his wings, he went onto Gosport. In January 1926 he was posted to No. 461 (Fleet Torpedo) Flight, also at Gosport.

In August 1927, Woodhall was assigned to the aircraft carrier HMS Eagle, stationed at the island of Malta at the time, as part of No. 460 (Fleet Torpedo) Flight, which operated Blackburn Dart torpedo bombers. The following year he was posted to another aircraft carrier, HMS Courageous as a commander of No. 464 (Fleet Torpedo) Flight, also equipped with Darts. During his time with the FAA, Woodhall executed over 100 landings without ending up in the safety equipment used to prevent aircraft from running off the flight deck and into the sea. This qualified him for the 'Perch Club'. He was promoted to flight lieutenant in July 1929.

Informed that he was to be returned to the Royal Marines on account of being too old for flying duties, Woodhall sought a permanent commission with the RAF. This was granted with effect from 1 August 1930. He was posted to No. 111 Squadron in September, a Fighter Command unit that operated the Armstrong Whitworth Siskin fighter from Hornchurch. In early 1931, he was transferred to No. 54 Squadron; another Hornchurch squadron, this flew the more modern Bristol Bulldog fighter. After three years with Fighter Command, he was employed as a test pilot for the Aeroplane and Armament Experimental Establishment at Martlesham Heath. He later served overseas, firstly with No. 41 Squadron at Aden and then, having been promoted to squadron leader, 824 Naval Air Squadron. He commanded the latter, equipped with Fairey Swordfish torpedo bombers and based on HMS Eagle, during postings in Hong Kong and Singapore. He was taken off flying duties in 1938 after a test, conducted following a minor crash-landing, detected eye problems.

== Second World War ==
In 1939, Woodhall was based at the RAF station at Duxford in a staff role relating to fighter operations. In this capacity he helped develop the Dowding system used by Fighter Command to track aircraft movements over the southeast of England.

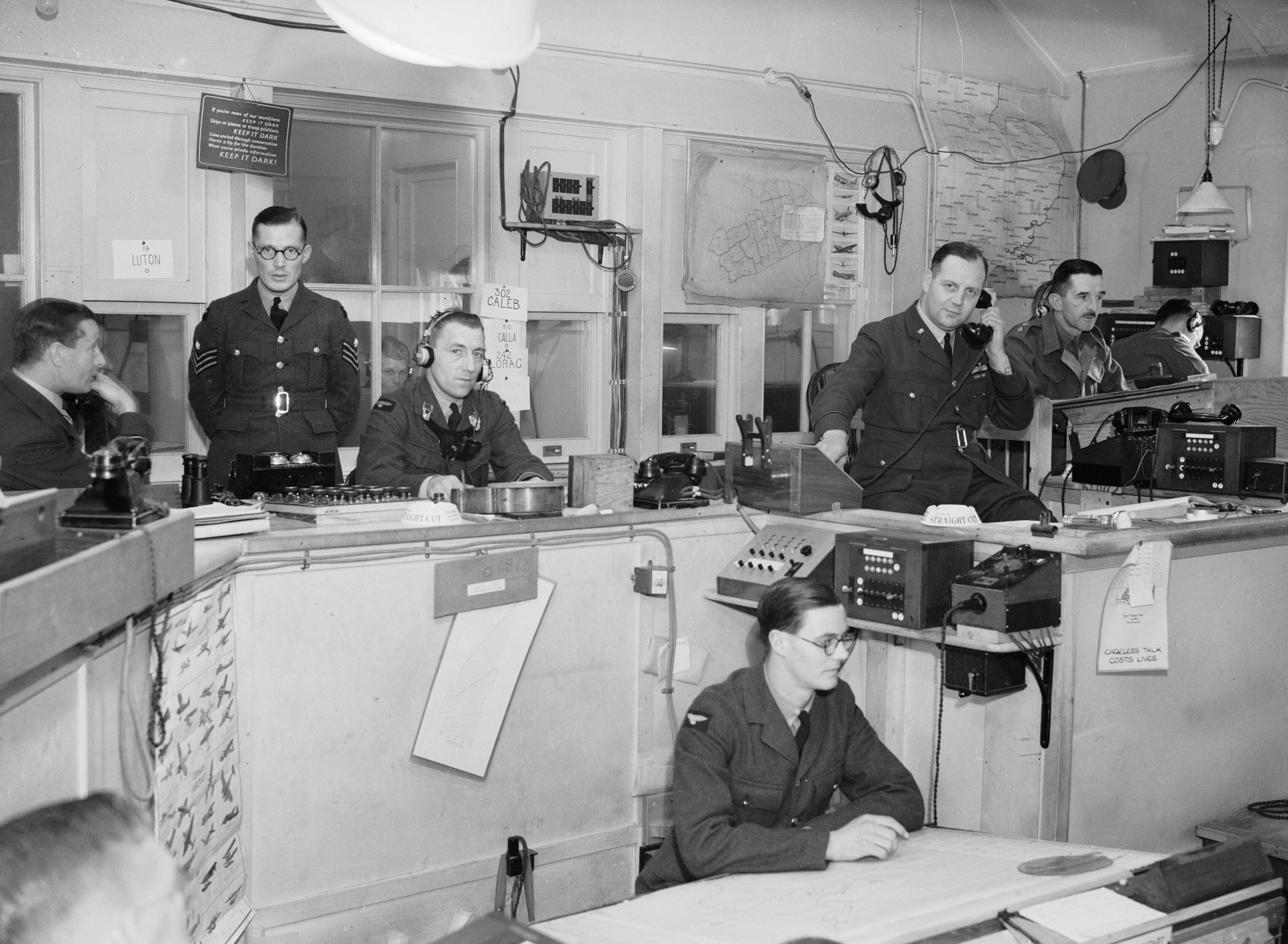
The operations room at Duxford, from which Woodhall oversaw the interception of incoming Luftwaffe bombing raids

=== Battle of Britain ===
Promoted to temporary wing commander on 1 January 1940, three months later Woodhall became commander of the Duxford station. He was also appointed the senior sector controller for No. 12 Group, responsible for directing RAF fighters to intercept incoming Luftwaffe bombing raids. His instructions were important in ensuring that the RAF fighters were optimally positioned to engage the Luftwaffe bombers and their escorts. A familiar and authoritative voice over the radio for fighter pilots taking off on interception duties, he became well known by the nickname 'Woody'. A supporter of Squadron Leader Douglas Bader's Big Wing formation, in early November Woodhall was interviewed by Harold Balfour, the Under-Secretary of State for Air. Balfour's resulting memorandum was critical of Air Chief Marshal Hugh Dowding's leadership of Fighter Command during the Battle of Britain; Dowding considered moving Bader on, but the Chief of Air Staff, Charles Portal, specifically directed that he and Woodhall were not to be punished for expressing their views to Balfour.

During his time at Duxford, Woodhall flew operationally three times as leader of No. 310 Squadron, the flying personnel of which were mostly Czech. This qualified him for the Battle of Britain Clasp, and in January 1941, he was awarded the Czechoslovak War Cross by the Provisional Czechoslovak Government for "valuable services rendered in connection with the war". Later in the year, he was appointed an Officer in the Order of the British Empire, the formal announcement made in The London Gazette on 17 March 1941 noting that this was "in recognition of distinguished services rendered in operational commands of the Royal Air Force".

Promoted to group captain, Woodhall took command of the station at Tangmere on 24 April where he was reunited with Bader, the two having become friends while both were at Duxford. By this time, Fighter Command had switched to offensive operations and were regularly sending the Tangmere Wing to occupied Europe, on bomber escort duties. Woodhall, as sector controller, would often be directing the operations and greeting the returning pilots. He had already instructed that the Tangmere squadrons be relocated to satellite airfields for protection against the air raids that frequently targeted the station. When Bader was lost on operations in August, it was Woodhall who informed his wife; when it was discovered that Bader was a prisoner of war, it was also Woodhall who gave Bader's wife the news.

=== Malta ===
In early 1942, Woodhall was sent to Malta, an important base of operations for the Allies. The island had been under an aerial siege for several months and required an experienced fighter controller to direct the RAF fighters based there. He had limited resources; there were only seven operational Hawker Hurricane fighters at the time of his arrival. He immediately established a basic reserve of fighters to be deployed at regular intervals between the RAF squadrons on the island and instructed that sorties would only be allowed if a minimum of four aircraft were able to take off.

As he did during the Battle of Britain, Woodhall, using information from observers and radar plots, would direct the RAF pilots towards the incoming bombers, endeavouring to place the fighters in the best position to engage them. Tony Holland, a fighter pilot flying at Malta with No. 603 Squadron, later wrote of the boost in morale and confidence to hear Woodhall's directions as the RAF pilots flew to intercept the incoming bombing raids. Another pilot wrote of Woodhall's constant, informative, presence on radio communications but also of his willingness to cede control of tactics to the pilots once the approaching bombers had been spotted. By the middle of the year, the situation on Malta had improved following the arrival of reinforcements in the form of Supermarine Spitfire fighters. These had made an immediate impact and Woodhall was sent back to the United Kingdom.

=== Later war service ===
On his return, Woodhall was posted to Fighter Command headquarters at Bentley Priory in a staff role. He returned to operations in 1944 with a posting to Italy, as commander of a Special Duties Wing. This was based at Brindisi, and operated a variety of aircraft to supply various resistance movements in central and southern Europe. Woodhall was mentioned in despatches for the second time in the King's Birthday Honours of 14 June 1945, and was also presented with a United States honour, the Legion of Merit.

== Later life ==
Woodhall retired from the RAF in July 1945 and moved his family to Canada and then, in 1950, New Zealand. Initially settling in Wellington, he worked for the Department of Civil Aviation. He later moved to Queenstown to work at the aerodrome there before retiring to Dunedin, where he died on 11 June 1968. Survived by his wife and three children, his remains were cremated and scattered at sea.
