= Bouth =

Village in Cumbria, England

Coordinates: 54.261552°N 3.032251°W

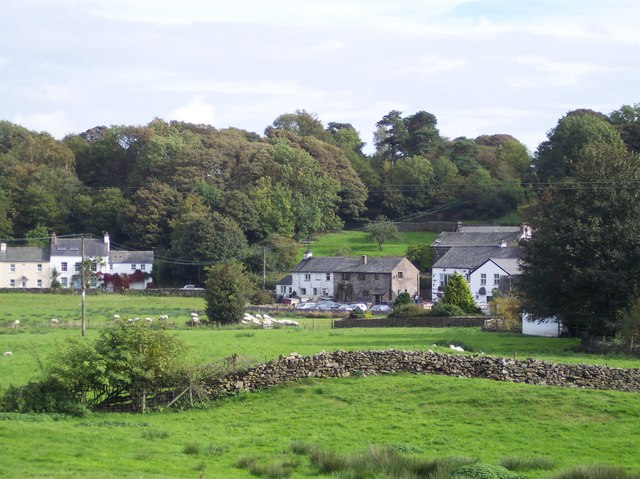
- Bouth

- Location in South Lakeland Location within Cumbria
- OS grid reference: SD3285
- Civil parish: Colton
- Unitary authority: Westmorland and Furness
- Ceremonial county: Cumbria
- Region: North West
- Country: England
- Sovereign state: United Kingdom
- Post town: ULVERSTON
- Postcode district: LA12
- Dialling code: 01229
- Police: Cumbria
- Fire: Cumbria
- Ambulance: North West
- UK Parliament: Westmorland and Lonsdale

Bouth is a village in the Westmorland and Furness district of Cumbria, England. Historically, it was part of the county of Lancashire. It is within the Lake District National Park.

The village's pub, the White Hart, was shown in the short-lived 1990 ITV sitcom Not with a Bang.

== Notable people ==
- Christine McVie of Fleetwood Mac was born in the village.

== See also ==
- Listed buildings in Colton, Cumbria

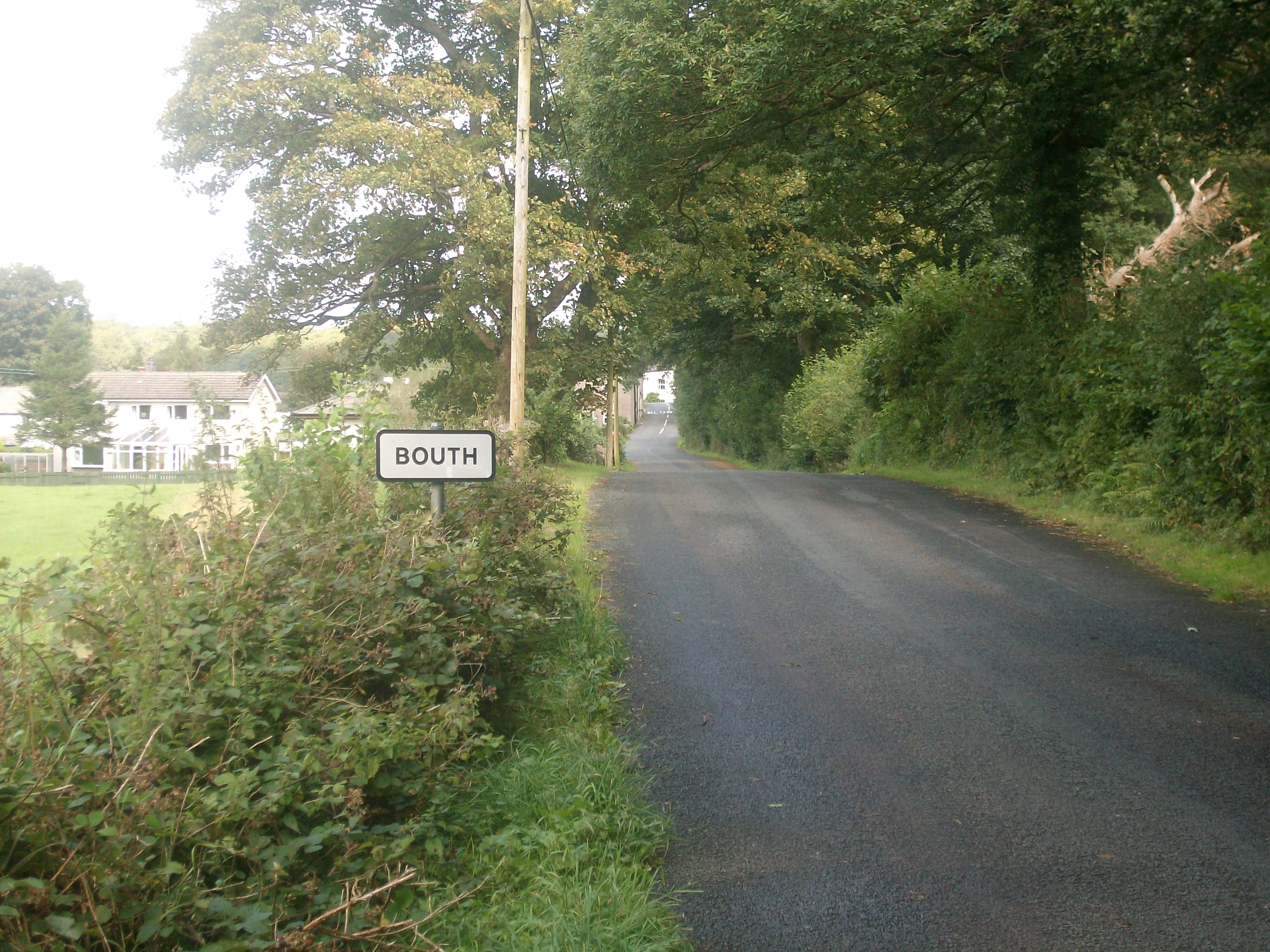
Road into Bouth
