= Singer Improved Family =

Singer Model 15
type	home
manufacturer	Singer Manufacturing Company
material	fabric
stitch	lockstitch
power	treadle, handcrank, add-on electric
feed	drop
needle(s)	one 15x1

The Improved Family, later replaced by the Model 15, is a sewing machine produced by the Singer Manufacturing Company during the 19th century. In 1895, it was replaced by the very similar Model 15. It utilizes an oscillating shuttle, but is otherwise quite similar to the Model 27-series machines.

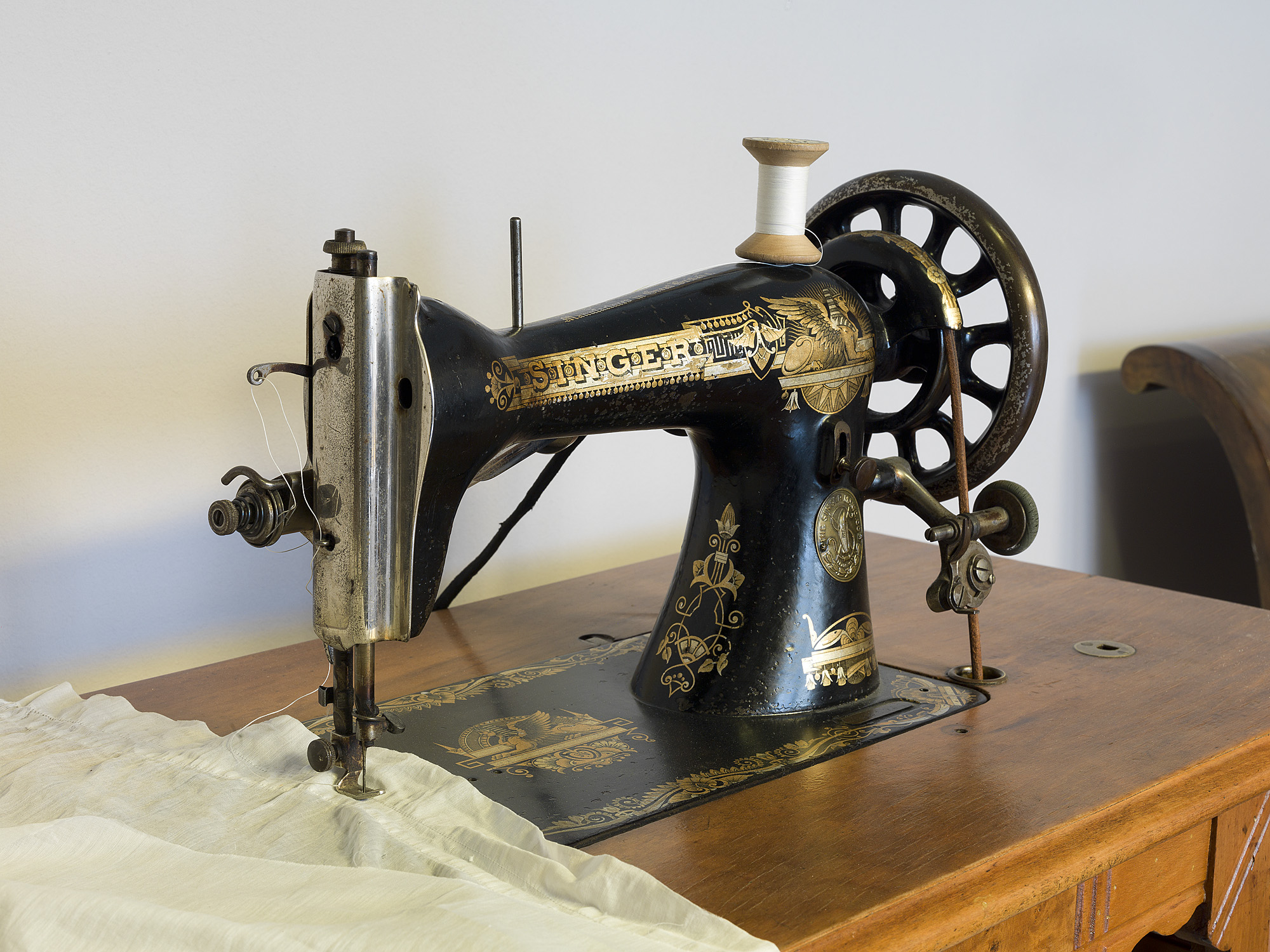
Singer Model 15
