= Haplogroup K2b =

Haplogroup K2b may refer to:

- Haplogroup K2b (Y-DNA)
- Haplogroup K2b (mtDNA), a relatively rare subclade of Haplogroup K (mtDNA)
