= Kirkby Moor =

Moorland area and SSSI in the South Lakeland district of Cumbria, England

Kirkby Moor (Lowick High Common)
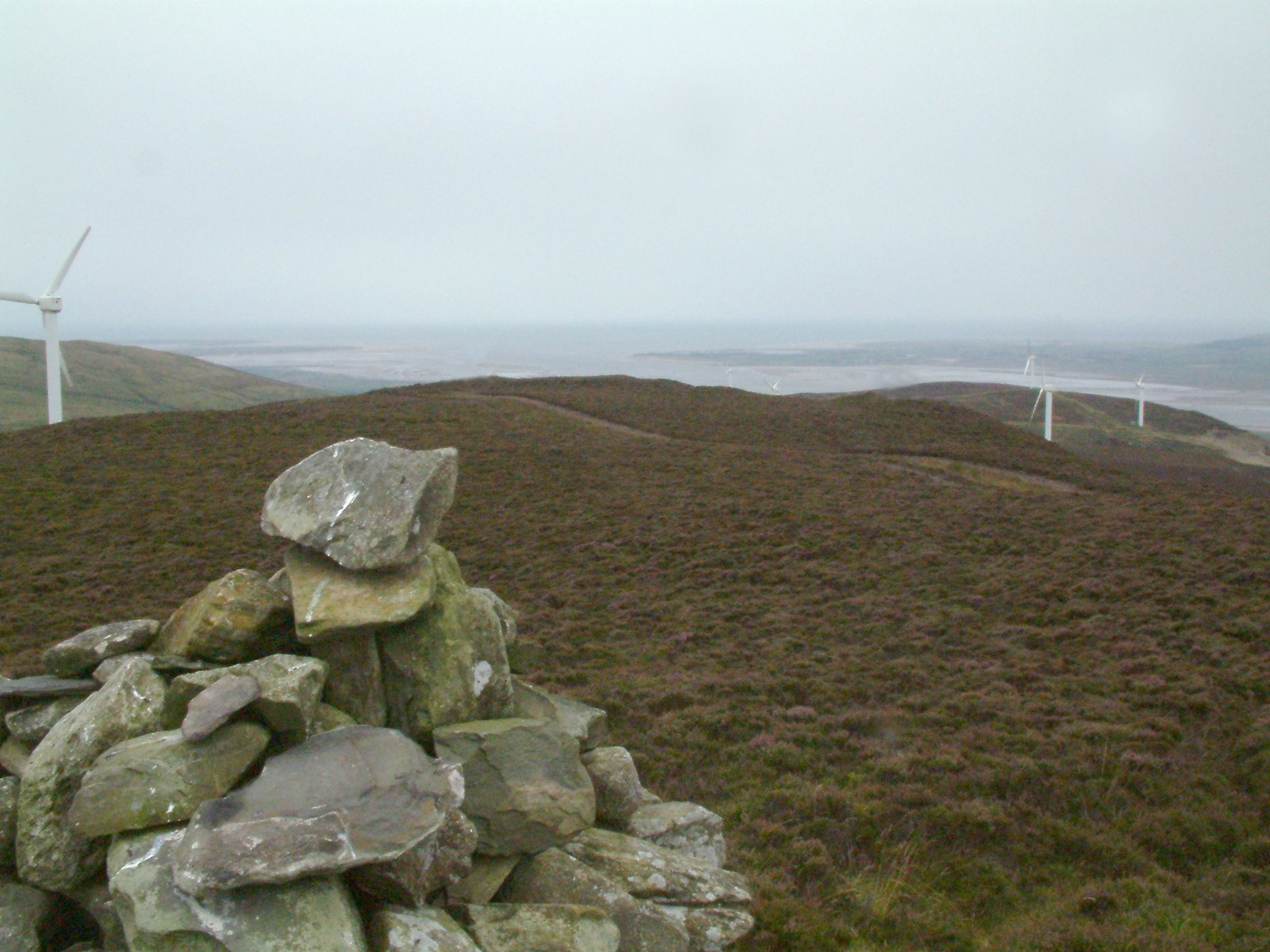
- Duddon Sands and wind turbines from the top of Kirkby Moor

Highest point
- Elevation: 333 m (1,093 ft)
- Prominence: 230 m (750 ft)
- Parent peak: Old Man of Coniston
- Listing: Marilyn
- Coordinates: 54°14′43″N 3°08′19″W

Geography
- Location within the Lake District
- Location: Cumbria, England
- Parent range: Lake District
- OS grid: SD259839
- Topo map: OS Landranger 96

Kirkby Moor is a poorly defined moorland area in southern Cumbria, England, named after the village of Kirkby-in-Furness, but stretching both sides of the A5092 road, and thus spanning the border of the Lake District National Park. The highest area, to the south of the road, and therefore outside the national park, is named Lowick High Common on Ordnance Survey maps. "Kirkby Moor" is more commonly but incorrectly used.

The highest point of Lowick High Common and of Kirkby Moor is 333 m above sea level. The major man-made features are a slate quarry operated by Burlington Slate Ltd and a wind farm consisting of 12 400 kW turbines which is operated by RWE Innogy.

The fell is crossed by several public footpaths, as well as the Kirkby Slate Road, which has a right of access. There are also numerous tracks built across the fell in association with the wind turbines; although notices request walkers to stick to the public rights of way, in practice there is no obstacle to use of the newer tracks, and from 28 May 2005 the land is access land under the Countryside and Rights of Way Act 2000.

The wide range of paths allows for many start points and routes to explore the heather-covered moor.

Since 2018, Lowick Common has been a 106 hectare nature reserve owned by the Cumbria Wildlife Trust. It was gifted to the Trust by Yvonne Miller, a woman from the nearby Lowick Village, who with her husband had bought the land in 1990.

Lowick High Common is the first UK SOTA summit to be activated 100 times.
