= Stott Park Bobbin Mill =

Textile mill museum in Cumbria, England

Coordinates: 54.2855°N 2.9659°W

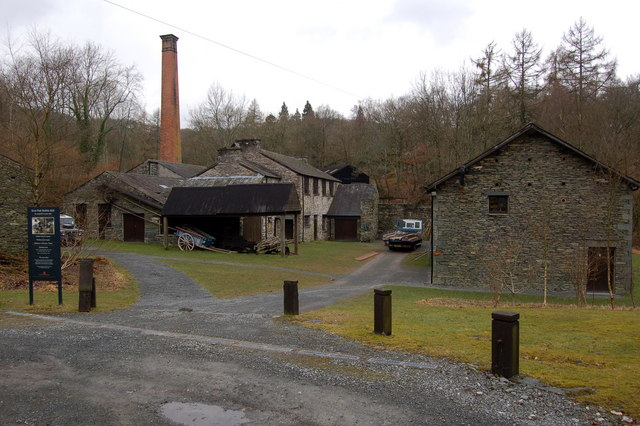
Stott Park Bobbin Mill

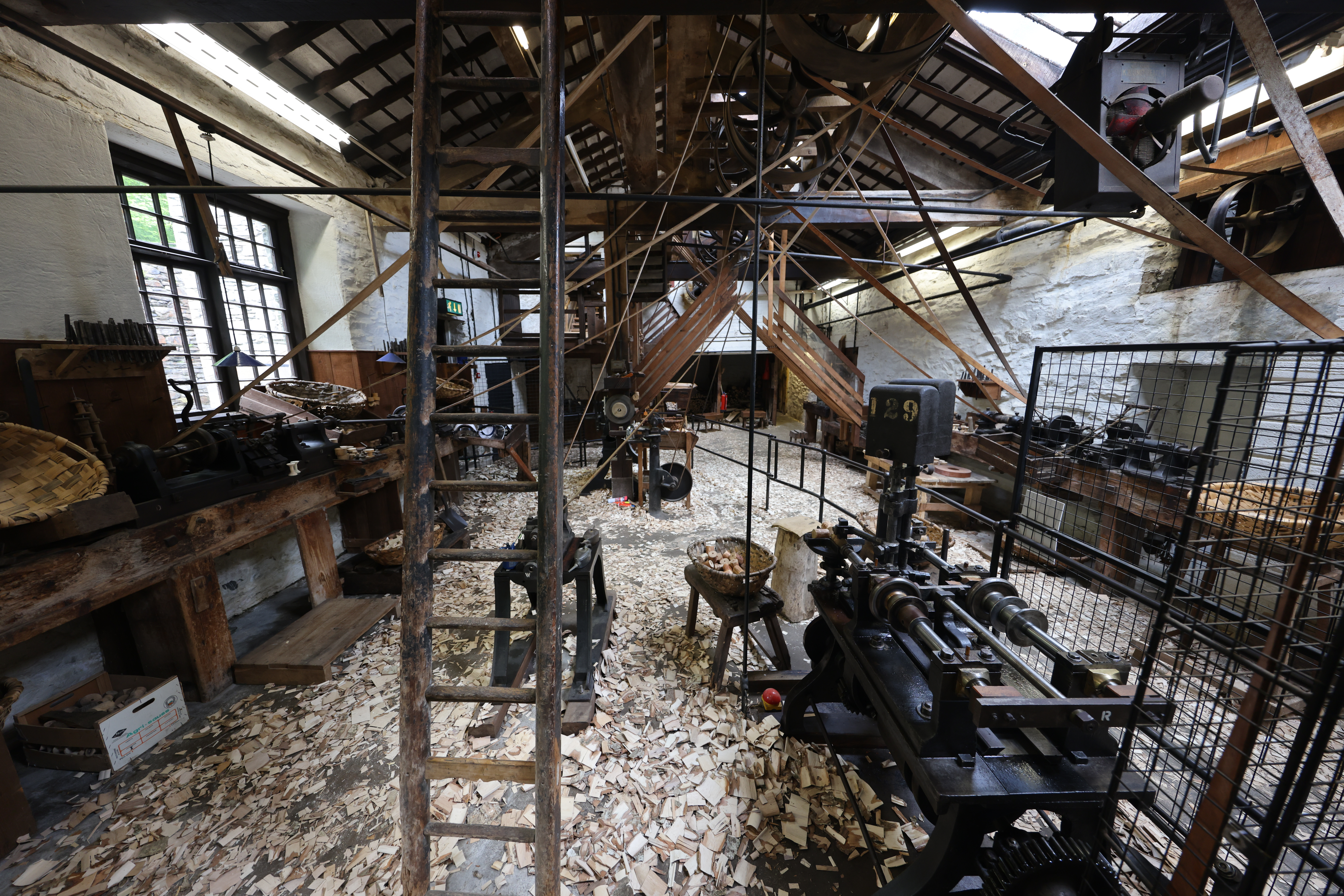
The interior of the mill

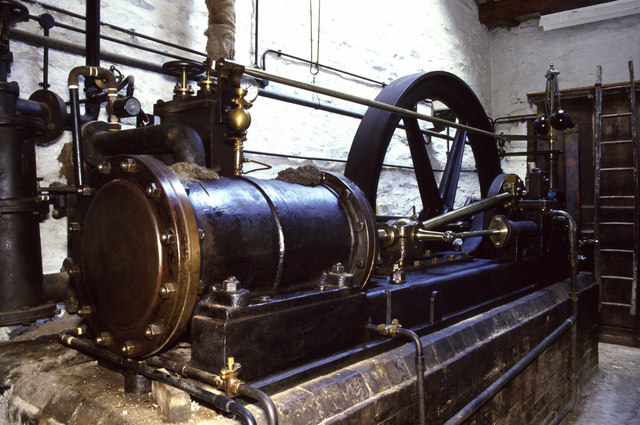
Horizontal steam engine for driving the line shafting in the mill. Built by W Bradley, Gooder Lane Ironworks, Brighouse

Stott Park Bobbin Mill is a 19th-century bobbin mill and now a working museum located near Newby Bridge, Cumbria, England. Built in 1835, the mill was one of over 65 buildings in the Lake District which provided wooden bobbins to the weaving and spinning industry, primarily in Lancashire and Yorkshire. The building is now owned and run by English Heritage.

== History ==
The earliest part of the mill was built in 1835 by John Harrison, a local landowner who had earlier inherited Low Stott Park Farm, including the land on which the mill was built. It is believed to be one of the few mills to have been specifically built for bobbin production, as many other mills were converted from earlier structures. At that time there was a great demand for wooden bobbins from the growing cotton and textile industry, and the Lake District provided a perfect place for bobbin-making due to its abundant natural resources: water for power, and coppiced woodlands for the material to produce the bobbins. Having built the mill as a speculative venture, Harrison and his successors let it out to a string of trustees.

In the 1850s the mill was leased to members of the Coward family, who owned property at Skelwith Bridge near Ambleside and a bobbin mill at Crooklands near Kendal. The family expanded the mill, even when the bobbin industry was threatened by changes in technology and the Cotton Famine of the 1860s and many other Lakeland mills were closing. The construction of the Lakeside railway in 1869, with a station less than a mile away, no doubt made Stott Park a more viable location than others.

The Cowards continued to lease the mill until the 1920s, when they bought it from the Harrison estate for £4,000. They continued to run the business until 1971 when the mill closed, the wood turning industry having declined hugely due to the increase in products made from plastic.

As one of the few remaining bobbin mills in the Lake District, it was listed as a Scheduled Ancient Monument in 1973, and the site was bought by the Department of the Environment in 1974 to safeguard it against demolition or conversion. It passed to the custody of English Heritage in 1983 and was opened as a museum run in conjunction with the Lakes Arts Trust. Today the mill is run solely by English Heritage.

== Power ==
In the early days, the mill was powered by a 24-foot (7.3 m) diameter water wheel. A beck (stream) running from Roger Heights to the west fed a mill pond behind the mill itself. The wheel was later replaced by a water turbine and additional reservoirs were created to provide water, most notably High Dam which is now a popular beauty-spot owned by the Lake District National Park.

In the 1880s a small stationary steam engine built by Bradley's of Brighouse was installed to provide power when the water levels dropped in summer. The engine was run using the waste products from the bobbin-making process and remained in use until electricity was installed in 1941. The mill machinery is still powered by the 1940s electric motor and the steam engine is run for visitors on certain weekends throughout the year.

== Awards ==
In 2014 Stott Park Bobbin Mill was awarded the title of best small visitor attraction at the Cumbria Tourism Awards and went on to win Silver at the national Visit England Awards for Excellence in 2015.

== Toponymy ==
The name Stott Park derives from the Cumbrian dialect word stott meaning a bullock or young ox. The whole area of High Furness belonged to Furness Abbey during the Middle Ages and it is likely that at this time or in the early modern period, land was enclosed as a park to provide pasture for young beef or draught animals.
