= Listed buildings in Whicham =

Whicham is a civil parish in the Cumberland district, Cumbria, England. It contains eleven listed buildings that are recorded in the National Heritage List for England. All the listed buildings are designated at Grade II, the lowest of the three grades, which is applied to "buildings of national importance and special interest". The parish contains the villages or hamlets of Silecroft, Kirksanton, Whicham and Whitbeck and is otherwise rural. The listed buildings comprise houses, farmhouses and farm buildings, two churches, a former brewery, a former mill, and a limekiln.

== Buildings ==
Name and location	Photograph	Date	Notes
St Mary's Church, Whitbeck; 54.24381°N 3.35298°W		Medieval (probable)	The church was heavily restored in 1883, including rebuilding the west front. It is rendered with ashlar dressings, and a slate roof with coped gables. The church consists of a nave and a chancel in a single vessel, and the windows are lancets. At the west end are buttresses, a doorway with a pointed head, two windows and a bellcote on the gable. The east window is a stepped triple lancet.
St Mary's Church, Whicham; 54.23263°N 3.32870°W		12th century (probable)	The east window dates from the 17th century, and the transept was added in 1858. The church is in roughcast stone with ashlar dressings and a slate roof with coped gables. It is in a single vessel, and has a north transept and vestry, and a south porch with a round-headed doorway that is possibly Norman. On the west gable is a bellcote.
Manor House and Manor Cottage; 54.22570°N 3.33569°W	—	17th century (probable)	A pair of roughcast houses with a slate roof. They have two storeys and seven bays. There is one casement window, the others being sashes. At the rear is a continuous outshut, two gabled wings, and a 20th-century dormer.
Townend Hall and outbuildings 54.24407°N 3.35199°W	—	1656	The farmhouse and buildings are in roughcast stone with slate roofs. The house has two storeys, two bays, and a gabled wing with an attic to the left. On the front is a porch with a datestone above, and the windows are casements in plain surrounds. To the right are outbuildings, including a wing on the right with quoins and iron steps leading to an upper floor entrance.
Chappels Farmhouse and barn 54.25218°N 3.28560°W	—	Late 17th or early 18th century	The house and barn are in stone with slate roofs, the barn from a later date. The house has two storeys and two bays, the second bay being taller, and including part of the barn, and there is a single-bay outshut to the right. On the front is one fixed window, the other windows being sashes, and on the barn is a segmental-headed opening and a window. On the southeast front of the barn is a ramp, two-storey outshuts, and a gabled wing with a lean-to outshut.
Stangrah Farmhouse and barns 54.25546°N 3.36317°W	—	1719	The farmhouse and barn are in stone, the farmhouse rendered, and they have slate roofs. The house has two storeys, two bays, and a protruding wing to the right. On the house is a lean-to porch and a datestone, and the wing has a lean-to outshut and the remains of external steps. Most of the windows are casements. The barn to the left contains two segmental entrances, and there is a protruding wing to the left.
Whitbeck Mill; 54.25008°N 3.35562°W		18th century (probable)	The former mill is in stone with a slate roof. It has two storeys and four bays. There are two outshuts and various doorways and windows. On the northeast side is a large narrow wheel in wood and iron in a pit.
Range of buildings, Cross House Farm; 54.22569°N 3.33467°W	—	Early 19th century (probable)	The range of buildings are in stone with a Westmorland slate roof. In the centre is a single-storey cottage, to the left is a former storage area with external stone steps leading to an upper floor doorway, and to the right is a former threshing barn with a cart entrance under a catslide roof. Behind the threshing barn is a former horse engine house. (Note: Street View in April 2011 shows that all the buildings facing the street have been converted for domestic use.)
Bankspring former brewery 54.21966°N 3.32187°W		19th century (probable)	Part of the brewery, now closed, has been converted for domestic use. The buildings are in stone with slate roofs, the house has two storeys and windows of various types. The buildings surround four sides of a courtyard. The central building on the east side has a pyramidal roof, a projection to the south, and round-headed windows. On the north side is a smaller pyramidal roof.
Limekiln; 54.21980°N 3.32291°W	—	19th century (probable)	The limekiln is built into stone in the slope of a hill, it has two fire holes with segmental heads, and a round hole at the top.
War memorial 54.22772°N 3.33188°W	—	1921	The war memorial stands at a road junction in an area enclosed by ornamental iron railings. It is in stone and consists of an obelisk 2.14 metres (7 ft 0 in) high on a two-stepped square plinth. Inscriptions on the obelisk record the names of those lost in the two World Wars, and also of those who served in the First World War. A separate stone commemorates Tom Fletcher Mayson, recipient of the Victoria Cross.

== Notes and references ==
=== Sources ===
- Historic England, "Church of St Mary, Whicham (1336065)", National Heritage List for England (Whitbeck church)
- Historic England, "Church of St Mary, Whicham (1068721)", National Heritage List for England (Whicham church)
- Historic England, "Manor House and Manor Cottage, Whicham (1086596)", National Heritage List for England
- Historic England, "Townend Hall and adjoining outbuildings, Whicham (1068746)", National Heritage List for England
- Historic England, "Chappels Farmhouse and barn, Whicham (1086595)", National Heritage List for England
- Historic England, "Stangrah Farmhouse and attached barns, Whicham (1068727)", National Heritage List for England
- Historic England, "Whitbeck Mill, Whicham (1356132)", National Heritage List for England
- Historic England, "Range of Buildings immediately northeast of Cross House Farmhouse, Whicham (1251990)", National Heritage List for England
- Historic England, "Bankspring former brewery, Whicham (1068594)", National Heritage List for England
- Historic England, "Limekiln immediately to south-west of Bankspring former brewery, Whicham (1086627)", National Heritage List for England
- Historic England, "Whicham and Silecroft War Memorial, Whicham (1457054)", National Heritage List for England
- Historic England, Listed Buildings
- Hyde, Matthew; Pevsner, Nikolaus (2010) [1967], Cumbria, The Buildings of England, New Haven and London: Yale University Press, ISBN 978-0-300-12663-1
