= Minor stations of the Furness Railway =

The Furness Railway and its antecedent companies had at different times a number of halts and non-public timetable stations. Halts were small, unstaffed stations with few, if any, facilities. Non-public timetable stations were stations that did not feature in the publicly advertised railway timetable and were, for example, for internal railway use only or only served by excursion trains rather than regular services.

Name	Grid reference & co-ordinates	Opened	Closed	Line	Preceding station	Next station	Notes
St Bees Golf Club halt	NX 970 107; 54°28′53″N 3°25′28″W	23 July 1910	February 1918	Barrow – Whitehaven	St Bees	Nethertown	Opened for the use of golfers visiting the St Bees golf club in 1910. Closed in February 1918 after the agreement between the golf club and the railway company expired.
Monk Moors Halt	SD 089 925; 54°19′15″N 3°24′6″W	6 December 1897 (1); 1940 (2)	1920 (1); 9 June 1958 (2)	Barrow – Whitehaven	Bootle	Eskmeals	Non public halt used during both World Wars for the use of workers and service personnel engaged at the adjacent Vickers Gun Range. Sometimes incorrectly spelt as Monks Moor.
Whitbeck Crossing halt	SD 115 838; 54°14′35″N 3°21′30″W	1850	1861	Barrow – Whitehaven	Silecroft	Bootle	Short lived station opened and closed by the Whitehaven & Furness Junction Railway before that company was amalgamated into the Furness company. In later years only served by trains on market days in Whitehaven. After closure was used at least once in 1893 to allow people to attend an auction at the nearby Town End Farm.
Kirksanton Crossing halt	SD 142 806; 54°12′54″N 3°19′1″W	1850	1861	Barrow – Whitehaven	Millom	Silecroft	Short lived station opened and closed by the Whitehaven & Furness Junction Railway before that company was amalgamated into the Furness company. In later years only served by trains on market days in Whitehaven.
Under Hill halt	SD 185 828; 54°14′06″N 3°15′2″W	1850	1860	Barrow – Whitehaven	Green Road	Millom	Short lived station opened and closed by the Whitehaven & Furness Junction Railway before that company was amalgamated into the Furness company.
Dunnerholme Gate	unknown	unknown	unknown	Barrow – Whitehaven	Askam	Kirkby-in-Furness	Mentioned in volume 14 of the Regional History of the Railways of Great Britain but no contemporary records.
Salthouse halt	SD 218 688; 54°6′34″N 3°11′49″W	May 1920	1921	Piel branch	Barrow-in-Furness	Rampside	Operated summer Saturdays only for services between Barrow and Piel. Did not open after 1921.
Wraysholme halt	SD 381 753; 54°10′13″N 2°56′55″W	1911	1922	Carnforth – Barrow	Cark and Cartmel	Kents Bank	Non-public station opened 1911 for use by the Territorial Force. Closed c. 1922.
