= Silecroft railway station =

Railway station in Cumbria, England

Silecroft
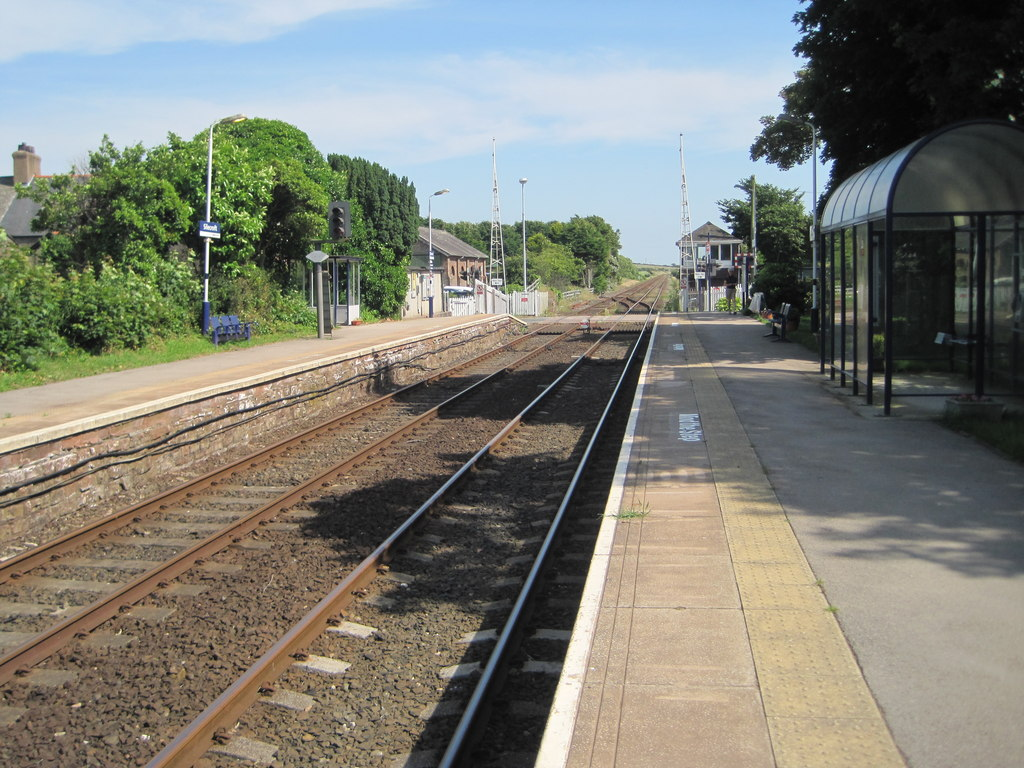

General information
- Location: Silecroft, Cumberland; England
- Coordinates: 54°13′33″N 3°20′04″W
- Grid reference: SD130819
- Owner: Network Rail
- Manager: Northern Trains
- Platforms: 2
- Tracks: 2

Other information
- Station code: SIC
- Classification: DfT category F2

History
- Original company: Whitehaven and Furness Junction Railway
- Pre-grouping: Furness Railway
- Post-grouping: London, Midland and Scottish Railway; British Rail (London Midland Region)

Key dates
- 1 November 1850: Opened

Passengers
- 2021/22: ▲8,800
- 2022/23: ▼8,038
- 2023/24: ▲8,270
- 2024/25: ▼7,644
- 2025/26: ▼7,080
Location
- Location within the former Borough of Copeland Location within Cumbria
Notes
- Passenger statistics from the Office of Rail and Road

Silecroft is a railway station on the Cumbrian Coast Line, which runs between Carlisle and Barrow-in-Furness. The station, situated 19 miles (31 km) north-west of Barrow-in-Furness, serves the villages of Kirksanton and Silecroft in Cumbria. It is owned by Network Rail and managed by Northern Trains.

The station is located to the west of the 1,970 ft (600 m) Black Combe Fell. It was opened, along with the line, on 1 November 1850 by the Whitehaven and Furness Junction Railway.

The railway station was a request stop until December 2023, and one of the many level crossings on this section of the route is controlled from the signal box at its south end.

Some through trains to the Furness Line towards Lancaster stop here.

== Facilities ==
The station is unstaffed, but like many others on this route had a ticket vending machine installed in 2019 to allow passengers to buy tickets before boarding. There are shelters, digital information screens and timetable posters on each platform, along with a telephone for obtaining train running details. Level access is available to both platforms, but these are lower than standard and need portable steps for entry or exit from the train (so the station is not suitable for wheelchair users).

== Services ==
Monday to Saturdays there is generally an hourly request service southbound to Barrow and northbound towards Whitehaven and Carlisle, although there are one or two longer gaps at certain times of day.

A Sunday service was introduced at the May 2018 timetable change, along with additional evening trains on weekdays. The Sunday service is the first to be provided here for more than 40 years.

Preceding station	National Rail	Following station
Bootle	Northern Trains; Cumbrian Coast Line	Millom
	Historical railways	
Bootle	Whitehaven and Furness Junction Railway	Millom
