= Listed buildings in Bootle, Cumbria =

Bootle is a civil parish in the Cumberland district, Cumbria, England. It contains 13 listed buildings that are recorded in the National Heritage List for England. Of these, two are listed at Grade II*, the middle of the three grades, and the others are at Grade II, the lowest grade. The parish contains the village of Bootle and the surrounding countryside. The listed buildings comprise houses and associated structures, churches and associated structures, a school, a station waiting room, and a village cross.

== Key ==
Grade	Criteria
II*	Particularly important buildings of more than special interest
II	Buildings of national importance and special interest

== Buildings ==
Name and location	Photograph	Date	Notes	Grade
Seaton Hall with attached ruins 54.29710°N 3.37294°W		c. 1190	The ruins are those of parts of a Benedictine nunnery. The house was built within the ruins in the 16th century, and was restored in the 19th century. The remains of the east wall of the chancel contain three Early English lancet windows; a part of the south wall also remains. The house is in stone and has a slate roof, two storeys, and a U-shaped plan. The south wing has three bays, and a central doorway with a Tudor arched head. The windows are transomed, or mullioned and transomed.	II*
St Michael's Church; 54.28335°N 3.37291°W		Medieval	Medieval material remains only in the chancel. Alterations, including addition of the transepts, were made in 1837. Building of the tower was started soon after 1850 and it was completed in 1882. The church is in stone, the chancel is roughcast, and the roof is slated. The church consists of a nave, transepts, a chancel with a south organ loft, and a west tower. The tower has angle buttresses, a west doorway above which are two lancet windows and a clock face, a canted stair turret to the north with a hipped roof and a small dormer, louvred bell openings, a Lombard frieze, a coped parapet with pinnacles, and a pyramidal roof with a cross.	II
Sundial; 54.28317°N 3.37292°W	—	18th century (probable)	The sundial is in the churchyard of St Michael's Church, and stands on an earlier base. It is in ashlar stone, on three high round steps, and has a plain baluster shaft. The plate is missing.	II
Eskmeals; 54.32918°N 3.39979°W	—	1761	Additions were later made to the house, which is roughcast with ashlar dressings and slate roofs with coped gables. There are two storeys, in the centre is a three-bay block with a rear wing, to the north is a recessed two-bay extension, and to the south a lower and recessed two-bay extension with a lean-to and a single-storey service wing. The windows are sashes. In the centre is a gabled porch with angle pilasters and a doorway with a moulded surround and a pediment.	II
Swallowhurst and barns 54.30684°N 3.38020°W	—	1770	The buildings are in stone, and consist of a house with flanking barns at right angles. The house is roughcast and has a slate roof with coped gables. It has two storeys, a central block of three bays, flanked by lower two-storey extensions. The central doorway has a porch with an elliptical head and an archivolt, and above it is a datestone. The windows are replacement casements. The barns project to the front, they have roofs of concrete tiles, the barn to the left has ventilation slits, and the other barn is roughcast.	II
The Nook; 54.30384°N 3.39803°W	—	Late 18th century	A roughcast stone house with ashlar dressings, quoins, two string courses, a frieze, a cornice, and a roof of concrete tiles. There are two storeys and three bays, with a small rear wing. The central entrance has a moulded architrave, flat pilasters, and a broken pediment surmounted by an urn. The windows are 20th-century casements with plain surrounds.	II
Shaw Monument; 54.28312°N 3.37312°W	—	1780	The monument consists of a headstone, and stands by the wall in the churchyard of St Michael's Church. It is in ashlar, and has a broken segmental pediment with paterae and floral drops at the ends and on the sides, and an urn. It is inscribed with the names of three members of the Shaw family.	II
United Reformed Church and two houses 54.28143°N 3.37192°W	—	1780	The chapel is stuccoed on a moulded plinth, with reeded pilaster strips, a cornice, and a slate roof, hipped at the east end. The east front has two storeys, a central entrance and windows, those in the upper floor round-headed. On the north front are three round-headed windows. Attached to the west are two two-storey houses, one with two bays, the other with three. They are roughcast, with sash windows, and each house has a dated lintel, the later dated 1808.	II*
3 Main Street; 54.28184°N 3.37176°W	—	Early 19th century	A house and shop, roughcast with ashlar dressings, in two storeys and three bays. The windows are sashes with architraves, and there is a shop window with a panelled apron, flat pilasters, a frieze, a cornice, and small panes. There are two entrances with plain surrounds; the left entrance has a tympanum with an archivolt, and the right entrance has a fanlight above the door.	II
Captain Shaw's Primary School; 54.28181°N 3.37206°W		1830	The school is in stuccoed stone on a moulded plinth, with quoins, a cornice, a coped parapet, and a slate roof with coped gables. There are two storeys with five bays on the front and two in the side. The windows have two lights, double-chamfered mullions, and hood moulds. On the side are two entrances with four-centred arches, and a plaque incised with biblical quotations. At the rear is a flat-roofed wing, an outshut, and a linked shed with a gable opening for a bell.	II
Waiting room, Bootle station 54.29115°N 3.39400°W	—	1874	The station waiting room has a red sandstone plinth, it is timber framed and clad in weatherboarding, and has a double-pitched slate roof with overhanging eaves. There are four bays, the middle two bays open fronted, an enclosed ladies' waiting room at the south end, a larger, partly open fronted three-bay waiting room, and at the rear the remains of a toilet.	II
Signal Box; 54.29143°N 3.39404°W		1874	The signal box was built for the Furness Railway. It has a sandstone base, glazed on three sides, and has a hipped Welsh slate roof with ridge tiles. On the north side are modern external steps. Inside is a London Midland Region lever frame of 15 levers installed in 1977.	II
Village Cross; 54.28302°N 3.37299°W		1897	The cross stands on the site of the former market cross. Designed by Austin and Paley, it is in ashlar, and stands on three steps. The cross has a tapering base, and consists of a plain shaft and a Celtic round head. On the base is a plaque recording the Diamond Jubilee of Queen Victoria and the dates of two market charters.	II
