= Whicham =

Hamlet and civil parish in Cumbria, England

Coordinates: 54.246°N 3.335°W

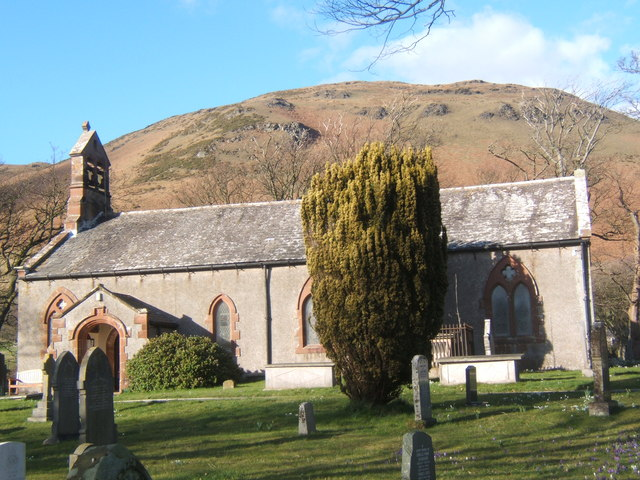
- St Mary's Church, Whicham, from the south

- Location in Copeland Borough Location within Cumbria
- Population: 382 (2011 census)
- Civil parish: Whicham
- Unitary authority: Cumberland
- Ceremonial county: Cumbria
- Region: North West
- Country: England
- Sovereign state: United Kingdom

Whicham is a hamlet and civil parish in Cumberland, Cumbria, England. At the 2011 census the parish had a population of 382. The parish includes the villages of Silecroft and Kirksanton and the hamlets of Whicham and Whitbeck. Whicham was recorded in the Domesday Book as Witingham.

The parish has an area of 3,807.2 hectares (9,408 acres). It lies north of Millom on the west coast of Cumbria. The A595 road crosses it from north east to south west, near the south east border, coming from Broughton in Furness to a junction with the A5093 road, and then from south to north near the coast, towards Ravenglass and Whitehaven. The parish includes the hill Black Combe with a height of 600 metres (2,000 ft), one of Alfred Wainwright's "Outlying Fells". The Cumbrian Coast Line railway follows the coast of the parish, with a station at Silecroft. The parish absorbed Whitbeck parish on 1 April 1934.

There is a parish council, the lowest level of local government.

== Listed buildings ==
There are ten listed buildings in the parish: all at grade II, and including two churches (St Mary's Church, Whicham and St Mary's Church, Whitbeck), a limekiln and a former brewery.
