= Hycemoor =

Hamlet in Cumbria, England

Coordinates: 54.291°N 3.393°W

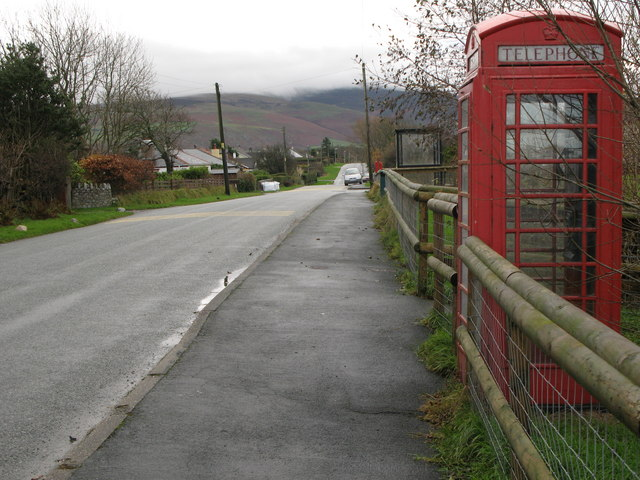
- A red telephone box in Hycemoor in 2006

- Location in Copeland Borough Location within Cumbria
- OS grid reference: SD093892
- Civil parish: Bootle
- Unitary authority: Cumberland
- Ceremonial county: Cumbria
- Region: North West
- Country: England
- Sovereign state: United Kingdom
- Post town: MILLOM
- Postcode district: LA19
- Dialling code: 01229
- Police: Cumbria
- Fire: Cumbria
- Ambulance: North West
- UK Parliament: Barrow and Furness

Hycemoor is a hamlet in the Cumberland district of the county of Cumbria, in North West England.

== Location ==
It is located on a minor road about a mile away from the village of Bootle and the A595 road. The nearest railway station is in the neighbouring hamlet of Bootle Station.
