= Tom Fletcher Mayson =

English Victoria Cross recipient (1893-1958)

- Born: 3 November 1893; Silecroft, Millom, Cumberland
- Died: 21 February 1958 (aged 64); Barrow-in-Furness, Lancashire
- Burial place: St Mary's Churchyard, Whicham
- Military career
- Allegiance: United Kingdom
- Branch: British Army
- Rank: Lance sergeant
- Units: The King's Own (Royal Lancaster) Regiment
- Conflicts: First World War: Battle of Passchendaele; Battle of Pilckem Ridge
- Awards: Victoria Cross

Tom Fletcher Mayson VC (3 November 1893 – 21 February 1958) was an English recipient of the Victoria Cross, the highest and most prestigious award for gallantry in the face of the enemy that can be awarded to British and Commonwealth forces. He was awarded the VC for actions during the Battle of Pilckem Ridge of the Battle of Passchendaele.

== Details ==
He was 23 years old, and a Lance-Sergeant in the 1/4th Battalion, The King's Own (Royal Lancaster) Regiment (part of the 55th (West Lancashire) Division), British Army during the First World War when the following deed took place for which he was awarded the VC.

On 31 July 1917 at Pilckem Ridge, Wieltje Salient, Belgium, when his platoon was held up by machine-gun fire, Lance-Sergeant Mayson, without waiting for orders, at once made for the gun which he put out of action with bombs, wounding four of the team; the remaining three of the team fled, pursued by Lance-Sergeant Mayson to a dug-out where he killed them. Later, when clearing up a strongpoint, this NCO again tackled a machine-gun single-handed, killing six of the team. Finally during an enemy counterattack he took charge of an isolated post and successfully held it until ordered to withdraw and his ammunition was exhausted.

== The Medal ==
His Victoria Cross was on loan to Whicham Church from where it was given to the Kings Own Royal Regimental Museum. in Lancaster, Lancashire

== Bibliography ==
- Snelling, Stephen (2012) [1998]. Passchendaele 1917. VCs of the First World War. The History Press. ISBN 978-0752476667.
- Whitworth, Alan (2015). VCs of the North: Cumbria, Durham & Northumberland. Pen and Sword Books. ISBN 978-1473848221.
