= Silecroft =

Village in Cumbria, England

Coordinates: 54.225°N 3.334°W

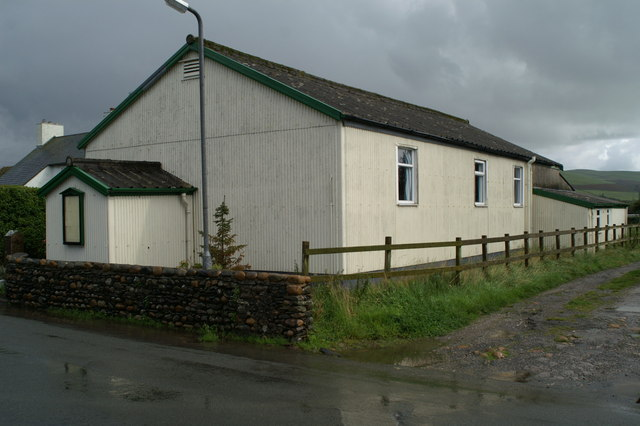
- The Village Hall, Silecroft

- Location in Copeland Borough Location within Cumbria
- OS grid reference: SD129819
- Civil parish: Whicham
- Unitary authority: Cumberland
- Ceremonial county: Cumbria
- Region: North West
- Country: England
- Sovereign state: United Kingdom
- Post town: MILLOM
- Postcode district: LA18
- Dialling code: 01229
- Police: Cumbria
- Fire: Cumbria
- Ambulance: North West
- UK Parliament: Barrow and Furness

The village of Silecroft in Cumbria, England, is in the parish of Whicham. It is situated between the towns of Millom and Bootle, and also neighbours the towns/villages of Haverigg, Kirksanton and Whitbeck.

The village is located just within the Lake District National Park.

Travelling by road, Silecroft is 3.7 miles (6.0 km) to the north of Millom, 23.7 miles (38.1 km) to the north of Barrow in Furness, and 29.2 miles (47.0 km) to the south of Whitehaven.

== Black Combe ==
Black Combe, is a fell near Silecroft, which on clear days has views of Ireland, Scotland, Wales, Isle of Man, nearby is White Combe. The main walking route is from St Mary's Church, Whicham, the routes up the hill are well-trodden and easy to follow.. Black Combe is 1,970 feet (600m) high and stands in isolation, some 10 miles (16 km) away from any higher ground; this factor offers an excellent all-round panoramic view of land and sea; weather permitting.

== Silecroft railway station ==
Silecroft has its own railway station, a request stop on the scenic Cumbrian Coast Line.

== Governance ==
Silecroft is in the parliamentary constituency of Barrow and Furness.

Silecroft does not have its own parish council; instead it's part of Whicham Parish Council.
