= Rampside railway station =

Disused railway station in Cumbria, England

Coordinates: 54.0842°N 3.1726°W

Rampside railway station was located on the Piel Branch of the Furness Railway in the Rampside area of Barrow-in-Furness, England.

The single platform station opened from 24 August 1846 as Concle, being renamed Rampside in 1869. The station remained operational until 1936 when it closed along with the following station at Piel, which had been reachable via the Roa Island Causeway. The station building and entire branch line had been demolished by the 1980s.

== Sources ==
- Robinson, Peter W. (2002). Cumbria's Lost Railways. Catrine: Stenlake Publishing. ISBN 978-1-84033-205-6.

Preceding station	Historical railways	Following station
Salthouse Halt	Furness Railway	Piel
