= Piel railway station =

Disused railway station in Cumbria, England

Coordinates: 54.0749°N 3.1752°W

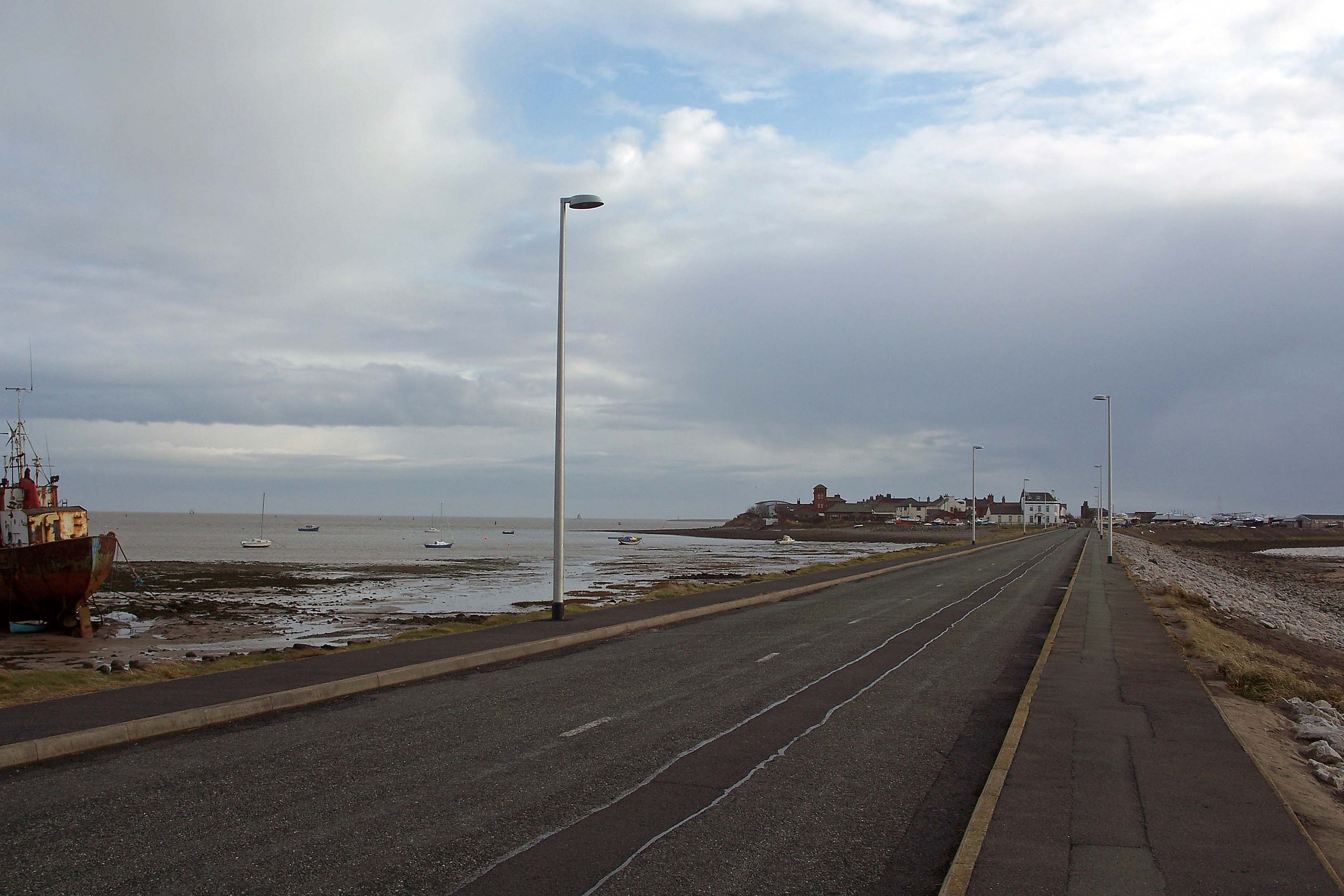
The Roa Island causeway originally carried the rail line to Piel station

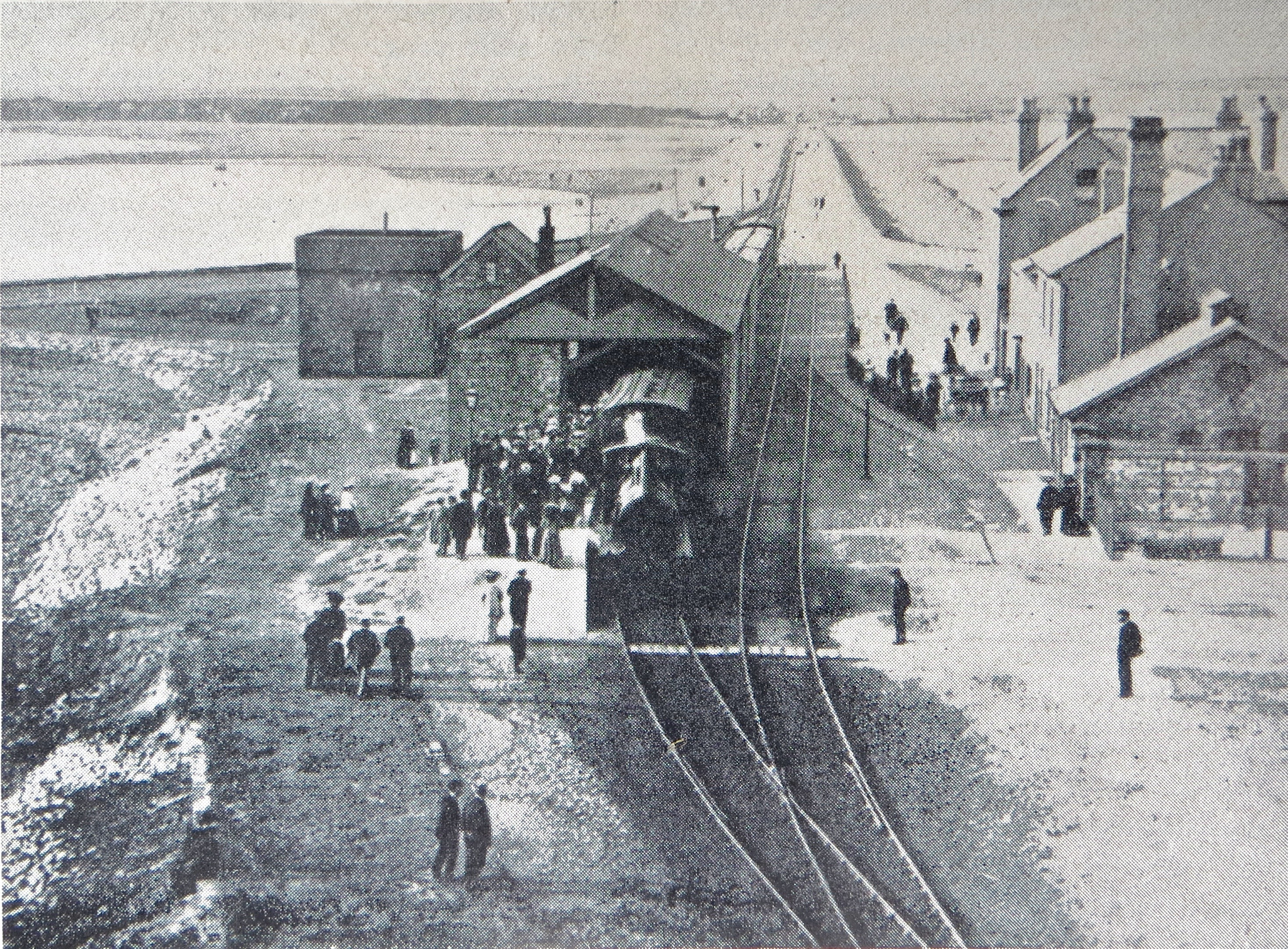
1882 Piel station about 1900. Demolished 1936.

Piel railway station was the terminus of the Furness Railway's Piel Branch in Barrow-in-Furness, England that operated between 1846 and 1936. Located on Roa Island it was built to serve the passenger steamers at Piel Pier. The Roa Island causeway was specifically constructed for the railway, in turn making the island part of the British mainland. The station and the Piel Branch line have both been demolished, however the Roa Island Hotel which was built adjoining the station survives to this day as a Grade II listed building.

== History ==
The Roa Island article covers the early history of this end of the 15 mi (24 km) line to Dalton-in-Furness (the southern end of the Cumbrian Coast Line). When the Furness joined up with the Lancaster and Carlisle Railway in 1857, the ferry to the Preston and Wyre Joint Railway was no longer needed, but the Midland Railway moved their shipping services when the Furness and Midland Joint Railway opened. From 1 July 1867 the 10am Midland train from Leeds connected with Isle of Man steamer and, from September, to Belfast. The steamers transferred to Ramsden Dock from 1881, but local trains continued from Platform 3 at Barrow Central, running via the 1873 curve at Salthouse Junction until closure in July 1936.

Preceding station	Historical railways	Following station
Rampside	Furness Railway	Terminus
