= Seaton Priory =

Former nunnery in Bootle, Cumbria, England

Coordinates: 54.297187°N 3.372929°W

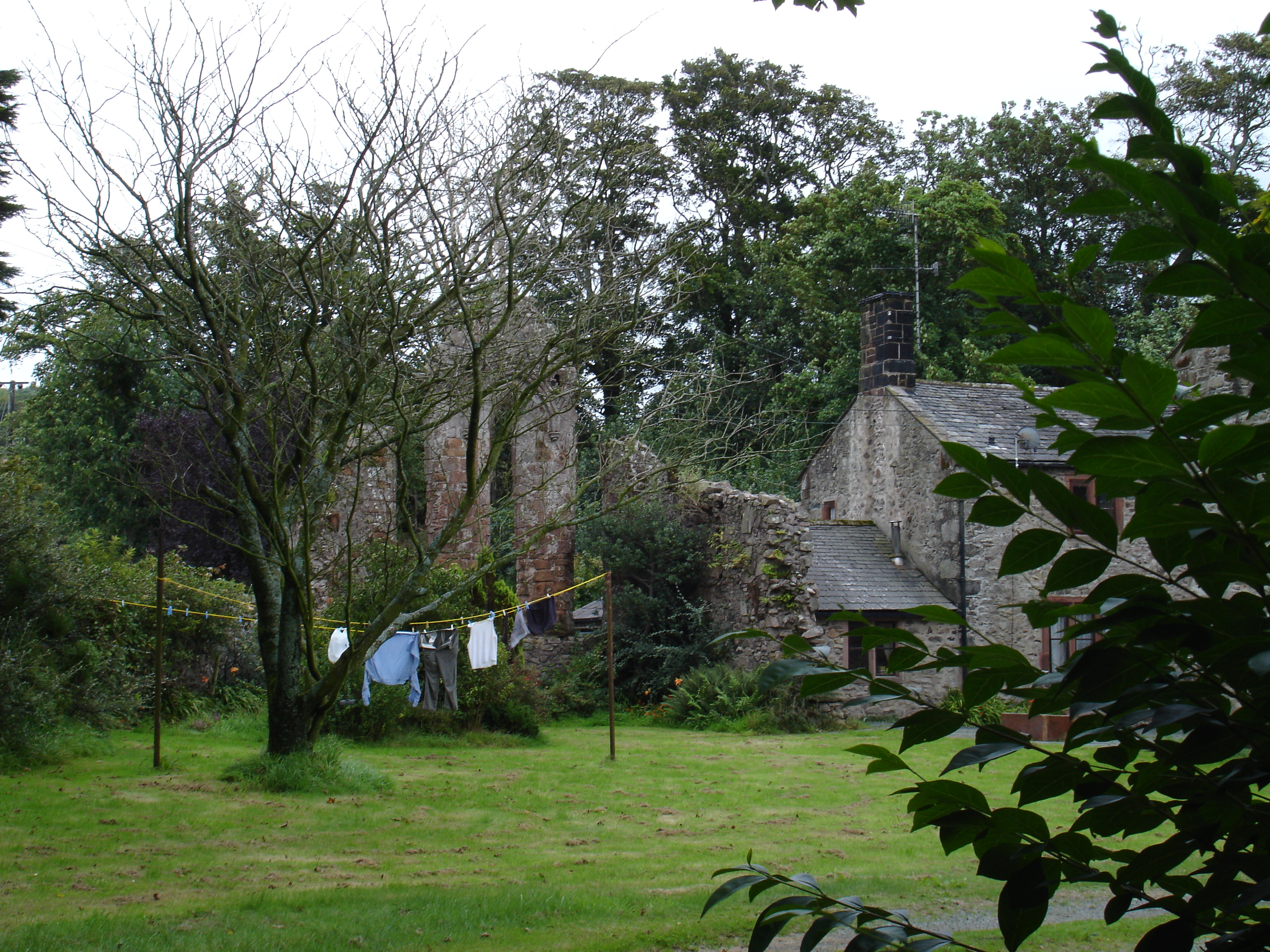
- Seaton Priory
- Interactive map of Seaton Priory

Monastery information
- Full name: The Priory of the Blessed Virgin Mary
- Other names: Lekeley Priory, Seton Priory
- Order: Benedictine
- Established: Late 12th Century
- Disestablished: 1537-42 approx
- Diocese: Carlisle

People
- Founders: Henry de Boyville, 4th Lord of Millom

Site
- Location: Bootle, Cumbria, England
- Visible remains: One major wall with three lancet windows and two smaller walls.
- Public access: No

Originally called the nunnery of Lekeley from the name of the land it was built upon, the former nunnery of Seaton is to the north of the parish of Bootle, Cumbria, England.

== Early life ==
The nunnery was founded at Lekeley by Henry de Boyville, grandson of Godard de Boyville, Lord of Millom, in circa 1190. It was dedicated to the Blessed Virgin and its nuns followed the Benedictine Rule. The nunnery was never prosperous, in common with other religious associations of women in the region, due to the unsettled nature of the area caused by the proximity to the Scottish border.

In 1227, Archbishop Walter Gray granted the appropriation of the church of St. Michael of Irton to the prioress and convent of Lekeley to alleviate their poverty. Later, in 1357, Henry, Duke of Lancaster, granted the appropriation of the hospital of St. Leonard, Lancaster, to assist the house. The abbey of Holmcultram also helped the nuns. In 1459, Thomas York, abbot of Holmcultram, leased all the lands the abbey possessed between the Rivers Esk and Duddon called Lekeley, to Elizabeth Croft, prioress, for 12 years at an annual rent of twenty shillings.

== Sculptural remains ==
Very little remains of the Priory. The east end of what appears to be the chancel, with three gothic lancet windows survives. A fragment of what appears to have been the tombstone of a prioress was built into the wall of a barn at High Hyton not far from the nunnery. Most of the tombstone has been lost, but the remaining inscription reads: + HIC IACET . . . DENTONA AN . . . From the charges made in 1536 by Layton and Legh, Joan Copland was the prioress at that date and that Susanna Rybton was an inmate of the house. We can only guess as to when the tombstone dates from.

== Dissolution ==
The total revenue of the nunnery in 1535 was returned at £13 17s. 4d. The date of dissolution is not known, but by 1537, Sir Hugh Askew had the lease of the Priory lands. An attempt was made, when the northern counties rose in rebellion, to oust him and restore the nuns to their old home. A house, Seaton Hall, was built into the ruins and still stands today.

== Known Prioresses of Seton ==
Elizabeth Croft, occurs 1459

Joan Seaton, occurs 1535

Joan Copland, occurs 1536
