= Cleator and Furness Railway =

UK railway line

Cleator and Furness Railway Act 1866
- Act of Parliament
- Parliament of the United Kingdom
- Long title: An Act to empower the Whitehaven and Furness Junction Railway Company and the Whitehaven, Cleator, and Egtemont Railway Company to make a Railway from Egremont to Sellafield in the County of Cumberland; to raise further Capital; and for other Purposes.
- Citation: 29 & 30 Vict. c. cxxxii

Dates
- Royal assent: 28 June 1866

Coverage of railway; Egremont - Beckermet - Sellafield.

In 1864 it was proposed to extend the Whitehaven, Cleator and Egremont Railway's line that ran from Moor Row to Egremont and by doing so extend it to Sellafield with a section of new railway. The act of Parliament for this new railway, the Cleator and Furness Railway Act 1866 (29 & 30 Vict. c. cxxxii), was obtained in June 1866 and it was to be known as the Cleator and Furness Railway. When proposed the line would connect with the Whitehaven and Furness Junction Railway but soon afterwards, the W&FJR became part of the Furness Railway. The railway would open as the joint properties of the Furness Railway and the Whitehaven, Cleator and Egremont Railway.

It was worked by the WC&ER until the company sold out to the London and North Western Railway when the FR disputed the purchase. In 1866 the London and North Western Railway purchased two small railways in West Cumberland and the Furness Railway insisted the former company expanded no further in the Whitehaven area. An agreement was reached and it was this agreement that the Furness Railway maintained had been ignored when in 1878 the London and North Western Railway purchased the WC&ER lines. The following year an agreement was reached where the WC&ER would become the joint property of the Furness Railway and the London and North Western Railway after which the Cleator and Furness Railway became part of the LNWR and FR Joint Lines.

== See also ==
- Furness Railway
- London & North Western Railway
- Whitehaven, Cleator and Egremont Railway.

== Sources ==
Rush, R.W. (1973). The Furness Railway. Oakwood Press. ISBN 0853611173.
