= Co-operative Building, Barrow-in-Furness =

Former department store in Barrow-in-Furness, Cumbria, England

Coordinates: 54.1157°N 3.2279°W

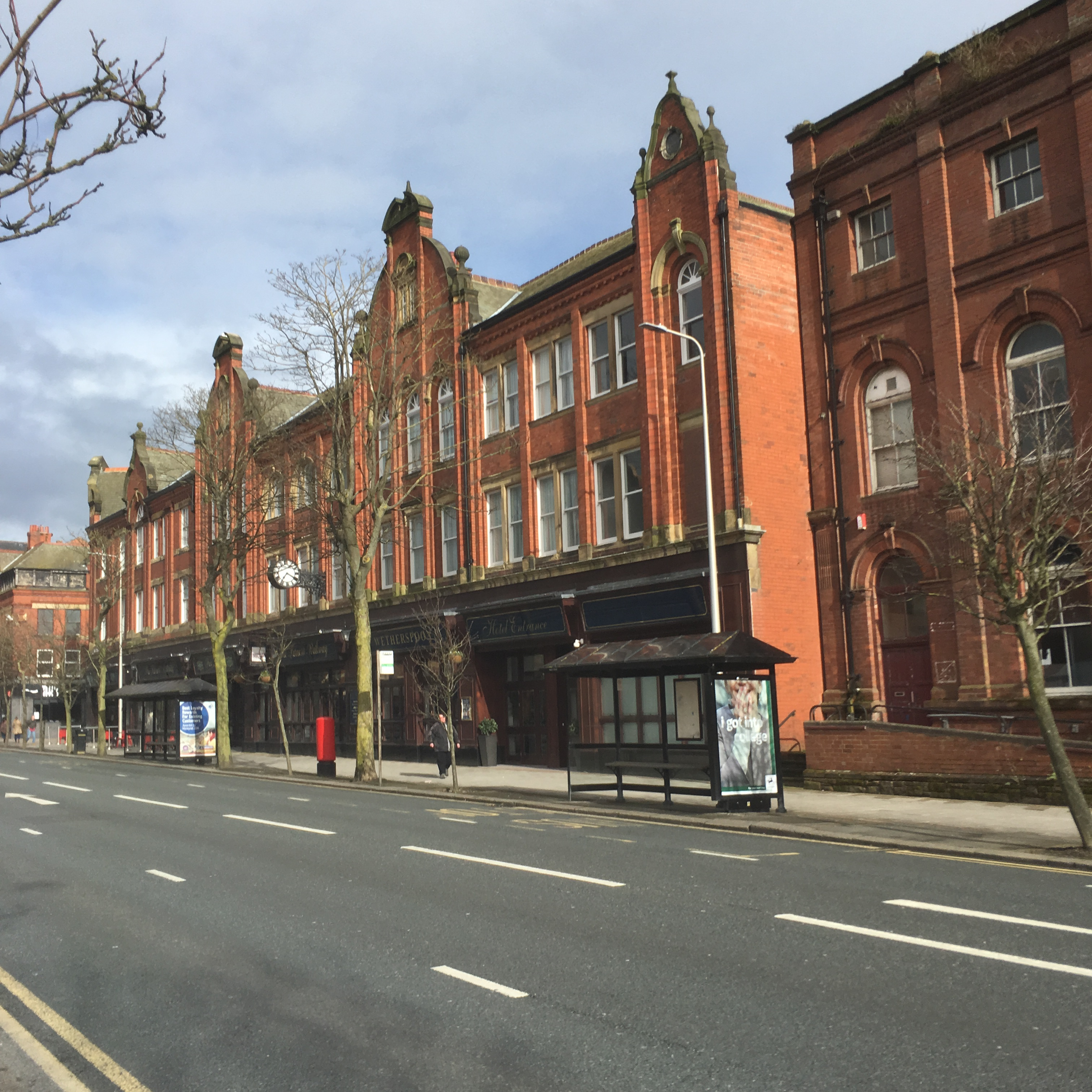
The Furness Railway photographed in March 2016

The Co-operative Building on Abbey Road in Barrow-in-Furness, Cumbria, England is a former department store. Constructed by the Barrow Co-operative Society in 1889 and expanded in 1902 it served as the town's largest such shop up until closure in 1996. Pub operator Wetherspoon opened a venue in the ground floor of the former Co-op Building in 1998 named after the Furness Railway and in 2015 converted the vacant upper floors of the building into a 52-bedroom hotel.

== See also ==
- British co-operative movement
