= Bootle, Cumbria =

Village in Cumbria, England

Coordinates: 54.28°N 3.37°W

Bootle
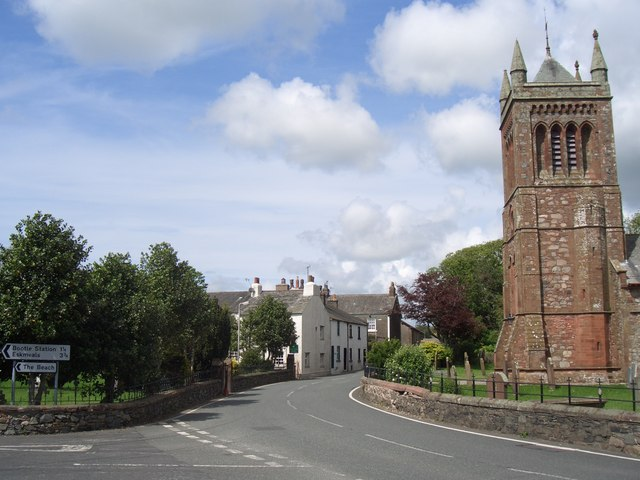
- St Michael and All Angels' Church

- Location in Copeland Borough Location within Cumbria
- Population: 742 (2011)
- OS grid reference: SD106882
- Civil parish: Bootle
- Unitary authority: Cumberland
- Ceremonial county: Cumbria
- Region: North West
- Country: England
- Sovereign state: United Kingdom
- Post town: MILLOM
- Postcode district: LA19
- Dialling code: 01229
- Police: Cumbria
- Fire: Cumbria
- Ambulance: North West
- UK Parliament: Barrow and Furness

Bootle (oo as in boot) is a village and civil parish in the Cumberland district in Cumbria, England. The parish had a population of 745 in the 2001 census, decreasing slightly to 742 at the 2011 census. Historically in Cumberland, the village is in the Lake District National Park, and is close to the Irish Sea coast. Near to Bootle is the Eskmeals Firing Range, which was a large employer but in the mid to late 1990s reduced the workforce. Also within the parish is Hycemoor, a hamlet situated 1.2 miles (1.9 km) north-west of Bootle, where Bootle railway station is located.

== Toponymy ==
Bootle is recorded in the Domesday Book as "Bodele" from the Old English word boðl which means a building. Variations of this spelling (e.g. Botle, Bowtle, Butehill, Bowtle, Botil) persist from about 1135 till 1580 when the spelling "Bootle" becomes common.

== History ==
Bootle is listed in the Domesday Book as one of the townships forming the Manor of Hougun held by Earl Tostig. – part of the Manor of Hougun and was assessed for geld purposes at 4 carucates (about 480 acres (190 ha)). Bootle was the furthest point to which the Normans penetrated Cumberland. They made no attempt to infiltrate further north into land held by British Celts or those places already settled by the Norse from Ireland, Isle of Man or Scotland. Instead they satisfied themselves, for the moment, with taking those lands on the southern coastal strip of West Cumberland that had been settled by the Angles of Northumbria and had belonged to Earl Tostig prior to the Norman Conquest. A charter for a market and a fair for the 'exaltation of the cross' was granted in 1347 by King Edward III to John de Huddleston, Lord of Millom.

== Governance ==
Bootle is within the Barrow and Furness UK parliamentary constituency.

An electoral ward of the same name exists. This ward stretches north along the coast as far as Muncaster with a total population of 1,300.

== Transport ==
- Bootle railway station, 1 mile (2 km) from Bootle

== Education ==
- The village has a Primary school which was founded in 1830 by Captain Isaac Shaw RN with an endowment of £290 and still bears his name Captain Shaw's School.

== Religious sites ==
- St Michael's Church
- Independent Chapel - Formerly a Congregational Church built in 1780. It became part of the United Reformed Church when the Congregational and Presbyterian Churches united in 1972 but became independent in the 1990s. The building is now owned by Rural Ministries and is still in use as an evangelical church.
- Seaton Priory There are some remains of the Benedictine nunnery to the north of the parish.

== Notable residents ==
- Trudy Harrison, former Conservative Member of Parliament
- Morgan Feeney, English professional footballer

== See also ==
- Listed buildings in Bootle, Cumbria
