= St Michael's Church, Bootle =

Coordinates: 54.2834°N 3.3728°W

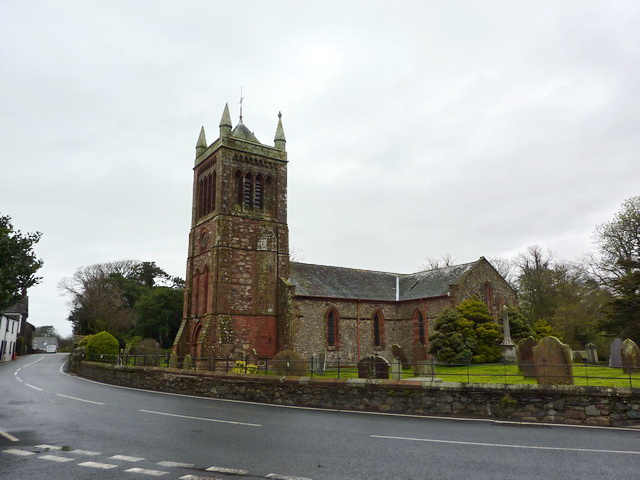
- St Michael's Church, Bootle, from the southwest

- Location in Cumbria
- OS grid reference: SD 107,884
- Location: Bootle, Cumbria
- Country: England
- Denomination: Anglican
- Website: St Michael, Bootle

History
- Status: Parish church
- Dedication: Saint Michael

Architecture
- Functional status: Active
- Heritage designation: Grade II
- Designated: 8 September 1967
- Architect: H. J. Underwood (transepts)
- Architectural type: Church
- Style: Gothic

Specifications
- Materials: Stone, slate roofs

Administration
- Province: York
- Diocese: Carlisle
- Archdeaconry: West Cumberland
- Deanery: Calder
- Parish: Bootle

Clergy
- Rector: Revd Ian James

St Michael's Church is in the village of Bootle, Cumbria, England. It is an active Anglican parish church in the deanery of Calder, the archdeaconry of West Cumberland, and the diocese of Carlisle. Its benefice has been united with those of St John the Baptist, Corney, St Mary, Whicham, and St Mary, Whitbeck. The church is recorded in the National Heritage List for England as a designated Grade II listed building.

== History ==
The church originated in the medieval era, but was considerably restored during the 19th century. The transepts were added in 1837 by H. J. Underwood, who changed the windows in the nave to match those in the transepts. Building of the tower started soon after 1850, with the belfry stage added in 1882. The church was restored in 1890–91 by the Lancaster architects Paley, Austin and Paley. This included heightening the walls of the chancel and the vestry by 2 feet (0.6 m), adding an organ chamber and a vestry to the north of the church, removing render from the exterior, installing new seats, roofs and floors, re-glazing the windows, and finally completing the tower.

== Architecture ==
=== Exterior ===
St Michael's is constructed in stone rubble with ashlar dressings, the chancel is roughcast, and the roofs are slated. Its plan is cruciform, consisting of a two-bay nave with north and south transepts, a chancel with a south organ loft, and a west tower. The tower has angle buttresses, with a west doorway, and two lancet windows and a clock face above it. The bell openings consist of pairs of louvred lancets, flanked by a blind lancet on each side. Above these is a Lombard frieze under a coped parapet with corner pinnacles. On the summit of the tower is a pyramidal roof surmounted by a cross. The nave contains lancet windows. In the transepts are stepped triple lancets with single lancets on the sides. The east window is round-headed with three lights, above which is a coped gable with a cross. On the north side of the chancel is a two-light window and a doorway. On the south side is the organ loft with lancet windows.

=== Interior ===
At the entrances to the transepts are two-bay arcades. The chancel arch is round and double chamfered. The font is octagonal and stands on a 19th-century base. It is carved with shields, the initials R. B., and the Hudleston arms, and carries an inscription in black letters. In the chancel is a piscina in a 19th-century surround, and a brass to Sir Hugh Askew who died in 1561. The stained glass in the east window is by Hardman, in the north wall of the chancel is a window dated 1899 by Henry Holiday, and in the transepts are windows by Ward and Hughes dating from the mid-1880s. The two manual organ was built in about 1890 by Gray and Davison, and was restored and revoiced in 1945 by Wilkinson.

== External features ==
In the churchyard is an ashlar sundial consisting of three round steps and a baluster shaft. It dates probably from the 18th century, and is listed at Grade II. Also in the churchyard, and listed at Grade II is a monument dated 1780 consisting of a carved headstone. The churchyard cross, dating from 1897 was designed by Paley, Austin and Paley.

== See also ==
- List of works by Paley, Austin and Paley
