= Kirksanton =

Village in Cumbria, England

Coordinates: 54.215°N 3.320°W

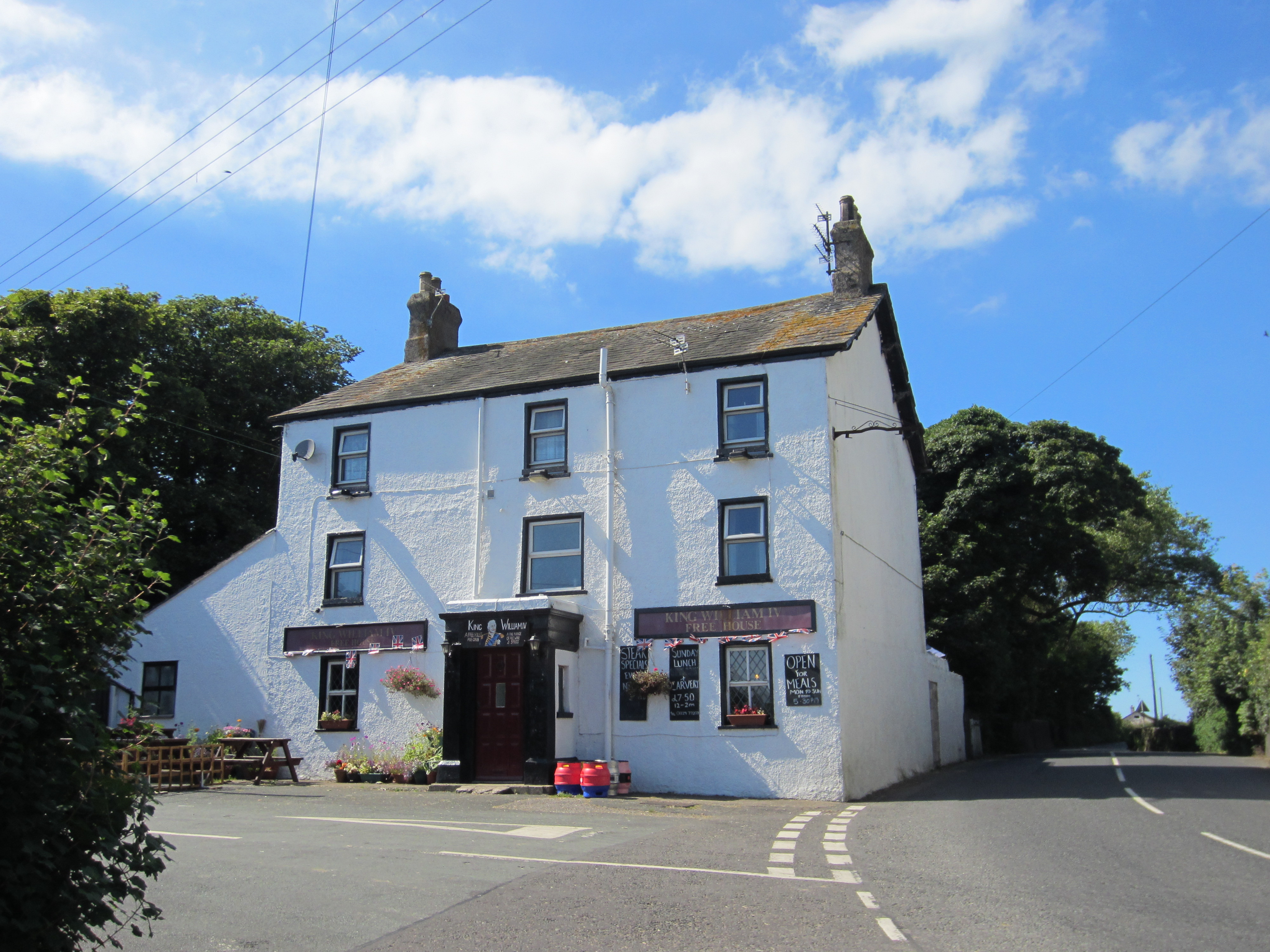
- King William IV Free House, Kirksanton

- Location in Copeland Borough Location within Cumbria
- OS grid reference: SD139807
- Civil parish: Whicham
- Unitary authority: Cumberland
- Ceremonial county: Cumbria
- Region: North West
- Country: England
- Sovereign state: United Kingdom
- Post town: MILLOM
- Postcode district: LA18
- Dialling code: 01229
- Police: Cumbria
- Fire: Cumbria
- Ambulance: North West
- UK Parliament: Barrow and Furness

Kirksanton (meaning "church of Saint Sanctan") is a village on the A5093 road, in the Cumberland district, in the county of Cumbria, England. Nearby settlements include the town of Millom, and the villages of Silecroft and Whicham.

In April 2009, Secretary of State for Energy and Climate Change Ed Miliband included Kirksanton in a list of eleven potential new nuclear power plants. The site was ruled out by the new Government's Energy Secretary Chris Huhne in October 2010 when the list of potential sites was reduced to eight, Braystones the only other potential new nuclear site at the time, was subsequently rejected also.

The village is located just outside the Lake District National Park.

== Governance ==
Kirksanton is within the Barrow and Furness UK parliamentary constituency.

Kirksanton does not have its own parish council; instead it's part of Whicham Parish Council.
