= Whitbeck, Cumbria =

Hamlet in Cumbria, England

Coordinates: 54.244°N 3.353°W

Whitbeck
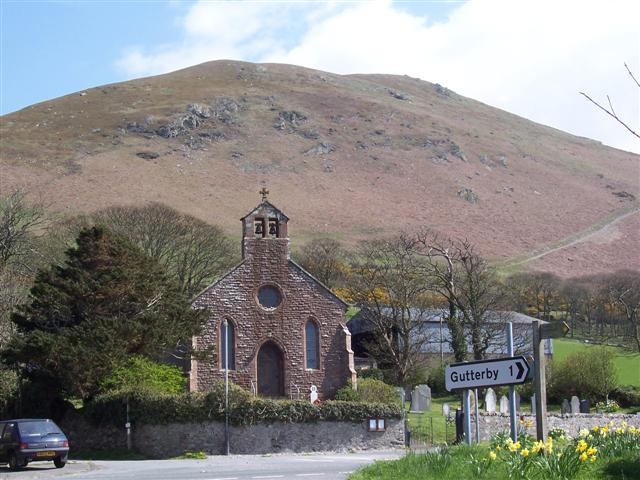
- Whitbeck church, with Black Combe behind

- Location in Copeland Borough Location within Cumbria
- Civil parish: Whicham
- Unitary authority: Cumberland
- Ceremonial county: Cumbria
- Region: North West
- Country: England
- Sovereign state: United Kingdom

Whitbeck is a hamlet and former civil parish, now in the parish of Whicham, in the Cumberland district, in the county of Cumbria, England. It was called Whidbek in the 1500s.

The Church of St Mary is grade II listed. It is described as "probably medieval in origin, heavily restored 1883".

It is on the A595 road on the south west coast of Cumbria, south west of Black Combe.

In 1931 the civil parish had a population of 150. On the 1 April 1934 the civil parish was merged into Whicham.

William Pearson (1767–1847), one of the founders of the Royal Astronomical Society was born here on 23 April 1767. His parents were William and Hannah (née Ponsonby) Pearson, who owned a farm at Moor Green.

William Pearson wrote the entry for Whitbeck in William Hutchinson's The history of the county of Cumberland..., 1794.
