= Black Combe =

Mountain in the English Lake District, Cumbria, England

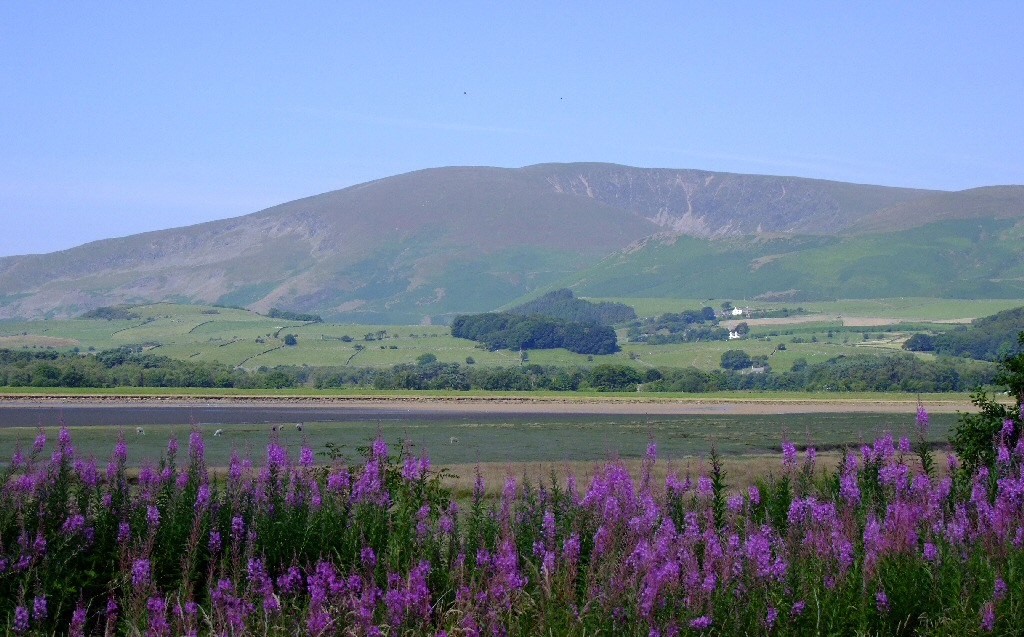
- Black Combe seen across the Duddon Estuary from Foxfield

Highest point
- Elevation: 600 m (2,000 ft)
- Prominence: 362 m (1,188 ft)
- Parent peak: Scafell Pike
- Listing: Marilyn, Outlying Wainwright
- Coordinates: 54°15′25″N 3°19′45″W

Geography
- Location within the Lake District Location within the former Borough of Copeland
- Location: Lake District, England
- OS grid: SD135854
- Topo map: OS Landranger 96

Black Combe is a fell in the south-west corner of the Lake District National Park, England, just 4 miles (6.4 km) from the Irish Sea. It lies near the west coast of Cumbria in the district of Cumberland and more specifically, in the ancient district of Millom. It is 1,970 ft (600 m) high and stands in isolation, some 10 mi (16 km) away from any higher ground; this factor offers an excellent all-round panoramic view of land and sea, weather permitting.

Black Combe is a Marilyn and, at 600m, it is only 10m short of being a Hewitt. Sub-tops include White Combe, Stoupdale Head, Swinside Fell and Stoneside Hill. The first two but not the last two are included in the index of Wainwright's The Outlying Fells of Lakeland and thus in lists of "Outlying fells". (All four sub-tops are shown on Wainwright's map of the fell in that book

The view from Black Combe is unique, a result of its isolated position to the south and west of the main Lake District fells. William Wordsworth claimed that "the amplest range of unobstructed prospect may be seen that British ground commands". Half the view is the glittering sea, with the Isle of Man seen clearly to the west, and the hills of Wales and Scotland seen as shadowy silhouettes.

On the seaward side views extend from the Cumbrian coast, and from Criffel, 49 mi (79 km) to the north, a mountain on the Scottish coast near Dumfries, round to the Isle of Man, 45 mi (72 km) due west, then round to Snowdon which may be seen on days of exceptionally good visibility, 85 mi (137 km) to the south, to the coast of Lancashire. On the landward side, views include the Scafell Group and the Coniston Group of fells in the Lake District National Park, including four 3,000 ft (910 m) mountains: Skiddaw, Scafell, Scafell Pike and Helvellyn. To the east and south the Pennine Hills, the Forest of Bowland and Blackpool Tower are visible. Closer by, there are also good views over the Duddon Estuary, Millom and the wind farm just offshore.

Black Combe is easy to see across Morecambe Bay as the most westerly outlying fell of the Lake District National Park. The name of the Cumberland View public house in Morecambe reflects the fact that Black Combe used to stand in the historical county of Cumberland. It can also be seen from the top end of the Wirral peninsula, between the turbines of the new Burbo Bank Offshore Wind Farm.

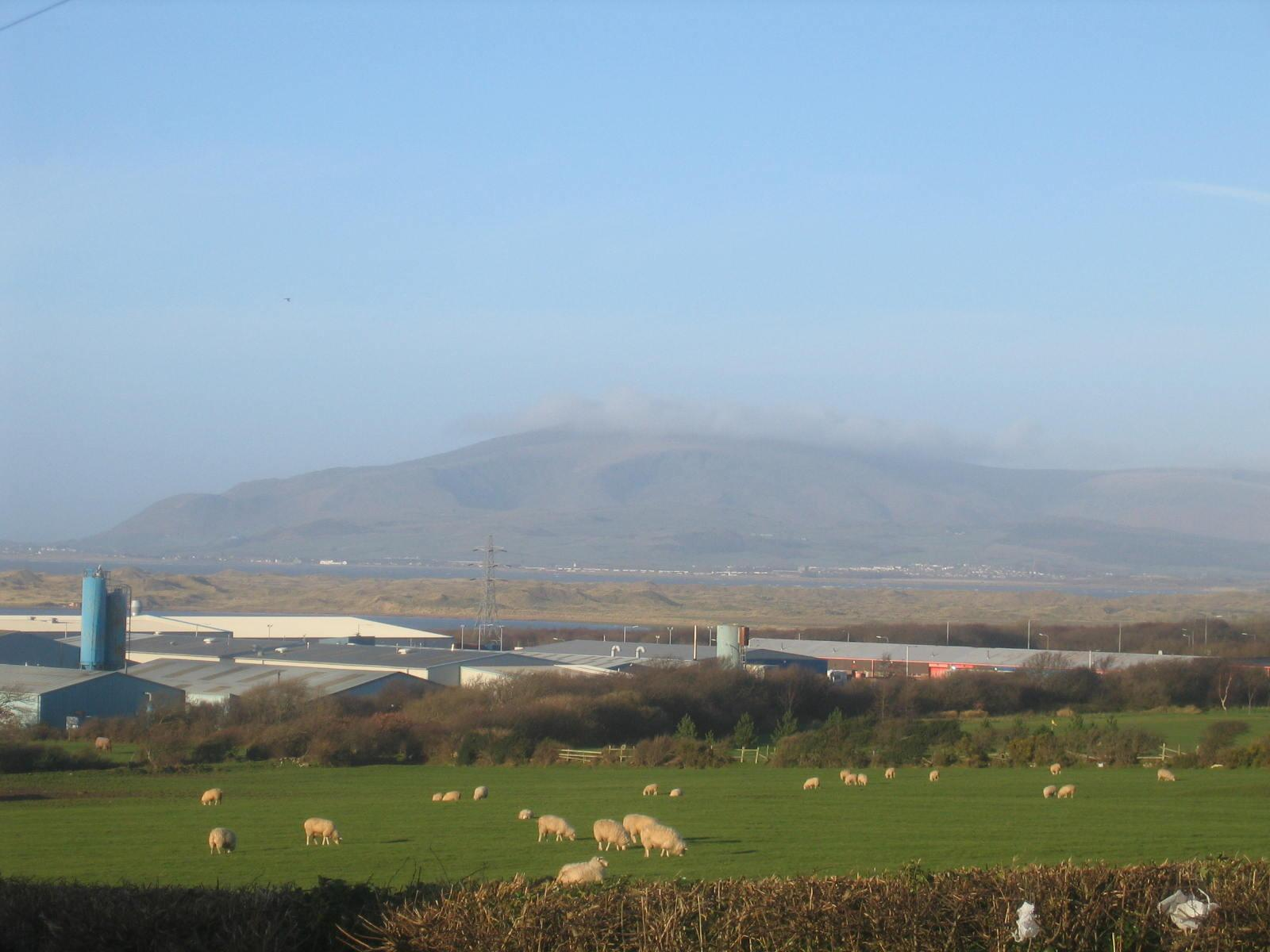
Black Combe viewed over the Duddon Estuary from Barrow-in-Furness

Clearly visible in views of Black Combe from the south and east is the large, dark-coloured glacial corrie, known as Blackcombe, from which the fell's name is derived. Such corries are often known as combes in English place names, a word cognate with the Welsh word cwm. Adjacent to Blackcombe is a lighter-coloured corrie called Whitecombe.

Black Combe was one of the five stations in Cumberland used by the Ordnance Survey to measure the angles of Principal Triangles for their initial survey of Britain in the years up to and including 1809. The other stations were "Dent Hill", Scilly Banks (on the outskirts of Whitehaven), High Pike and Cross Fell.

The Black Combe Walking Festival takes place annually in June and the Black Combe fell race takes place in early March.

The Swinside, or Sunken Kirk, stone circle is on the eastern flanks of Swinside Fell, in the north east of Black Combe.

== Folklore ==
An 1864 text refers to the folklore of Black Combe:

"Some superstitions, and a few odd customs, still exist about Black Combe. It is said there that the bees sing, and the labouring ox kneels in adoration at twelve o'clock at night on Christmas Eve; and that what quarter soever a bull lies facing, on Allhalloween, thence will blow the prevailing winter wind; and Hob Thross, a body all ower rough, like the Brownie of old time and Milton's lubber fiend, has still, we believe, private quarters some where in the lowly dwellings about Black Combe; or had, before the railroad came to sweep him away into the limbo of the unproved and the unpractical, Newly married people do not buy corn for their first sowing about Black Combe; they go through the country side, begging a handful here and a handful there, till their friends and neighbours have filled their sack, and given them their future crop: else sorrow a loaf of bread would they rear, were they to give money for their grain. They are called cornlaiters when on this interesting mission: laiting meaning seeking or looking for. On Christmas morning the local dish hereabouts is hack pudding, made of sheep's heart, snet, and dried fruits. Servants are hired only at Martinmas and Whitsuntide; money is lent only at Candlemas; and the dead are always waked."

== Geology ==
The rocks of Black Combe were formed during the Ordovician period, roughly 460 million years ago. Faulting has exposed an inlier of mudstones from the Skiddaw Group. These rocks, largely mudstones, siltstones and occasional sandstones or greywackes, were formed in deep seas when occasional slides of coastal sediments were redeposited at greater depth.

The nearby Millom Park includes Millom Rock Park, open to the public at all times.

== Routes ==
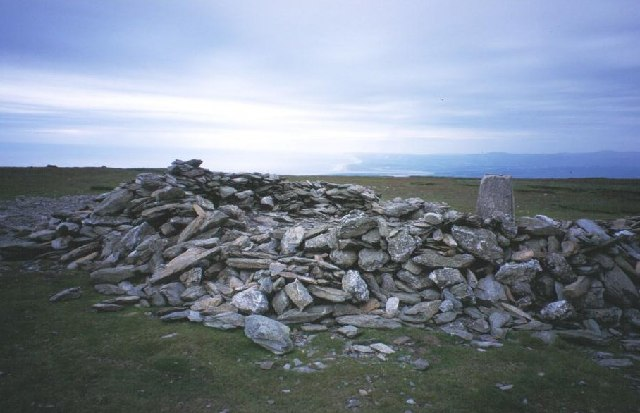
The sprawling cairn on the wide summit of Black Combe

Walks to the top of the fell begin at St Mary's Church, Whicham to the south; St Mary's Church, Whitbeck to the west or from the Corney Fell Road which crosses the fells at an altitude of 1,250 ft (380 m) 4 miles (6.4 km) to the north of the top. A more challenging and interesting route begins at Beckside Farm on the A595 road and follows Whitecombe Beck before ascending the Horse Back ridge. This ridge separates Blackcombe and Whitecombe on the eastern side of the fell, and gives good views into both combes.

The summit plateau is a very flat peat-covered area. There is a Triangulation Pillar on the top, surrounded by rough drystone wall which forms a wind shelter. 1,286 ft (392 m) due south from the peak is a lesser peak upon which stands a large cairn which is easily visible with the naked eye from Millom and the surrounding area. Between this cairn and the top, in a shallow valley, lies a small tarn.

Black Combe is the subject of a chapter of Wainwright's book The Outlying Fells of Lakeland. While most of the chapters of that book describe single, usually circular, walks, Black Combe is treated similarly to the summits in the main Pictorial Guide to the Lakeland Fells: the author describes three distinct ascent routes (from the south at Whicham, the west on the A595 road, the north on the fell road) and a circuit of White Combe to the east.

Black Combe is included as Walk 27 in the Ordnance Survey's Lake District volume of their Pathfinder Guides Outstanding Circular Walks series. This describes an 8.5m (13.5km) walk starting near Whicham Church, ascending from the south and then descending to the north-west before returning via Whitbeck.
