= Bootle railway station =

Railway station in Cumbria, England

Bootle Bootle (Cumbria)
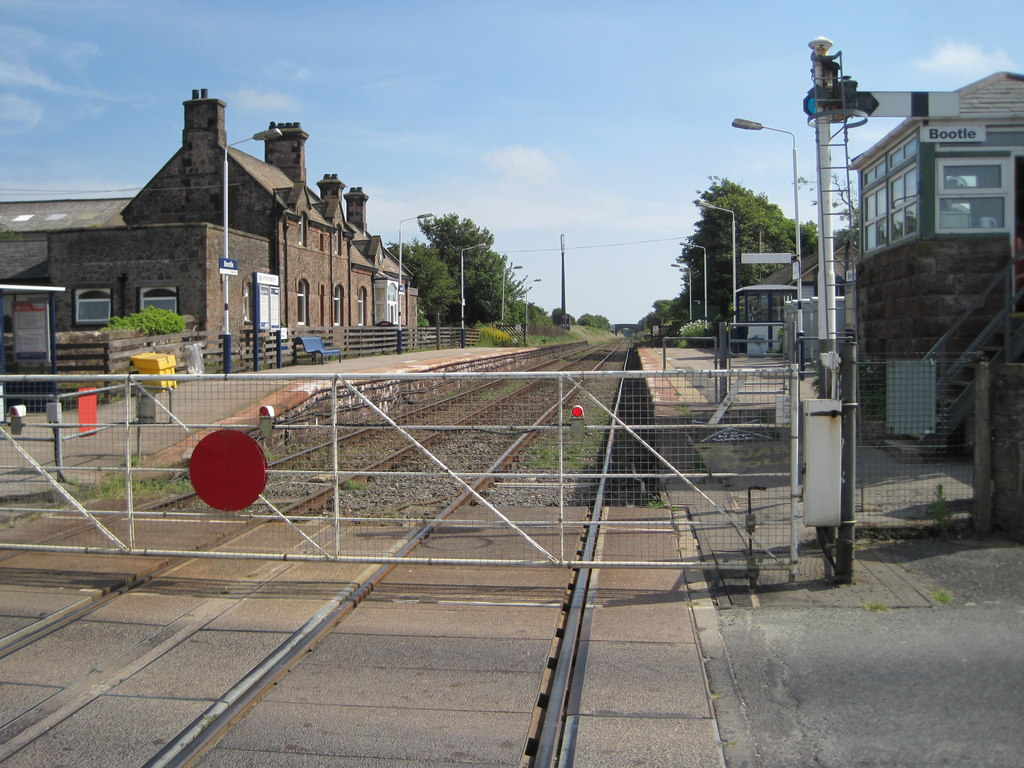

General information
- Location: Bootle, Cumberland; England
- Coordinates: 54°17′28″N 3°23′38″W
- Grid reference: SD093892
- Owner: Network Rail
- Manager: Northern Trains
- Platforms: 2
- Tracks: 2

Other information
- Station code: BOC
- Classification: DfT category F2

History
- Original company: Whitehaven and Furness Junction Railway
- Pre-grouping: Furness Railway
- Post-grouping: London, Midland and Scottish Railway; British Rail (London Midland Region)

Key dates
- 8 July 1850: Opened

Passengers
- 2021/22: ▲12,154
- 2022/23: ▼11,966
- 2023/24: ▲11,998
- 2024/25: ▲13,844
- 2025/26: ▼11,996
Location
- Location within the former Borough of Copeland
Notes
- Passenger statistics from the Office of Rail and Road

Bootle railway station is a railway station serving the village of Bootle, Cumbria, on the Cumbrian Coast Line, which runs between Carlisle and Barrow-in-Furness, and is between Ravenglass and Silecroft. The station, situated 53 miles 34 chains (86.0 km) from Carnforth (measured via Barrow-in-Furness). It is managed by Northern Trains, who operate all services.

== History ==
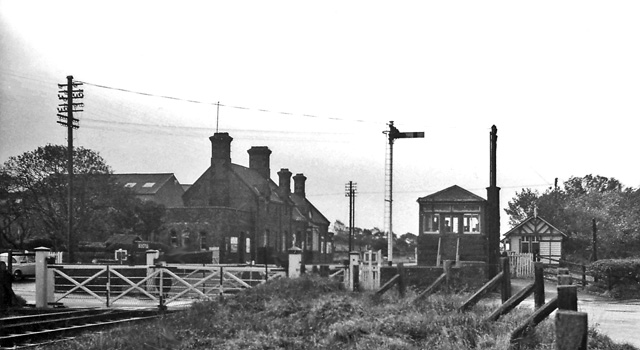
Looking south towards Barrow-in-Furness, as photographed in October 1966.

The Whitehaven and Furness Junction Railway was authorised in 1847 for a line which would link the town of Whitehaven with the Furness Railway at Broughton-in-Furness. It was opened in stages, and the section between Ravenglass and Bootle opened on 8 July 1850. The last section between Bootle and Broughton-in-Furness was opened for passenger services 1 November 1850. The station had a coal depot, a goods yard with a shed and 5 ton crane; the yard was able to accommodate live stock, horse and cattle vans. The station was host to a LMS caravan in 1936.

The station was refurbished around 1873, including the building of the station buildings, signal box and goods yard. The goods yard was removed in 1965.

=== Explosion on 22 March 1945 ===
At about 22:17 on 22 March 1945, a wagon containing depth charges in a southbound freight train caught fire on approaching Bootle. The train crew, driver H. Goodall and fireman Herbert Norman Stubbs, on becoming aware of the fire, stopped the train south of Bootle station. Despite the fierce fire, the crew isolated the burning wagon by uncoupling the rear portion of the train, then drawing it forward to before uncoupling the burning wagon. With the wagon isolated, the fireman went forward to protect the northbound line while the driver went back in a possible attempt to fight the fire. At this point the depth charges violently exploded, killing the driver and creating a crater 105 feet long to a depth of 50 feet. The line was closed for three days whilst the crater was filled in and the track relaid.

Stubbs was subsequently awarded the George Medal and the Order of Industrial Heroism.

== Facilities ==
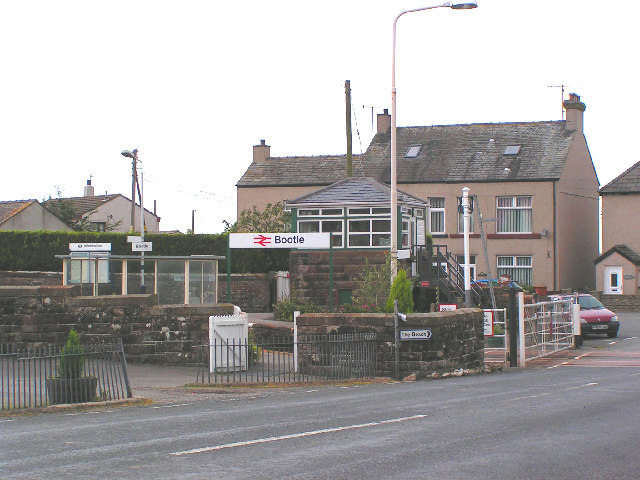
The Grade II-listed signal box, as photographed in October 2005.

The station is unstaffed. A ticket vending machine has been installed by Northern to allow passenger to buy before boarding. Shelters are present on both platforms, with the wooden one on the northbound side being the more substantial of the two. Train running information can be obtained by telephone, digital display screens or from timetable posters. The weatherboarded, timber-framed waiting room and shelter on the west platform is Grade II listed. It dates from 1873 and its interior layout and fittings have changed little. It is an increasingly rare example of this type of structure.

The signal box (built circa 1874) is a Furness Railway Type 1 design and was also listed in November 2013 for its historic interest as one of the earliest surviving signal boxes in England and in the best original condition of the two of this type remaining. Its lower structure is built of red sandstone dressed with rock-faced ashlar and its roof is of Welsh slate. Inside it retains a London Midland Region lever frame of 15 levers installed in 1977. In November 2024 plans were announced for its restoration.

== Passenger volume ==
Passenger volume at Bootle
	2004–05	2005–06	2006–07	2007–08	2008–09	2009–10	2010–11	2011–12	2012–13	2013–14	2014–15	2015–16	2016–17	2017–18	2018–19	2019–20	2020–21	2021–22	2022–23	2023–24	2024–25
Entries and exits	13,397	12,537	14,512	14,403	17,828	15,582	14,946	12,796	13,312	11,496	13,862	12,172	11,850	10,870	13,386	17,226	4,616	12,154	11,966	11,998	13,844

The statistics cover twelve month periods that start in April.

== Services ==
On weekdays and Saturdays, there is generally an hourly (with some longer gaps in the early morning and afternoon) service southbound to Barrow, and northbound towards Whitehaven and Carlisle. Some services continue beyond Barrow via the Furness line to Lancaster. A slightly less frequent service operates on Sundays, with a few trains in each directions.

Throughout 2026, trains northbound are curtailing to Corkickle, due to long-term engineering work.

Preceding station	National Rail	Following station
Ravenglass	Northern Trains; Cumbrian Coast Line	Silecroft
	Historical railways	
Eskmeals	Whitehaven and Furness Junction Railway	Silecroft

== See also ==
- Listed buildings in Bootle, Cumbria

== Bibliography ==
- Wills, Dixe (2014). Tiny Stations (Paperback, 1st reprint ed.). Basingstoke: AA Publishing. ISBN 978-0-7495-7732-2.
