= St Mary's Church, Whicham =

Coordinates: 54.2326°N 3.3287°W

St Mary's Church
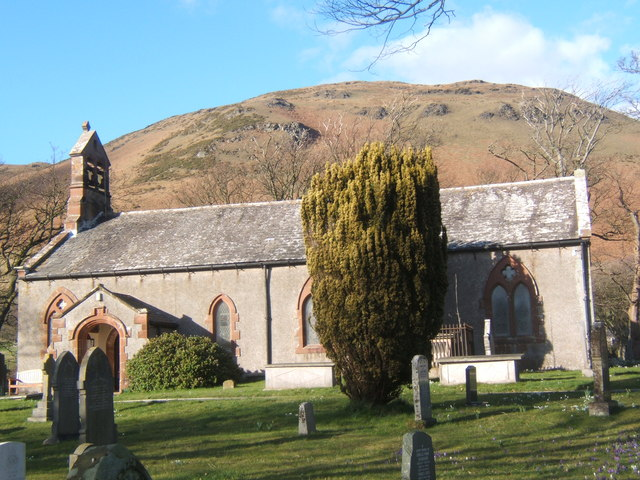
- St Mary's Church from the south

- Location in Copeland Borough Location in Cumbria
- OS grid reference: SD 135,827
- Location: Whicham, Cumbria
- Country: England
- Denomination: Anglican
- Website: St Mary, Whicham

History
- Status: Parish church

Architecture
- Functional status: Active
- Heritage designation: Grade II
- Designated: 8 September 1967
- Architectural type: Church
- Style: Norman (?), Gothic, Gothic Revival

Specifications
- Materials: Stone, slate roof

Administration
- Province: York
- Diocese: Carlisle
- Archdeaconry: West Cumberland
- Deanery: Calder
- Parish: Whicham

Clergy
- Rector: Revd Ian James

St Mary's Church is on the A595 road in Whicham, Cumbria, England. It is an active Anglican parish church in the deanery of Calder, the archdeaconry of West Cumberland, and the diocese of Carlisle. Its benefice is united with those of St Michael, Bootle, St John the Baptist, Corney, and St Mary, Whitbeck. The church is recorded in the National Heritage List for England as a designated Grade II listed building.

== History ==
The church probably originates from the 12th century. The east window is from the 17th century, and the north transept from 1858, when the church was restored. In 1901–02 the Lancaster architects Austin and Paley repaired and reseated the church, added vestries, and installed three new windows in the nave.

== Architecture ==
St Mary's is constructed in stone with a slate roof. Its plan consists of a nave and chancel in a single cell, a south porch, and a north vestry and transept. On the west gable is a double bellcote. On the south side is a lancet window and three two-light windows containing plate tracery. The porch leads to a round-arched doorway that is said to be Norman in origin. At both the west and east ends of the church are three-light windows. The transept has two lancet windows on the north side. Inside the church are box pews. Between the nave and the north transept is a wooden arcade. The font consists of an octagonal tub. Also in the church are the royal arms of George III. The stained glass is mainly by William Wailes. The single-manual pipe organ was made in about 1890 by Wilkinson, and renovated in 1980.

== See also ==
- Listed buildings in Whicham
- List of ecclesiastical works by Austin and Paley (1895–1914)
