= Furness Railway =

English railway company

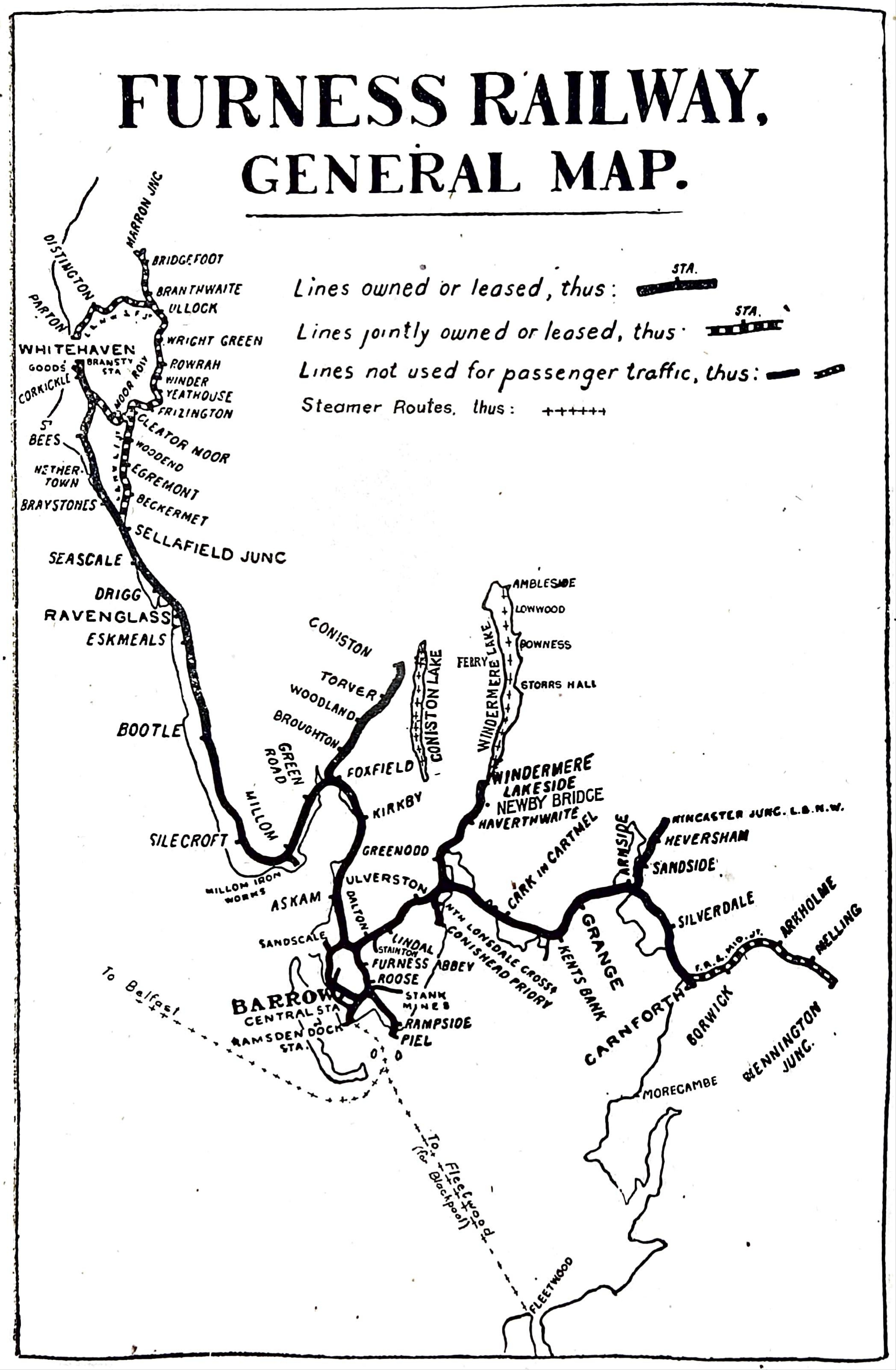
- 1920 map of the railway

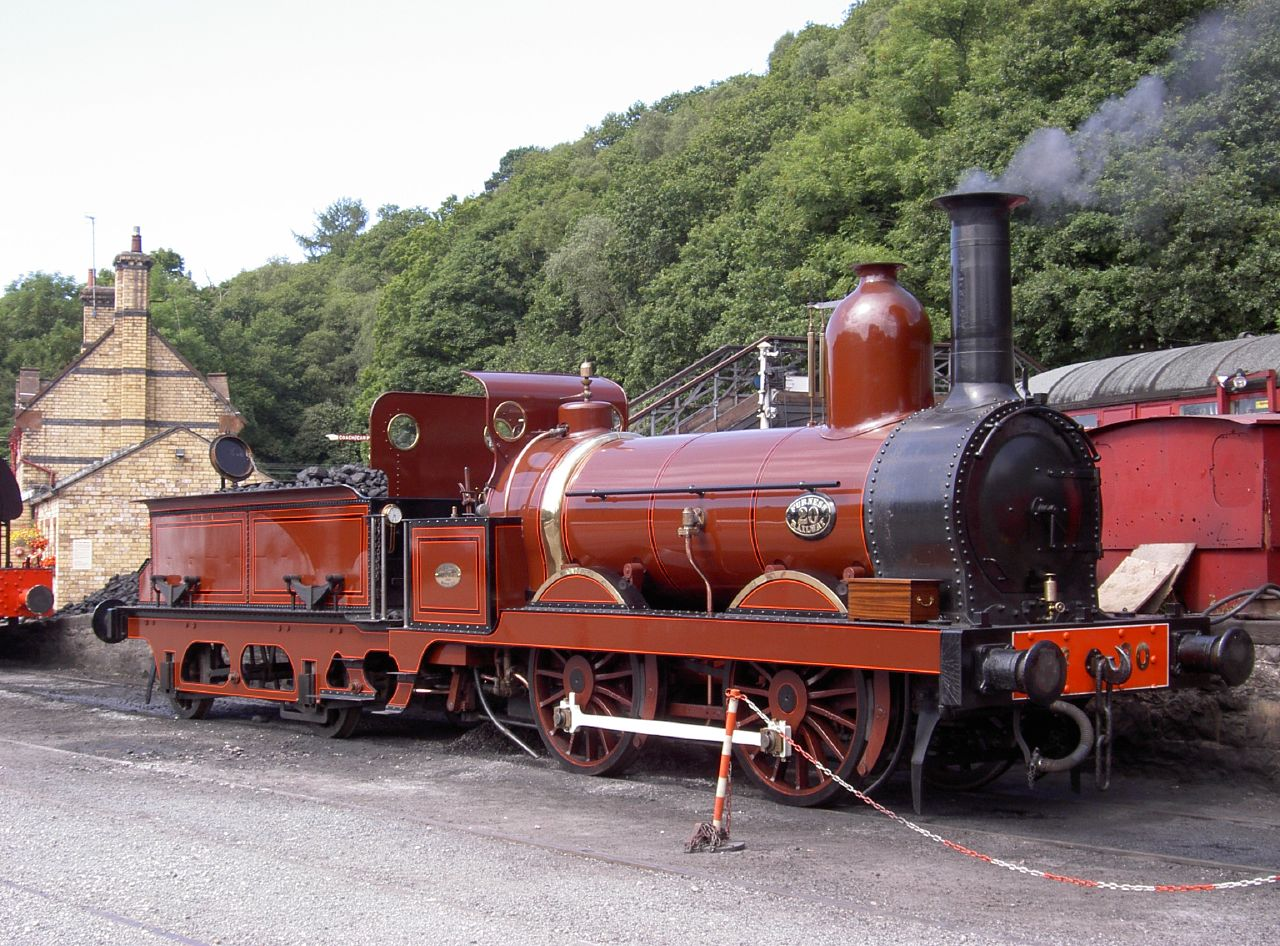
- Furness Railway locomotive No. 20

Overview
- Dates of operation: 1846–1922
- Successor: London, Midland and Scottish Railway

Technical
- Track gauge: 4 ft 8 1/2 in (1,435 mm) standard gauge
- Length: 157 miles 72 chains (254.1 km) (1919)
- Track length: 430 miles 44 chains (692.9 km) (1919)

The Furness Railway (FR) was a railway company operating in the Furness area of Lancashire and in south Cumberland in North West England. Its mainly coastal system stretched from Whitehaven in the north to Carnforth in the east, with several branches; and by means of joint railways and running powers, also reached Wennington and Workington.

== History ==
=== Formation ===
In the early 1840s, the owners of iron ore mines in the Furness district of Lancashire became interested in a waggonway from their mines to Barrow; the project was adopted and expanded by the Duke of Buccleuch and the Earl of Burlington. Advertisements in 1843 announced a scheme, supported by their Lordships, for a Furness Railway to link Ulverston 'the capital of the district', iron ore mines (at Dalton-in-Furness) and slate mines (at Kirkby-in-Furness) with the coast at Barrow harbour and at Piel pier. Traffic on the line would be horse-drawn, but the line was to be laid out to allow easy conversion to the use of steam power. A survey had already been carried out by James Walker. "The primary object of this undertaking" explained a subsequent advertisement "is to improve the present very dilatory provision for the transport of the valuable Mineral products of Furness and adjoining Districts to the Coast" but it was noted from the start that much of the line would form part of any coastal route north from Lancaster.

Furness Railway Act 1844
- Act of Parliament
- Parliament of the United Kingdom
- Long title: An Act for making a Railway from Rampside and Barrow to Dalton, Lindale, and Kirkby Ireleth, in the County Palatine of Lancaster, to be called "The Furness Railway."
- Citation: 7 & 8 Vict. c. xxii

Dates
- Royal assent: 23 May 1844

Other legislation
- Repealed by: Furness Railway Act 1855

Status: Repealed

The subscription to the company was largely taken up by the duke and the earl, and their associates; although there were some local subscribers – Henry Schneider was on the company's provisional committee – failure to attract local capital meant that the original intention to serve Ulverston was dropped. The company's bill was not opposed in Parliament and the act was given royal assent on 23 May 1844 as the Furness Railway Act 1844 (7 & 8 Vict. c. xxii). A further act in 1846 authorised extensions from Kirkby to Broughton-in-Furness, and from Dalton to Ulverston. Goods traffic began running between Dalton and Barrow in June 1846, operated by a single locomotive. The line was passed for passenger use early in August 1846; by the end of the month, passenger trains were running from Dalton to Piel pier, connecting with a steamer to Fleetwood.

At a celebratory excursion and dinner for the directors and friends held at the end of October 1846, it was remarked that the mineral traffic was limited by a shortage of wagons (which prevented the Dalton branch handling more than 2,000 tons of iron ore a day) and of locomotives (which meant that the Kirkby branch was not yet being worked), and that 10,000 of the 12,000 passengers carried so far were excursionists from Fleetwood or Blackpool. Passenger services ceased after about two months, and the line between Dalton and Rampside Junction was doubled to remove the difficulties experienced in working both mineral and passenger traffic on a single track line. In 1847, differences between the railway company and the owner of Piel pier saw the Fleetwood steamer running to Barrow; it returned to Piel pier in 1848; subsequently, steamers also ran between Piel pier and Poulton-le-Sands, connecting with the "Little" North Western Railway. Periodic disagreements and reconciliations saw the steamer service terminal switch between Piel and Barrow on a number of occasions until (1853) the Furness Railway bought the pier.

=== Extensions ===
The Kirkby branch was extended to Broughton, passing inspection for passenger traffic at the end of February 1848; when a Broughton to Barrow train was derailed by mis-set points in July 1849, it was noted that "nearly all the gates and points on the Furness line are attended by women" and that a woman had the management of the points which had been mis-set. The Dalton branch was extended to Lindal (goods traffic running from mines there from early May 1851) and then on to Ulverston, eight waggons of coal being delivered there from Whitehaven in April 1854, even before the station was complete. Passenger services on that section began in June 1854. In 1854, 330,000 tons of iron ore travelled over the railway (as against 225,000 tons the previous year), other goods traffic was up from 22,000 tons in 1853 to 40,000 tons, and there were 145,000 passenger movements (95,000 in 1853); the company declared a dividend at a rate of 6% a year.

Copper mining interests at Coniston promoted the Coniston Railway, running from the Furness Railway at Broughton to Coniston and on to the copper mines. The line was nominally independent of the FR, but the Duke of Devonshire (as the Earl of Burlington had become in 1858) was its chairman; the FR took shares in it, and worked it. It opened for passenger traffic 19 July 1859, although its opening for goods and mineral traffic was deferred for some months as the provision was still incomplete. The Furness Railway obtained an act of Parliament, the Furness and Coniston Railways Amalgamation Act 1862 (25 & 26 Vict. c. cxxxiii) giving powers to amalgamate the Coniston Railway with it in 1862.

A branch was built from (just west of) the Leven Viaduct to Greenodd (allowing suppression of a swing bridge in the viaduct) then through Newby Bridge to a terminus beside Windermere at Finsthwaite; the locality had been known as The Landing, but the station was named Lake-side. The line opened June 1869; a company part-owned (after 1873 fully owned) by the FR ran Windermere steamer services in conjunction with the trains; a Bowness resident promptly writing to The Times to query the absence of lifeboats on the steamers. (Note: In 1901, the FR's steamer Swan was rammed and sunk at night by the Tern. The Swan fortunately had only 50 people (including crew) on board who were all able to scramble aboard the Tern before the Swan went under A Board of Trade Inquiry was subsequently told that the Swan was licensed by the Board of Trade to carry 442 passengers and carried four lifebuoys and no lifebelts (which the Board of Trade (but not their local inspector) considered adequate.))

=== Connections and acquisitions ===
==== Whitehaven and Furness Junction Railway ====
The Whitehaven and Furness Junction Railway (W&FJR) was completed in November 1851, connecting the Furness Railway to Whitehaven and (on completion of the Bransty tunnel at Whitehaven in 1852) to the West Coast Main Line at Carlisle. In 1865, the W&FJR was leased by the Furness Railway, with a full amalgamation taking effect on 1 July 1866, being authorised by the Furness Railway (Whitehaven Amalgamation) Act 1866 (29 & 30 Vict. c. ccxxxvi). The secretary-manager of the W&FJR became secretary of the Furness Railway, whose general manager was promoted to the board of the company, retaining his salary but now being styled 'resident director'. The Furness Railway now extended to Whitehaven, with running powers to Workington, and to the iron works on the North side of the Derwent there. The FR also inherited the W&FJR's involvement in the Cleator and Furness Railway, a joint line with the Whitehaven Cleator and Egremont Railway (WC&ER), authorised by the Cleator and Furness Railway Act 1866 (29 & 30 Vict. c. cxxxii), linking the WC&ER at Egremont with the W&FJR at Sellafield to simplify the movement of ore southwards; this line opened on 1 August 1869.

Furness Railway Act 1869
- Act of Parliament
- Parliament of the United Kingdom
- Long title: An Act for conferring further powers upon the Furness Railway Company for the construction of Works and the acquisition of Lands, and otherwise in relation to their undertaking; and for other purposes.
- Citation: 32 & 33 Vict. c. cliv

Dates
- Royal assent: 9 August 1869

Text of statute as originally enacted

In 1865, before the lease and amalgamation, the W&FJR and the FR had put forward rival bills for crossing the Duddon estuary much lower down it than the existing crossing at Foxfield, thus usefully shortening the rail distance between Whitehaven (and points north) and Barrow (and Carnforth). The parliamentary committee had decided in favour of the W&FJR, and the scheme was inherited by the FR. However, in 1868 the FR decided to abandon the project: there was a trade recession (the FR's dividend being consequently reduced to 8% from its accustomed 10%) and the FR had recently made major capital outlays on the Furness and Midland line (£100,000) and the construction of wet docks at Barrow (£200,000): an act of Parliament, the Furness Railway Act 1869 (32 & 33 Vict. c. cliv) sanctioning the abandonment was obtained in 1869, but the FR had henceforth to charge on the basis of the mileages if the crossing had been built. After the discovery of a large hematite deposit in the Holborn Hill area, the line between Millom and Barrow was doubled throughout; the line between Seascale and Bootle was also doubled.

==== Ulverstone and Lancaster Railway ====
The Ulverstone and Lancaster Railway (U&LR) was built by a separate company (Note: Except that the original sections for the U&LR gave a disparity in height of seven feet between it and the FR at the point where they were to meet in Ulverston. The two companies resolved this by the FR modifying the last three miles of its Ulverston extension and building the first three-quarter of a mile of the U&LR; the cost of this work being borne by both companies (disagreement, arbitration, and litigation ensued as to how the cost should be allocated).) to link Ulverston with Carnforth, on the Lancaster and Carlisle Railway thus giving a rail link southwards from Furness and West Cumbria to the West Coast Main Line so that – as the Earl of Burlington noted at a celebratory banquet marking the opening of the line on 26 August 1857 – they "were now joined in the great network of the rest of England", allowing a lucrative goods traffic:

"A few days ago some 67 tons of pig iron, the produce of the new blast furnace at Harrington passed over the Whitehaven Junction and Whitehaven and Furness Railways en route direct to South Staffordshire by the newly-opened railway across the Ulverston Sands".

In 1858, after completion of the U&LR, modifications were made to the junctions at Foxfield (with the W&FJR) and at Millwood (where the Broughton and Ulverston branches met) to allow through running of Whitehaven-Carnforth traffic without reversing.

From its opening, the U&LR was worked by the Furness Railway, which purchased it (with effect from July 1861) in 1862, taking over the Ulverston Canal Company in the same year. The line from Barrow to Ulverston was already double-track, and the line between Ulverston and Carnforth was doubled in 1863.

==== Furness and Midland Joint Railway ====
Furness Railway Act 1867
- Act of Parliament
- Parliament of the United Kingdom
- Long title: An Act for conferring further Powers upon the Furness Railway Company for the Construction of Works and the Acquisition of Lands, and otherwise in relation to their Undertaking; to provide for the Abandonment of the Railway authorized by "The Furness and Lancaster and Carlisle Union Railway Act, 1865," and the Dissolution of the Furness and Lancaster and Carlisle Union Railway Company; and for other Purposes.
- Citation: 30 & 31 Vict. c. civ

Dates
- Royal assent: 20 June 1867

Other legislation
- Relates to: Furness and Lancaster and Carlisle Union Railway Act 1865

Text of statute as originally enacted

In 1863, in conjunction with the Midland Railway, the FR promoted a bill for the Furness and Midland Joint Railway (F&MJR) between Wennington and Carnforth; the intention was said to be to give a more direct connection between the iron ore of Furness and Yorkshire ironworks and coal-mines. The London and North Western Railway cast doubt on this, pointing out that Furness got its metallurgical coke from South Durham over the Stainmore line and exported most of its ore to districts better served by the LNWR, but withdrew its objection on being offered the same powers as the Midland over the FR. The F&MJR opened for passenger traffic 6 June 1867; it was worked by the Midland. The FR secured an act of Parliament, the Furness Railway Act 1867 (30 & 31 Vict. c. civ), for the construction of the Hincaster Branch from Arnside to the Lancaster and Carlisle Railway at Hincaster. This single-track line was intended to shorten the distance to Barrow for the coke traffic over Stainmore. In 1870, the FR brought forward, and then abandoned, a bill authorising abandonment of the project; construction was pursued with no great urgency, the line not opening until June 1876.

==== Lines in the West Cumberland ore-field ====
The FR objected when in 1877 the Whitehaven, Cleator and Egremont Railway (WC&ER) agreed terms for its amalgamation with the London and North Western Railway (LNWR); instead as of July 1879 the WC&ER became a joint line of the Furness and the LNWR. The FR also bought shares in the Cleator and Workington Junction Railway (C&WJR), and worked the main line of the C&WJR.

=== Development of Barrow ===
The Furness Railway's prosperity came originally from the export of haematite ore, but the growth of heavy industry at Barrow became a significant contributor. In 1867, The Engineer explained why the demand for Furness haematite had formerly been limited:

"The ironstone mines there had been worked for some considerable time, and the ore was carried by rail and by sea to the coal districts of Lancashire, to the Staffordshire blast furnaces, and to Wales. The mining operations were, of course, very limited, and the price of the ore subject to extensive fluctuations, owing to the circumstance that the red haematite ore was only used as an admixture to other ores to improve the quality of iron, and the ironmasters used a small proportion of this more expensive ore, or tried to do entirely without it, whenever they could not obtain a sufficiently remunerative price for their pig iron in the market. Pure hematite iron, as such, was generally disliked in the trade on account of a certain amount of red shortness which it was known to give to all kinds of puddled iron produced from it; besides the red hematite was thought difficult to smelt by itself".

— Whitehaven News

It had been reported that in 1856, 464,823 tons of iron ore were raised in Furness "of which 445,013 tons were carried over the Furness Railway and shipped at Barrow, 16,290 on the Ulverston canal, and 3,550 consumed at the Charcoal Iron Furnaces and at the Low Furness Iron and Steel Works. Of the ore carried over the Furness line 200,000 tons are sent to Wales, and the remainder to the Staffordshire, Cleveland and West Riding Iron districts."

Furness Railway and Barrow Harbour Act 1863
- Act of Parliament
- Parliament of the United Kingdom
- Long title: An Act for vesting the Harbour of Barrow in the County Palatine of Lancaster in the Furness Railway Company; for enabling the said Company to construct a Dock and other Works at Barrow, and to raise further Capital; and for other Purposes.
- Citation: 26 & 27 Vict. c. lxxxix

Dates
- Royal assent: 22 June 1863

Text of statute as originally enacted

A very small village at Barrow grew into one of about 2,000 serving the ore-export facility there, with the Furness Railway effectively responsible for the settlement. The FR took over Barrow Harbour from its commissioners by the Furness Railway and Barrow Harbour Act 1863 (26 & 27 Vict. c. lxxxix) to allow the construction of wet docks at Barrow; it obtained powers in the Furness Gas and Waterworks Act 1864 (27 & 28 Vict. c. clxix) to supply Barrow and the surrounding district with gas and water.

Barrow grew rapidly in the 1860s, as The Engineer noted:

"A town of about 20,000 inhabitants, grown up from a village of scarcely one-tenth the population in the short space of seven years is a unicum in European geography")

It gave two reasons:

"The stimulus to which in the first instance the rapid rise of Barrow-in-Furness has been due, is the erection of blast furnaces on that spot for the production of pig iron from the red hematite ore, belonging to the district near Barrow and Ulverston, and further north of both towns".

The first blast furnaces had been brought into operation at Barrow in 1859. (Note: actually October 1858) Proximity to mines, and to Barrow harbour, and "the advantage of obtaining coke and coal as return freights from the places to which hematite ore was carried" had allowed "extraordinary economy and consequent commercial success.”:

"But there was another fact still more decisive and important for the prosperity of the Barrow blast furnaces and for the prosperity of the whole mining district surrounding them, and that was the adoption of the Bessemer process. No sooner had Mr. Bessemer's great invention got into practical use than there arose an almost unlimited demand for pure hematite iron."

Witnesses for the Furness and Midland Joint Bill reported that in 1862 over 535,000 tons of iron ore had been raised in Furness (in 1873 the market price of haematite ore was 24-30 shillings per ton) and over 90,000 tons of pig iron produced in local blast furnaces.

In 1860, there were four blast furnaces in operation at Barrow, with the number increasing to seven in 1862, ten in 1866, and eleven in 1867. The Barrow Hematite Steel Company operating what was then "the largest Bessemer steel works in the country" and "one of the largest in the world". The dukes of Devonshire and Buccleuch were both major shareholders in the steel company as was the managing director of the Furness Railway, who was also the managing director of the Hematite Steel Company and (following the incorporation in 1867 of Barrow) its first mayor. (Similarly, after the Phoenix Park Murders, Lord Frederick Cavendish was said to have been a director of the Furness Railway, the Barrow Hematite Steel Company, the Barrow Jute and Flax Company, and the Barrow Shipbuilding Company.)

The docks at Barrow opened in September 1867. There were two wet docks; the Devonshire (30 acres) and the Buccleuch (33 acres). The Midland Railway's Morecambe-Belfast steamer service was replaced by a Barrow-Belfast service jointly owned by the Midland and the FR; a service to Douglas was also run in the summer months, but both services ran from Piel pier transferring to Barrow docks in 1881. In 1872, the FR obtained powers to build a third dock (the Ramsden); the spoil from the excavation of this was used to enclose an area of water intended for the construction of a fourth (the Cavendish).

The original main line did not run through Barrow, though its headquarters and engineering works were adjacent to St. George's Square. Through trains had to run into the terminal station and then out again to continue their journey. In 1882, through working became possible when a new station called Barrow Central was opened on a new loop line; the Whitehaven-Carnforth passenger traffic now started to running over this section. The old station at the dockside was retained as the goods station.

=== Issues with development outside Barrow ===
Heavy expenditure on the docks at Barrow coincided with a down-turn in the iron trade in the mid-1870s; capital expenditure on other projects was minimised, and the dividend was cut from 10% to 6.5%. This triggered complaints from shareholders that the directors were pursuing the development of Barrow at the expense of the profitability of the FR, and from passengers at the service provided – with the possible exception of fast trains serving Barrow (which did not stop at most stations) FR passenger trains were infrequent, inconvenient, unpunctual, uncomfortable, and slow.

The Directors rely too much on the mineral traffic and ignore the cultivation of the passenger traffic. A glance at the timetables shows that it is almost impossible to reach some of the most beautiful places on Morecambe Bay in anything like reasonable time, and the accommodation at Carnforth, when the delay takes place, is most miserable. On the Furness side of the line there are two seats for about 200 passengers, one waiting room, and one refreshment room, which is frequently so crammed that many people cannot get to the counter. Added to this inconvenience, travellers who have to wait here are oppressed with a sense of the general dirtiness of the station. The trains also run at inconvenient times, and the waiting for them at Carnforth involves great loss of valuable time. There is no train that takes passengers from Lancaster to Silverdale under forty-five minutes, a distance of ten miles! The slowest train being an hour and thirty-five minutes. These are the advertised times, but the trains are not infrequently late, consequently a good walker might almost accomplish the journey on foot in the time.

The company chairman (the Duke of Devonshire) subsequently conceded that several of the stations "... until lately, were in a condition of which the public had a right to complain ... On the Whitehaven section especially some of the stations were of the most inferior description, and such as the Board of Trade would not have allowed them to continue; they were mere temporary structure, scarcely more than wooden hovels."

=== Hard times ===
In 1881, revenue for the second half of the year was about £300,000 and the dividend 7% a year; second-half revenue declined to £216,000 in 1885 (with the dividend being cut to 2%), but recovered to £275,000 in 1889, allowing a dividend of 5% a year. In 1892, there was no dividend for the first year-half (because of a prolonged strike in the Durham coalfield) this triggered a renewal of previous complaints from shareholders that the company had sunk between two and three million pounds into docks at Barrow, but refused to give any indication of the profitability (or otherwise) of the docks. The additional complaint was now made that most of the directors were ornamental and deferred to Sir James Ramsden who had held managerial posts with the company since 1846, and had been the managing director since 1866. (Note: His multiple directorships and shareholdings were also criticised, although only on the grounds that he was spreading himself thin. The conflict of interest between the railway and the steelworks which was one of its principal customers was not mentioned until 1900, when the then Duke of Devonshire told shareholders: "Sometimes as chairman of the Steel Company it would be his duty to resist the immoderate demands of the railway company, while as chairman of the latter company, it would sometimes be his duty to protest against the pretensions of the steel company. In these matters, however, he tried to act as an impartial arbitrator, but he thought the shareholders' interests were very well protected by their deputy-chairman. (Hear, hear) He thought it only right to call their attention to his somewhat anomalous position in this matter.") For the second half of 1892, despite the disruption to traffic and loss of an engine caused by subsidence at Lindal, a dividend at the rate of 3% a year was declared; amendments seeking to force the resignation of Sir James were moved, but defeated.

The secretary of the FR denied that its low dividends were caused by injudicious expenditure on Barrow docks; without them there would be no dividend at all:

"The docks have led to the development of many industries in Barrow and the establishment of many feeders to our line".

The problem was foreign competition:

"..the introduction of Spanish ore into England has led to a serious diminution of the receipts of the Furness Railway company owing to the reduction in price it has affected all over the country in pig iron and steel; and whereas we used to send away nearly half a million tons of ore to Middlesbrough and other places at rates which gave us an average of 3s. a ton, we are now carrying that ore – in less quantities, I am sorry to say – to the furnaces at short distances, and we get an average of only 1s. a ton, Therefore it is not the docks which have reduced our dividends, but the introduction of Spanish ore and the altered circumstances of the trade."

In 1894, it was reported that only 33 of the 75 blast furnaces in Furness and West Cumberland were working.

=== Management changes ===
In May 1895, Sir James Ramsden, by now 73, resigned due to ill health. He was not replaced as managing director. A new general manager (Alfred Aslett) was recruited from the Cambrian Railways, where he had 'worked wonders ... from being one of the most sluggish it has become one of the most enterprising lines in the kingdom'. The incumbent 'secretary and general manager' became 'secretary' only (his assistant, Ramsden's son, became 'superintendent of the line') before retiring in 1897 after thirty-three years in the post; the locomotive superintendent retired at the same time after forty-six years with the company. (Note: as did the carriage & wagon superintendent, who would appear to have been with the company for over thirty years; when the company's accountant retired in 1897 he was noted to have been with the company forty-one years. The company secretary had also completed forty years of service, having been appointed company secretary and manager of the Whitehaven and Furness Junction Railway in 1856; both he and the locomotive superintendent were born c. 1820. Ramsden junior served as 'superintendent of the line' until retiring in 1908 – he was then appointed to the board of the FR at the earliest opportunity and went on to become chairman of the FR and (post-grouping) a director of the LM&S)

The new regime benefited from a recovery in the Furness iron and steel trade, and from a wholesale replacement of passenger rolling stock occasioned by the need to provide a continuous automatic brake, but also made strenuous efforts to develop passenger traffic, with day and weekend excursion tickets being introduced and advertised. Second class was abolished (1897) and new corridor bogie carriages introduced on Barrow-Yorkshire services were as good as anything to be found on major railways.

To promote tourist traffic, the FR published guides to tours in the Lake District not only in English, but also in French and German. By 1903, passenger revenue was 40% higher than that for 1895, and passenger revenue per train-mile was 10d higher. The Railway Magazine of August 1898 described the Furness Railway as one "which, though a comparatively small line, is noted for its enterprise and go-ahead management."; by the second half of 1899 the dividend had recovered to 4% per annum, "entirely due to the ability an exertions of their excellent general manager" according to the company chairman. The dividend, however, fell back to 0.5% in 1904 because of a renewed depression in iron and steel; Mr Aslett having previously reported that pig iron could only be produced in Furness at a loss of 3s 6d per ton: England was the 'dumping ground' for German iron being sold at below its production cost. Vickers had taken over the Barrow Shipbuilding Company in 1897, and its construction of naval warships at Barrow (both as part of the Anglo-German naval arms race and for foreign navies) became an important prop of the prosperity of Barrow. Even with this prop, and the development of tourist traffic, the FR dividend for the last twenty-five years of its existence (up to Grouping in 1923) averaged only marginally above 2% a year.

=== Relationship with the Midland Railway ===
The FR had been closely associated with the Midland Railway for many years; it was strategically important to the Midland as giving it access to an Irish Sea port and hence to Irish traffic. The Midland had repeatedly attempted to purchase the company, but these offers had come during periods of prosperity for the Furness, whose directors had rebuffed the Midland's terms as insufficiently generous. The Midland's announcement of a planned extension of its Morecambe line to a new deep-water port at Heysham gave rise to concern about the future of steamer services from Barrow and the reliability of the Midland as a partner.

Negotiations with the Midland led to a further offer to purchase the FR (with a guaranteed 3% dividend to FR shareholders) which was again rejected, and ended in an agreement that the joint Furness/Midland trains from Barrow would continue to run, and the same company which managed (and owned a third of the shares in) the Barrow trains for the railways would also manage the services from Heysham. When services began running from Heysham in 1905, the Barrow services became unprofitable: it became evident that the Midland was preferentially routing traffic via Heysham and the Furness went to law, the matter being resolved by the Midland buying out the FR's interest for £45,000, entering a traffic-sharing agreement for Belfast traffic and undertaking to continue the services from Barrow for seven years.

== Locomotive superintendents ==
- James Ramsden, 1846–1850
- Richard Mason, 1850–1896
- W. F. Pettigrew, 1896–1918
- David Rutherford, 1918–1923

== Locomotives ==
The first locomotive superintendent, recruited from Bury, Curtis and Kennedy in 1846, was later to be knighted as Sir James Ramsden, a leading civic figure and first Mayor of Barrow. No locomotives were actually built in the local works itself: they were generally standard designs, purchased from other manufacturers. By 1921, fifteen different works were represented. However, W. F. Pettigrew, who had taken over operations in 1896, was to introduce some measure of standardisation.

There were also carriage and wagon-building shops, and repairs and maintenance was carried out on the equipment of Barrow Docks.

== Line details ==
- Viaducts: The line crosses several major estuaries - the rivers Kent and Leven being among them - over substantial viaducts.
- Tunnel: the Bransty Tunnel in Whitehaven is 1,333 yards (1,219 m) in length
- Total mileage (lines owned or worked) (1912): 190.25 miles (306.18 km).

== Barrow Docks ==
Details given are those shown for 1912:

- Total area of water: 278 acres (113 ha)
- Four docks: Devonshire; Buccleuch; Ramsden; and Cavendish. There was also a Timber Dock.
- Length of quays 2.25 miles (3.62 km)
- Messrs Vickers built major ships for the Royal Navy here
- There was also a deep water berth in Walney Channel

== Ships ==
Barrow-Fleetwood service - four paddle steamers; lake steamers - two on Coniston Water; six on Windermere; three Barrow steam tugs

=== Barrow-Fleetwood ===
Ship	Launched	Tonnage (GRT)	Notes
Lady Evelyn	1900	295 (1900–04); 342 (1904–40)	Built by J.Scott and Co., of Kinghorn. Lengthened in 1904. Requisitioned by the Admiralty in 1914 for minesweeping work and was based at Larne. Decommissioned in 1918 and was sold in 1920 to W H Tucker & Co Ltd., of Cardiff. Sold in 1923 (September 1921 according to Haws) to P & A Campbell Ltd and renamed Brighton Belle. Taken over by Admiralty again in 1939 but hit a wreck in The Downs on 28 May 1940 and sank.
Lady Margaret	1895	369	Built by A.McMillan and Son at Dumbarton for Bristol Channel service between Cardiff and Weston-super-Mare. Purchased in 1896 by P & A Campbell Ltd. They re-sold the vessel to Furness Railway in 1903. Sold to the Admiralty in 1908 (1912 according to Haws) for use as a tender and renamed Liberty. Renamed Wanderer in 1913 and Roamer in 1919. Scrapped in 1923.
Lady Moyra	1905	562	Built by John Brown and Company at Clydebank for the Barry Railway in 1905 as Gwalia and worked the Barry - Cardiff- Ilfracombe route. Bought in May 1910 for £22,750 and renamed Lady Moyra. Requisitioned during the First World War for minesweeping duties alongside "Lady Evelyn" and subsequently returned to the FR. Sold to W.H.Tucker in 1919 for his 'Yellow Funnel' fleet and acquired at auction in 1933 (1921 according to Haws) by P & A Campbell Ltd and renamed Brighton Queen. Bombed on 1 June 1940 and sunk at Dunkirk.
Philomel	1889	564	Built by J.Scott of Kirkaldy. Tonnage 662 according to Haws. Bought from the General Steam Navigation Company for £5,250 in 1908 having been employed by them on the Thames. Scrapped at Preston in November 1913.

=== Coniston Water ===
Ship	Launched	Tonnage (GRT)	Notes
Gondola	1859	42	Built by Jones, Quiggin and Co., of Liverpool. In service until the First World War, then resumed service after the war until 1936. Converted to a houseboat in 1945. To the National Trust in 1978. Restored and returned to service in 1979.
Lady of the Lake	1859		In service until 1908 when replaced by another boat of the same name.
Lady of the Lake	1908	76	Built by Thorneycroft's of Southampton. Transferred to the London, Midland and Scottish Railway (LMS) in 1923, was re-engined in 1934 and fitted with a new squat funnel. In service until 1939 when laid up at the outbreak of war. The Coniston sailings were never restarted and the vessel was dismantled in 1950.

=== Windermere ===
Ship	Launched	Tonnage (GRT)	Notes
Britannia	1879	64	Built by T.B. Seath & Co. at Rutherglen for Colonel Ridehalgh [ 'Lt-Col Greenhalgh' according to Haws ] at a cost of £12,000. Bought by FR in 1908 for £550. Laid up due to war and did not re-enter service. Scrapped in 1918 at Lakeside.
Cygnet	1879	52	Built by Barrow Shipbuilding Co., at Barrow at cost of £3,400. Capacity 326 passengers. To LMS in 1923 and the British Transport Commission (BTC) in 1948 having been re-engined in 1924. Scrapped in 1955.
Raven	1871	42	Cargo boat built by T.B.Seath at Rutherglen. Used by Royal Flying Corps as a tender on the lake in connection with mine dropping exercises in 1917. Withdrawn from service in 1927 and sold to Vickers Ltd. Sank at moorings but was raised in 1955 and re-built. Preserved at the Windermere Steamboat Museum.
Rothay	1865	58	Built for Windermere United Steam Yacht Co in 1865 by Lancaster Shipbuilding Co., Lancaster. Bought by FR in 1869. Withdrawn in 1900 and scrapped in 1922.
Swan	1869	71	Built by T.B.Seath of Rutherglen for the Windermere United Steam Yacht Co. at a cost of £4,000. Taken over by Furness Railway in 1872. Sank during 'Great Gale' of 1891 at her moorings but was salved only to sink again following a collision with Tern off Ambleside in 1901. She was again salved and transferred to the LMS in 1923. Eventually withdrawn at the end of the 1937 season and broken up in early 1938.
Swift (1900)	1900		Built by TB Seath of Rutherglen, Glasgow 1900. Capacity 780 passengers. Diesel engine fitted in 1958. Scrapped in 1998.
Teal	1879	52	Built by Barrow Shipbuilding Co. at Barrow with capacity for 326 passengers - a sister of Cygnet and shared same history except that she never converted to oil. Sank at Lakeside moorings in 'Great Gale' of 1891, but was salved. Withdrawn and broken up in 1927.
Tern	1891	120	Built by Forrest & Sons, Wivenhoe, Essex at cost of £5,000. Capacity 633 passengers. Hit and sank Swan in 1901. Transferred to LMS and BTC in 1923 and 1948 respectively. Re-engined in 1958 and was transferred to Sealink in 1979. Was further taken over in 1984 by Sea Containers Ltd., and is operated by Orient Express Hotels Ltd. Still in service with Windermere Lake Cruises.

=== Other Furness Railway ships ===
Ship	Launched	Tonnage (GRT)	Notes
Arthur Gordon	1854	136	Sold in 1858 to James Fisher, Barrow in Furness. Sank on 6 March 1860 after colliding with ST Independence off the West Hoyle Bank.
Cartmel	1907	304	Tug built by Vickers, Sons & Maxim Ltd., of Barrow and based at Barrow. Transferred to LMS in 1923. Sold in 1934 to Leith Salvage Ltd and renamed Bullger. Struck a mine on 13 March 1941 and sank in Druridge Bay.
Furness	1898	225	Built by J.P.Rennoldson at South Shields. A tug based at Barrow. Served until 1937 when was scrapped at Barrow.
Lismore	1874	181	Tug built by Barrow Shipbuilding Co. for Lord Cavendish and Sir J. Ramsden and based at Barrow. Not taken over by LMS in 1923. Sold to William Cooper and Sons of Liverpool.
Walney	1868	200	Seagoing tug with salvage capability built by McNab and Co., of Greenock for Furness directors Lord Cavendish and Sir J. Ramsden. Based at Barrow. Re-boilered in 1877. Sold in 1897 to C.W.Duncan and Co. of Middlesbrough and renamed "Camperdown".Operated excursions to Scarborough. Broken up in 1906.
Walney	1904	204	Tug based at Barrow and built by J.P. Rennoldson at South Shields and which was also recorded as "Walney Ferry". The vessel had a passenger saloon on the foredeck which allowed her to serve as an excursion vessel and for parties attending launches. In winter she had capability to serve Barrow-Fleetwood operation. Transferred to LMS in 1923. Moved to Troon in 1930 when a tug named "Troon" was sold from that base. Eventually scrapped in 1951.

== Other statistics ==
- As at 31 December 1911 the Railway owned rolling stock as follows:
  - 130 locomotives; 348 coaching vehicles; 7766 goods vehicles; 2 steam rail motor cars
  - Locomotives painted Indian red; passenger vehicles ultramarine blue with white upper panels
  - Passengers carried (year ending 31 December 1911) 3,297,622

The Furness Railway operated as an independent company until December 1922, when it was merged as one of the constituent companies of the London, Midland and Scottish Railway following the Railways Act 1921.

== See also ==
- Cleator and Furness Railway
- Cumbrian Coast Line (history)
- Furness and Midland Joint Railway
- Whitehaven, Cleator and Egremont Railway
- Ulverstone and Lancaster Railway
- The Furness Railway Pub and Hotel
