= Bardsea branch =

Disused railway line in Cumbria, England

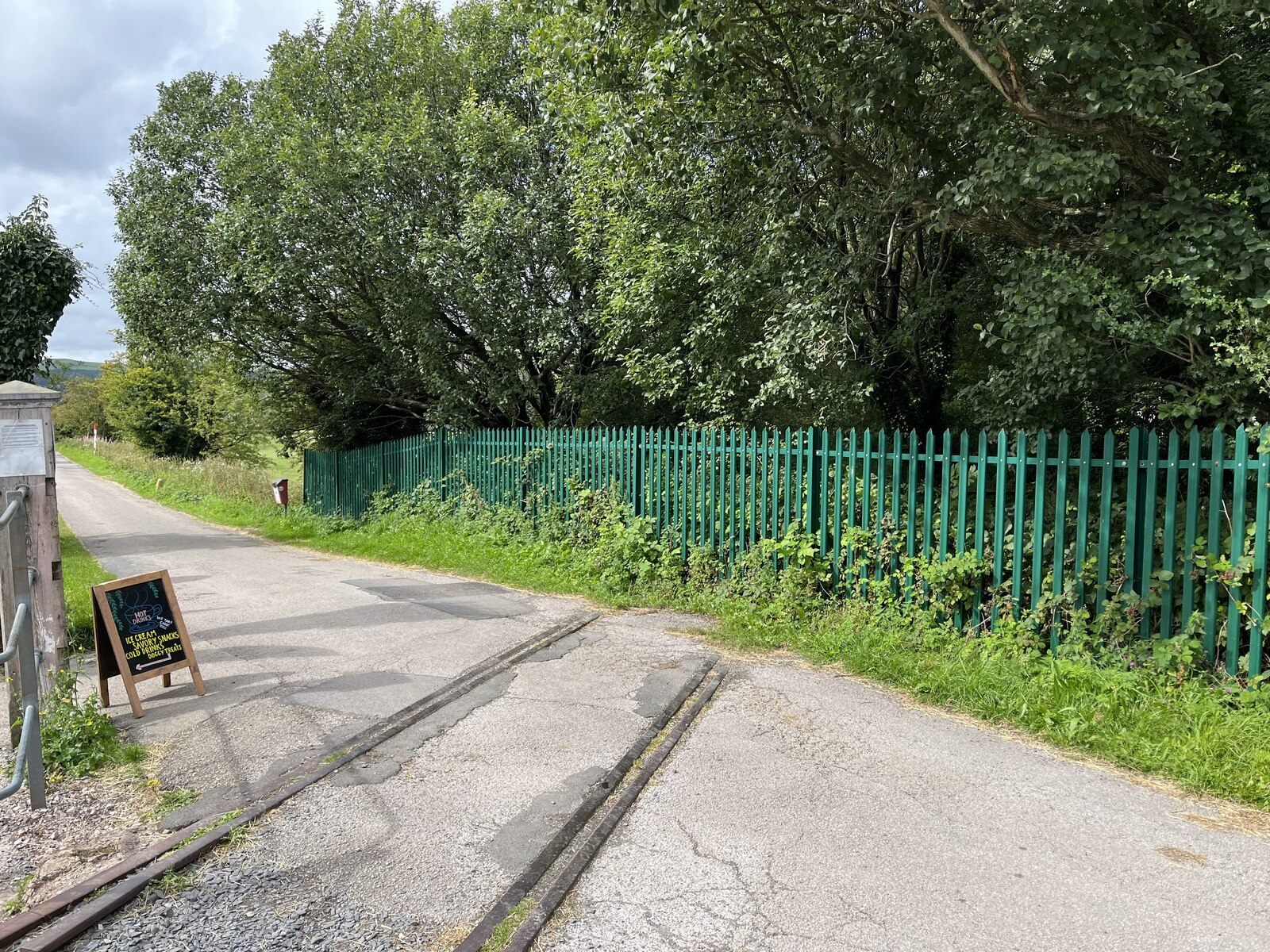
- Extant level crossing on the towpath of the Ulverston Canal

Overview
- Other name: Conishead Priory branch
- Status: Closed
- Owner: Furness Railway; LMS; British Rail
- Locale: Cumbria, England
- Termini: Plumpton Junction; Conishead Priory station
- Stations: 2

Service
- Type: Heavy rail

History
- Opened: 27 June 1883
- Closed to passengers: December 1916
- Branch singled: 1953
- Closed: 1994
- Track lifted: 2000

Technical
- Line length: 2 mi (3.2 km)
- Number of tracks: 2, later 1
- Track gauge: 1,435 mm (4 ft 8 1/2 in) standard gauge

The Bardsea branch (also known as the Conishead Priory branch) was a short-lived passenger railway to the east of Ulverston in Cumbria, England. Originally intended to be an alternative route to and from Barrow-in-Furness via Gleaston, the line never reached any further south than Conishead Priory station although a trackbed had been constructed almost as far as Bardsea. After closure to passengers in 1916, a stub of the line remained open from Plumpton Junction to the works around North Lonsdale, with rail traffic ceasing in 1994. The line was the last major expansion project of the Furness Railway before its amalgamation.

== History ==
During the 1870s, the Furness Railway considered building a new line to avoid trains having to be banked around Lindal-in-Furness. Whilst the company had thought that their western end of the railway would leave the line at Salthouse, the eastern section from Plumpton Junction gained approval as part of the Furness Railway Act 1876 (39 & 40 Vict. c. cxlvii)). Earthworks were started in November 1878, and the line was fully opened to traffic in June 1883, with Conishead Priory station acting as the end of the branch, with an intermediate station at North Lonsdale Crossing opening in June 1888. The line came to be known as the Bardsea branch, the Conishead Railway, or the Conishead Priory branch, and was the last major expansion project of the Furness Railway, which was amalgamated into the LMS in 1923.

From the outset, freight traffic largely consisted of goods both inward and outward in conjunction with the ironworks at North Lonsdale which had opened in 1874 and closed in 1938. Other freight terminals were located on the various smaller sidings; Mapping from 1913 shows many sidings on either side of the line, a line to Ainslie Pier on the Leven estuary, a line on the south side of the canal serving a paper works and the Ulverston Canal basin, and a line branching away from North Lonsdale Crossing south-westwards to Gascow Quarry. A connection from the Gascow Quarry line ran underneath the Bardsea Branch which enabled limestone to be delivered directly into the ironworks without conflicting on the 1874 branch line.

The first branch in the area ran alongside the south side of Ulverston Canal; it was connected in 1874, and left the main line after Ulverston station just before the railway crossed the canal over Ulverston Viaduct. The branch ran for 33 chains (2,200 ft; 660 m) with a siding under the viaduct to the canal basin area. Under the Furness Railway Act 1881 (44 & 45 Vict. c. clxxxviii), the direct line from Ulverston was disconnected in 1882, and the southern end connected to the newer Bardsea branch.

At the outset, the passenger service consisted of two daily mixed traffic workings, which provided either a 36 minute stay at Conishead, or a 4-hour stay until the second daily train arrived and left. Passenger footfall was low, and so the service was soon curtailed into just one daily out and back working for passengers on weekdays only. The single daily train left Ulverston, the junction station for the branch, (Note: Ulverston station had a running-in board which stated "Ulverston. Junction for Lakeside Windermere and Conishead Priory.) around midday, taking 12 minutes to run the entire branch including a reversal at Plumpton Junction, and on arrival at Conishead Priory station, it waited six minutes before returning to Ulverston. The local populous claimed that the single train working was a ruse to get travellers to spend the night at Conishead Priory Hydro.

Of the two stations on the line, North Lonsdale Crossing halt, and Conishead Priory, only Conishead was originally advertised as a passenger station, with the Railway Clearing House assessment of stations in 1904 listing it as having no goods facilities. North Lonsdale Crossing halt later appeared in Bradshaw's timetables, but the sole passenger train ceased to run in December 1916, with both stations closing to passengers. The Furness Railway ran traffic along the line until its amalgamation into the LMS in 1923, then after 1948, traffic was run by British Railways. Under British Railways, the line gained an engineer's line reference of GXO.

Signalling on the line was controlled by boxes at Plumpton Junction, Canal Signal Box, which was on the south side of the canal, and the crossing at North Lonsdale. The triangular junction east of Plumpton, also had a signal box where the lines diverged onto the Lakeside Branch; Greenodd Junction at the north, and Leven Junction in the east, which was at the western end of Leven Viaduct. The box at North Lonsdale Crossing closed in 1933, but re-opened in 1937 due to a resurgent iron and steel blast furnace. It continued to operate the crossing gates over the road, but by the 1960s, it was redundant and vandalised. A ground frame was built into the station building at Conishead Priory, which worked the points there. The various terminals on the Canal Branch closed one by one from the 1930s onwards, so that by the early 1960s, only the Ulverston gas works was using the branch, but this too closed to traffic in late 1996, and the branch closed at the same time.

The branch ran slightly downhill from Plumpton Junction to the canal, and thereafter was mostly level until a small uphill section into Priory station. It was built with two tracks, in the hope that it would provide an alternative route around the coast to Barrow, but after traffic stopped in 1916 to Conishead, with only freight workings remaining, the branch was singled in 1953 from Plumpton Junction. From 1967 until closure in 1994, traffic on the branch consisted of fuel oil, caustic soda and solvents to the Glaxo works, which were shunted by Glaxo's own fireless steam locomotive. (Note: For the last two years of the branch's life, the sidings were shunted by a Class 08 shunter after the fireless steam locomotive failed.) The last train to use the branch was the Royal Train in May 1995, when it was stabled overnight.

=== Plumpton Junction ===
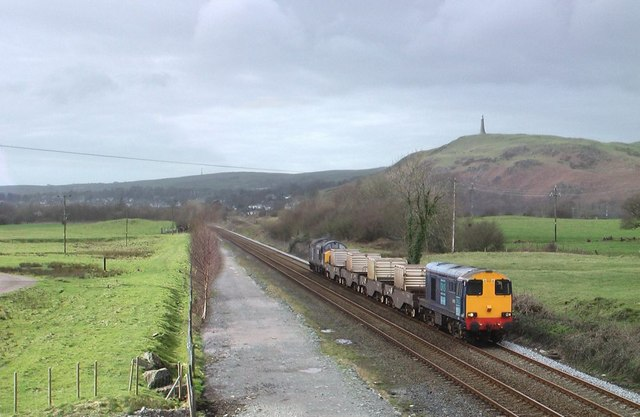
The site of Plumpton Junction

Plumpton Junction was 1.5 miles (2.4 km) east of Ulverston railway station, and sat at the point where the lines radiated to Ulverston (westwards), Conishead Priory (southwards), Lakeside (northwards), and the line across Leven Viaduct on to Cark and Cartmel (eastwards). It also had sidings in which banking engines would wait between duties. Banking engines westwards towards Ulverston were not available until 7:00 am each day, if a freight train needed to go west before this time, it could split its load at PLumpton Junction, and make a total of three runs up the bank if necessary.

The Furness Railway considered building an interchange station at Plumpton Junction, as it had been the intent to carry the railway around the headland through Gleaston and into Barrow to avoid the gradients at Lindal-in-Furness. The gradients of the line over the summit at Lindal meant that heavy coke trains had to be banked westwards, and sometimes, even the empty wagons had to be banked eastwards. The climb westwards from Plumpton Junction was 4 miles (6.4 km), and steepened to 1-in-76 in places. The Furness railway had placed a turntable at the west end of the junction, but its removal meant that trains could not turned easily, so the company installed a eastward-facing chord on the Plumpton quarry branch, which ran into the sidings extending past the signal box allowing engines to be turned in a manner that was cheaper than installing a new turntable.

After an accident on the Leven Viaduct during strong winds, an anenometer was installed at the west end of the viaduct which rang a bell in Leven Junction signal box (and at another signal box on the other side of the viaduct) if the wind speed was too great to allow trains to pass over the viaduct. Plumpton Junction signal box was amended to carry out the wind gauge function when Leven Junction box closed in 1952, and the wind gauge was replaced by an upgraded version in 1977. The signal box, which was built by the Furness Railway in 1897, was demolished in March 2000, at the same time as the remaining stub of the former Bardsea branch was removed, and all signalling was transferred to Ulverston station box.

== Stations and features ==
Feature	Description	Mile and chainage	Coordinates	Ref
Plumpton Junction	Junction of the almost 2-mile (3 km) line.	0.00	54.2005°N 3.0632°W	
Ulverston Canal rolling bridge	Sliding bridge over the Ulverston Canal. Still in situ, now grade II listed.	0 miles 46 chains (0.93 km)	54.1937°N 3.0679°W	
North Lonsdale Crossing Halt	Quick states the station closed in June 1916.	0 miles 76 chains (1.5 km)	54.1883°N 3.0646°W	
Conishead Priory station	The terminus at the southern end of the branch. The station officially closed on 1 January 1917, and the station building became a private dwelling.	1 mile 58 chains (2.8 km); Rails ended at 1 mile 70 chains (3 km).	54.1754°N 3.0626°W	
Red Lane	The point at which the trackbed ends, although rails were not in place south of Conishead Priory station. Red Lane is so called due to the haematite moved along it from Lindal mines on their way across Morecambe Bay, before the railways arrived.		54.1669°N 3.06354°W	
