= Ulverston Canal rolling bridge =

Disused railway bridge in Cumbria, England

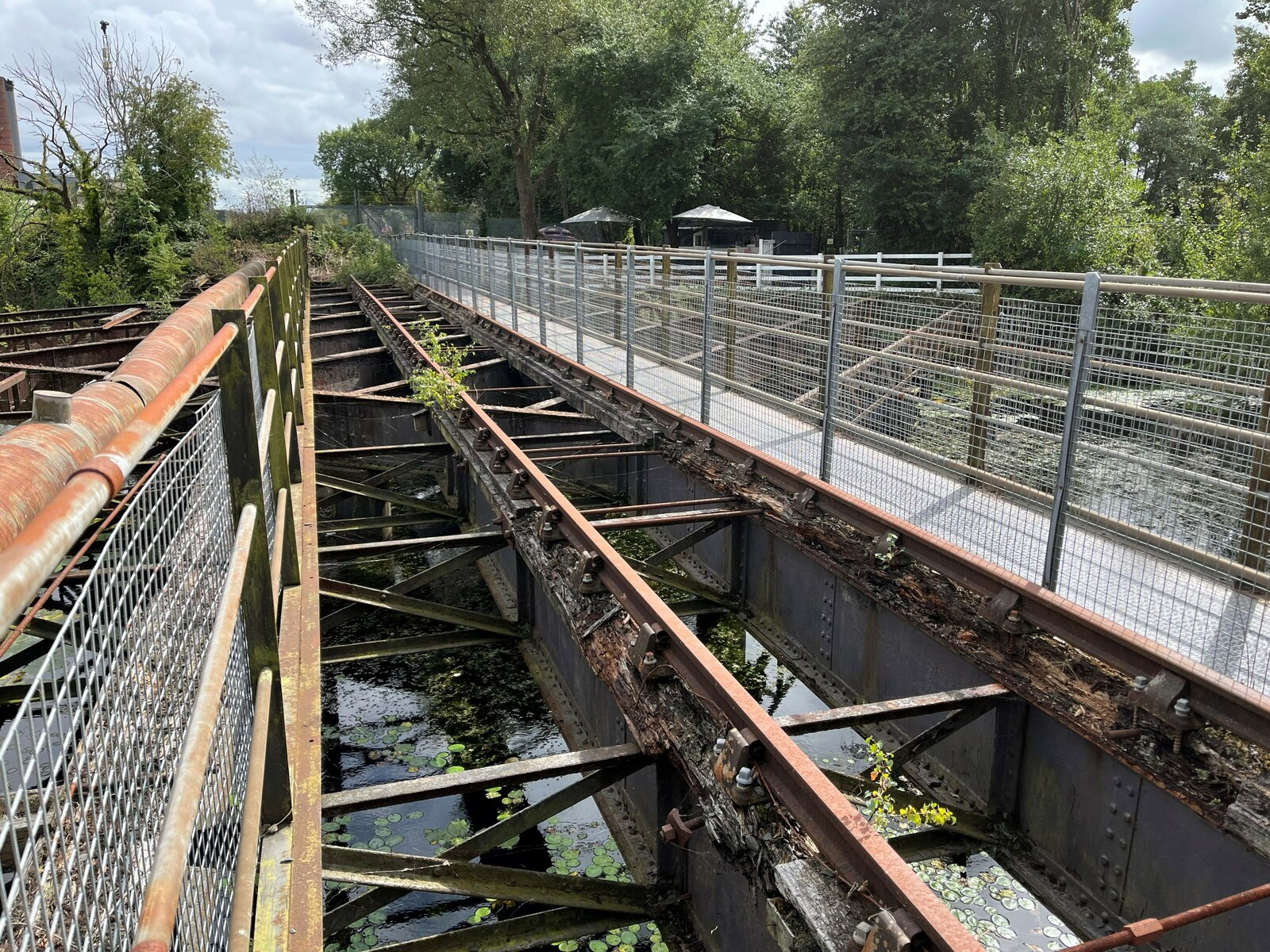
- The bridge with one set of rails, and a footway on the right
- Coordinates: 54.1936°N 3.0679°W
- OS grid reference: SD304780
- Crosses: Ulverston Canal
- Locale: Ulverston, Cumbria, England
- Preceded by: Six Arches Viaduct
- Followed by: Canal Foot Bridge

Characteristics
- Material: Steel

Rail characteristics
- No. of tracks: 1 (originally 2)
- Track gauge: 1,435 mm (4 ft 8 1/2 in) standard gauge

History
- Designer: Francis Stileman
- Construction cost: £5,198
- Opened: July 1882
- Closed: 1994

Location
- Interactive map of Ulverston Canal rolling bridge

Ulverston Canal rolling bridge is a disused railway bridge which crosses the Ulverston Canal in Cumbria, England. The railway line opened in 1882 to provide an alternative route around the coast to Barrow-in-Furness, but the line never passed Conishead Priory just south of the canal. Passenger services soon stopped on the branch, though freight trains continued to use it until the 1990s. The bridge is still extant and is now grade II listed; it is believed to be the only example of its type (19th century origin) in England, though a contemporary bridge at Keadby from the 20th century is still in daily use by the railway.

== History ==
In July 1882, the first section of the Bardsea branch railway opened south from Plumpton Junction on the Furness Railway in Cumbria. The line was initially intended to act as a new route around the coast to Barrow-in-Furness, avoiding the need for trains to be banked up the gradient at Lindal-in-Furness. The crossing of Ulverston Canal required a bridge, but due to weight and length considerations, a rolling bridge was decided upon as a swing bridge would weigh 140 tonnes (150 tons), and be at least 112 feet (34 m) long. A traversing bridge would be of similar dimensions, but additionally the machinery for such a bridge would have been more expensive.

The steel-girder bridge, which crosses the canal on a skew compared to the canal formation, slid open sideways on iron wheels at a 48 degree angle, with a whole section of the bridge, 62 feet (19 m) in width, being able to be slid out of the way into a recess on the south bank of the canal. The depth of the recess was 28 feet 6 inches (8.69 m), which would provided a width clearance for vessels using the canal of 27 feet (8.2 m). Power for the bridge was supplied by a series of hydraulic rams, with water for this purpose being stored in an accumulator tower situated on the south side of the canal; the location of a public road and the towpath on the northern side of the canal prevented a suitable position for the tower there. The bridge and associated works were designed by the resident chief engineer of the Furness Railway at that time, Francis Stileman.

Stileman opted to use cast iron screw piles, as this would have the least detrimental effect on the bed of the waterway, and also would provide the stability needed due to distributing the load more widely. The screw piles also had a benefit for the structure as Stileman could not find a suitable rock strata to anchor to, despite digging down to 34 feet (10 m) below what would be the rail level. The entire structure, the foundations, ancillary works, the tower and hydraulic machinery came to a total cost of £5,198 (equivalent to £661,000 in 2023). Although the branch to Conishead Priory did not fully open until 1883, the records of the Furness Railway detail that the Ulverston Canal signal box and bridge, opened for traffic at the end of July 1882.

The canal bridge is still extant, though it has been locked in place since the branch was singled in 1952/1953, and all associated hydraulic equipment was removed at the same time. The line saw its last regular traffic in 1994, then the Royal Train was the last official train to use the branch overnight in May 1995. The line was formally closed and lifted in 2000, when the signal box at Plumpton Junction was removed. A single set of rails is still set into the structure and a footway occupies one side of the bridge allowing pedestrians access to both sides of the canal.

A report from 2004 recommends leaving the "sliding bridge" located in the open position, locating the service pipe that uses it somewhere else, and providing a new footbridge for access. The bridge being "slid" into the open position will allow watercraft to use the canal again. The canal was abandoned in 1945 (Note: The canal was purchased by the Furness Railway company, later becoming an LMS railway asset, which they then sold in 1946.) and GSK owned the canal between 1974 and 2010, using it as an emergency water source, but they sold it to the Ulverston Canal Company so the canal could be preserved. The bridge has a pipe which carries fresh water from Newland Beck into the Glaxo plant.

The bridge is believed to be the only example of its type still in existence in England, though a sliding bridge at Keadby in Lincolnshire is also still in daily use, but has a different design and it dates from the 20th century, whilst the Ulverston Canal bridge is from the 1880s. Both the bridge and the accumulator tower are grade II listed.

The extant railway viaduct which carries the Furness Line over the canal near canal head, is known as Six Arches Viaduct, and each of the six arches has a 45 feet (14 m) span.

== See also ==
- Listed buildings in Ulverston
