= Listed buildings in Ulverston =

Ulverston is a civil parish in the Westmorland and Furness district of Cumbria, England. It contains 149 listed buildings that are recorded in the National Heritage List for England. Of these, five are listed at Grade II*, the middle of the three grades, and the others are at Grade II, the lowest grade. The parish contains the market town of Ulverston and the surrounding countryside. A high proportion of the listed buildings are in or near the town centre, and most of these are shops and houses with associated structures. In the parish is the Ulverston Canal, and there are three listed buildings associated with this. The other listed buildings include churches, public houses, banks, hotels, civic buildings, an animal pound, memorials, railway stations, and a former drill hall.

== Key ==
Grade	Criteria
II*	Particularly important buildings of more than special interest
II	Buildings of national importance and special interest

== Buildings ==
Name and location	Photograph	Date	Notes	Grade
St Mary's Church; 54.19895°N 3.09151°W		16th century	The oldest part of the church is the tower, the body of the church being substantially rebuilt in 1864–66 by E. G. Paley, and the east end of the chancel was extended in 1903–04 by Austin and Paley, who also converted the south chancel aisle into a war memorial chapel in 1923. The church is built in limestone and sandstone with dressings in red sandstone, and has slate roofs. It consists of a nave with a clerestory, north and south aisles, a south porch, a chancel, and a west tower. The tower has three stages, angle buttresses, and an embattled parapet. The inner doorway in the porch is Norman; it has been re-set in this position, and is not complete.	II*
Old Daltongate House; 54.19587°N 3.09748°W	—	c. 1600	The house was altered and refronted in the mid 18th century. It is roughcast with stone dressings, a band between storeys, and a slate roof. There are two storeys, three bays, and a rear wing, giving an L-shaped plan. The windows are sashes, all but one with three lights. The central doorway has a plain surround, a fanlight, and a hood on fluted brackets.	II
Swarthmoor Hall; 54.18637°N 3.10191°W		Early 17th century	A large roughcast house, with sandstone dressings and a slate roof. It has an L-shaped plan, and two storeys with an attic. The windows are mullioned, and the doorway has a chamfered surround and an embattled lintel. On the east front is a canted bay window.	II*
33 and 35 Soutergate; 54.19822°N 3.09610°W	—	17th century (probable)	The house is roughcast with a slate roof, two low storeys and three bays. One window is bowed, and the others are sashes. The doorway has a moulded surround, impost blocks, and a stone hood on fluted brackets.	II
78 Soutergate; 54.19917°N 3.09590°W	—	17th century	The house was altered in the 19th century. It is roughcast with a slate roof, two storeys and four irregular bays. The windows are sashes, and the doorway has a plain surround.	II
Dragley Beck Cottage; 54.18895°N 3.08901°W		17th century	A roughcast cottage with a slate roof, consisting of one storey with a loft, an outshut at the rear, and two outshuts on the right. On the front is a doorway flanked by two casement windows, and there is a mullioned attic window on the right. It is the birthplace of Sir John Barrow	II
Rose and Crown Public House; 54.19670°N 3.09573°W		17th century	The public house is roughcast and has a slate roof and two low storeys. The windows are sashes, and above the ground floor windows are triangular tops with incised ornament. At the left is a doorway leading to a yard. Above the main doorway is a stone hood on brackets.	II
2 and 4 King Street; 54.19610°N 3.09618°W	—	Late 17th century (possible)	A shop with living accommodation above, it is rendered with a slate roof and two storeys. The ground floor contains a shop front with a timber fascia and cornice. In the upper floor are two sash windows and one blind window.	II
Ivy Cottage; 54.18960°N 3.09028°W	—	Late 17th century (probable)	The cottage was extended to the left in the 19th century. It is pebbledashed with slate roofs, and most of the windows are casements. The original part has one storey with an attic, and two bays. The doorway is in the centre, and in the attic are two gabled dormers. The extension has two storeys, one bay, and a doorway to the right.	II
The Nook; 54.17788°N 3.10433°W	—	Late 17th century	A roughcast house with a slate roof, two storeys and three bays. The windows are 20th-century casements. The doorway in the central bay has a rendered surround and a hood mould. At the rear is an outshut, and a gabled wing containing a mullioned window.	II
Friends' Meeting House; 54.18264°N 3.09895°W	—	1688	The meeting house is roughcast with sandstone dressings, a slate-hung gable wall, a slate roof, and two storeys. On the front is a porch on a sandstone plinth with a moulded doorway and an inscribed lintel. To the left of the porch are three casement windows, and to the right are two mullioned windows. Attached to the right of the hall is a converted stable block that has a door to the left with a canopy, and to the right a former doorway with a glazed screen.	II*
28 Soutergate, wall and railings 54.19782°N 3.09576°W	—	Early to mid 18th century	A pebbledashed house with an eaves band, and a slate roof. It has two storeys, a front of three irregular bays, and sash windows. The doorway, to the right of centre, is approached by four steps and has a moulded surround and a cornice on shaped brackets. The forecourt is enclosed by a low stone wall with cast iron railings in a Chinese Chippendale pattern.	II
9 and 9A Market Place; 54.19599°N 3.09608°W	—	1736	A shop with living accommodation above, it is rendered with stone dressings, chamfered quoins, moulded cornices, and a slate roof, hipped at the left. There are three storeys, and each front has three bays. In the ground floor are stone piers with alternating rustication, and behind these are recessed windows and a corner doorway. Above the piers are semicircular blind arches, and in the upper floors are casement windows with architraves.	II
2 Daltongate; 54.19606°N 3.09665°W	—	Mid 18th century	A house, later a shop with living accommodation above, it is in brick, with stone dressings, chamfered quoins, a moulded cornice gutter, and a slate roof. There are three storeys and four bays. At the right is an entry with a round arch, impost blocks and a keystone. To the left is a shop front with a timber entablature and a dentilled cornice. In the upper floors are sash windows with flat brick arches, projecting keystones, and projecting sills.	II
9 and 11 Fountain Street; 54.19691°N 3.09457°W	—	18th century (probable)	A pair of roughcast houses with a slate roof and two storeys. No. 9 on the left has two bays, a yard entrance to the left, a doorway to the right, and sash windows. The windows in No. 11 are casements, with three in the ground floor and two above, and the doorway is on the right.	II
11 and 11A Market Street; 54.19599°N 3.09558°W	—	18th century	A shop with living accommodation above, it is rendered with a slate roof, three storeys and three bays. In the ground floor is a 20th-century shop front. The windows in the upper floors are sashes, those in the middle floor with segmental heads and architraves.	II
11 Queen Street; 54.19547°N 3.09651°W	—	18th century (probable)	A shop with living accommodation above, it is rendered with a slate roof. There are two storeys and three bays. In the ground floor are shop windows and a doorway with a timber fascia, and in the upper floor are casement windows.	II
34 Soutergate; 54.19802°N 3.09582°W	—	Mid 18th century	A roughcast house with a slate roof, three storeys and two bays. One window is sashed and the others are casements. The central doorway has a surround of red sandstone and a stone hood on brackets.	II
Farmers' Arms Public House; 54.19587°N 3.09675°W		18th century (possible)	The public house is rendered, and has a slate roof, three storeys and three bays. The door has a painted surround, and the windows are sashes.	II
The Globe Inn; 54.19545°N 3.09671°W	—	18th century	A public house, rendered with a slate roof, it has two storeys, cellars, and two bays. Two steps lead up to a central doorway. To the left is a cellar entrance, and the windows are sashes.	II
21 Fountain Street; 54.19682°N 3.09370°W	—	1755	A house, then a club, later converted into flats, it is stuccoed on brick, and has a roof of Lakeland slate. The main part has three storeys with an attic, and four bays, and to the left is a projecting two-storey, two-bay extension. The entrance is in the right bay of the extension, and is approached by steps under a tall round arch. The main block has a sill band, an eaves cornice, and a full-width tympanum containing a lunette.	II
22 and 24 Soutergate; 54.19759°N 3.09562°W	—	1757	A pair of roughcast houses with ashlar dressings, alternating quoins, a band between the floors, an eaves band, a moulded cornice gutter, and a slate roof. There are two storeys, No. 22 on the right has four bays, and No. 24 has two. The windows are sashes, those in the upper floor having sills with brackets. The doorway of No. 24 has a moulded surround and a moulded cornice hood. The doorway of No. 22 has a doorcase with an architrave, a pulvinated frieze with fluted brackets, and a moulded broken pediment containing an urn with gadrooning and a pine cone finial.	II
32 Soutergate and railings 54.19793°N 3.09580°W	—	1759	A pebbledashed house with ashlar dressings, a moulded gutter cornice, and a slate roof containing two roof lights. It has two storeys with an attic and cellars, and a symmetrical front of three bays. The windows are sashes, the window above the central doorway having an architrave and a triangular pediment. Four sandstone steps flanked by railings lead up to a doorway with Tuscan pilasters and a pediment. In the right bay is a cellar opening with an arched head.	II
6 Daltongate; 54.19603°N 3.09697°W	—	Mid to late 18th century	A roughcast house with a slate roof, three storeys and four bays. In the ground floor is a doorway and to the right is a carriage entrance, both with round arches, impost blocks, and keystones, and between them is a cellar opening with a segmental head. The windows are sashes.	II
Old Friends' Inn and railings 54.19854°N 3.09621°W	—	Mid or late 18th century	The public house is roughcast with a cornice gutter and a slate roof. There are two storeys with attics and two bays. The windows are sashes, and in the roof are two gabled dormers with casements. Three steps flanked by railings lead up to the central doorway that has slim engaged Tuscan columns and a flat moulded canopy on fluted and shaped brackets.	II
7 Fountain Street; 54.19695°N 3.09471°W	—	Late 18th century (probable)	A roughcast house with ashlar dressings, bands, a coped parapet, and a slate roof. There are two storeys, attics, a basement, and a symmetrical front of five bays. The windows are sashes, and in the attic are dormers. The doorway has an architrave and a cornice on console brackets, and it is approached by two flights of steps parallel to the front wall.	II
7 King Street; 54.19641°N 3.09622°W	—	Late 18th century	A house on a corner site, later a café with living accommodation, it is stuccoed with stone dressings, quoins, and a slate roof. It has three storeys with attics, two bays on King Street, and three on Upper Brook Street. In the ground floor is a shop front with a timber fascia. The middle floor contains casement windows with architraves and detached pediments above, and in the top floor are sash windows with architraves. The Upper Brook Street front has a doorway with engaged Tuscan columns, an open pediment and a Gothick fanlight, above which is a round-headed stair window.	II
23 King Street; 54.19676°N 3.09602°W	—	Late 18th century (possible)	A shop with living accommodation above, it is rendered, with a moulded cornice gutter, a slate roof, and has three storeys and two bays. In the ground floor is a shop front flanked by fluted pilasters, and to the left is a round-arched entry. In the upper floors are 20th-century casement windows.	II
4 and 5 Market Place; 54.19576°N 3.09642°W	—	Late 18th century	A pair of shops with living accommodation above, rendered with stone dressings, quoins at the right end, a moulded gutter cornice, and a slate roof, hipped at the right. There are three storeys with attics, and each shop has two bays. The windows in the top two storeys are sashes in architraves, with moulded sills on brackets. No. 4 on the right has a shallow canopy over the ground floor, a window to the left and a doorway with an architrave to the right. No. 5 has a shop front with a timber fascia and cornice, and two attic dormers.	II
1 and 3 Queen Street; 54.19569°N 3.09651°W	—	Late 18th century	A shop with living accommodation above, it is rendered with a slate roof, and has three storeys and two bays. In the ground floor is a shop front with a timber fascia, a cornice, and pilaster strips, and there are two doorways to the left. In the upper floors are sash windows with segmental heads, and between the windows in the middle floor is a small oval window.	II
7 Queen Street; 54.19558°N 3.09652°W	—	Late 18th century (probable)	A shop with living accommodation above, it is rendered with a slate roof, and has three storeys and two bays. In the ground floor is a shop front with a recessed central doorway and a timber fascia, and to the right is a yard entry with a flat lintel. In the upper floors are sash windows.	II
30 Soutergate and railings 54.19788°N 3.09577°W	—	Late 18th century	A pebbledashed house with ashlar dressings and an artificial slate roof. There are two storeys and a cellar, and two bays. The windows are casements, and in the roof is a flat-roofer dormer. Five steps flanked by railings lead up to the doorway in the left bay that has a moulded surround. To the right of the door is a cellar opening with a segmental head.	II
Braddylls Arms Public House; 54.19609°N 3.09655°W		Late 18th century (possible)	The public house is rendered and has a concrete tile roof, three storeys, two bays, and a rear wing. The right bay in the ground floor contains an elliptical arch, and the entrance is through a door in this passage. The windows are sashes, and at the rear is a tall window.	II
Ellers House; 54.19510°N 3.09292°W	—	Late 18th century (probable)	A house, later used as offices, it is roughcast with ashlar dressings and a slate roof. There are two storeys and five bays, and the windows are sashes with segmental heads and projecting sills. The doorway has engaged Tuscan columns and a pediment, and to the right is a passageway with a segmental head.	II
Garden walls to north of 21 Fountain Street; 54.19696°N 3.09383°W	—	Late 18th century (probable)	The walls are partly in stone and partly in brick, with flat stone copings, and are about 2 metres (6 ft 7 in) high.	II
Hope and Anchor Public House; 54.19605°N 3.09681°W		Late 18th century (probable)	A roughcast public house with a slate roof, three storeys and three bays. The door has a stone surround, and to its right is a cellar opening. In the ground floor is a casement window, and the other windows are sashes.	II
Lonsdale House Hotel; 54.19589°N 3.09729°W	—	Late 18th century	A house, later a hotel, stuccoed with stone dressings, a band between the bottom and middle storeys, and a slate roof. There are three storeys, cellars, and six bays. The outer bays are slightly recessed, and the centre four bays are rusticated in the ground floor. The windows in the top floor are casements, and the others are sashes. The doorway is approached by steps with railings, and has a round head and a fanlight with Gothick tracery. In the right bay is a round-headed yard entry, and at the rear is a Venetian stair window.	II
Sun Hotel; 54.19581°N 3.09573°W		Late 18th century (probable)	The public house is rendered with a slate roof, two storeys and five bays. The windows are sashes, and in the right bay is a recessed canted bay window. The doorway, in the second bay, has engaged Tuscan columns and a pediment.	II
Ulverston Heritage Centre (warehouse); 54.19613°N 3.09565°W	—	Late 18th century (probable)	The warehouse is in roughcast stone with a slate roof. it has three storeys and bays flanking a loading slot. The windows are casements, and have sandstone sills. The loading slot has a slate-hung dormer with a hoist, and below is a timber doorway in each floor.	II
Warehouse behind 1 Buxton Place; 54.19636°N 3.09465°W	—	Late 18th century (probable)	The warehouse is in stone with limestone dressings and a corrugated asbestos roof. There are three storeys and an attic, and the north front has a central loading slot flanked by one bay on each side. The windows are casements. The loading slot has a slate-hung dormer, and below is a timber doorway with a platform in each floor. In the ground floor to the right is a cart entrance with an elliptical arch and a keystone.	II
Former Congregational Church, steps and gates 54.19935°N 3.09575°W	—	1777	The front range was added to the church in 1847, and it has since been converted into a house. The building is rendered and the roof is slated. The front range is in Tudor style, with two storeys, four bays, and a projecting gabled second bay with a coped gable and a finial. In the bay is a gabled porch that has a sandstone doorway with a Tudor arch above which is a dated plaque and a ball finial. The windows are cross-windows with lattice glazing. The forecourt is enclosed by a wall that has a gateway with stone piers, a wrought iron overthrow with a lantern and iron gates, and steps lead up to the entrance.	II
Canal basin and pier, Ulverston Canal; 54.19039°N 3.05431°W		1793–96	This consists of a pier, a lock, and the perimeter walls of the basin at the east end of the canal. The pier is in limestone and it projects eastward into Ulverston Channel. The walls of the lock are in sandstone with repairs in brick.	II
Lock Cottage; 54.19001°N 3.05442°W	—	1793–96 (probable)	The cottage was built for the lock keeper of the Ulverston Canal. It is roughcast with a slate roof, and has one storey and three bays. The windows are sashes.	II
15–21 Daltongate; 54.19581°N 3.09774°W	—	c. 1800	A row of four houses, roughcast and rendered, with a slate roof. They have three storeys with cellars, No. 21 has one bay and the other houses have two each. The windows vary; most are sashes.	II
32 Queen Street; 54.19467°N 3.09684°W	—	c. 1800	A roughcast house with a slate roof, two storeys and a cellar, and two bays. The windows are sashes, and at the left is a cellar opening. On the front are two flights of steps with cast iron railings parallel with the street leading to the doorway.	II
Former toll house 54.19535°N 3.09932°W	—	c. 1800	The building has two storeys and six sides. The lower storey is in roughcast stone, and the upper floor is in rendered brick. The roof is in slate with six sides, and it has lead-roll flashings. The doorway has a round arch, impost bands, a keystone, and a semicircular fanlight, and the windows are sashes.	II
9 King Street; 54.19652°N 3.09615°W	—	Late 18th or early 19th century	A shop with living accommodation above, rendered, with a slate roof. It has three storeys and three bays. In the ground floor is a shop front with central doorway and a timber fascia. The upper floors contain windows with steel frames.	II
18 Queen Street; 54.19510°N 3.09678°W	—	Late 18th or early 19th century	A shop with living accommodation above, rendered, with stone dressings and a slate roof. It has two storeys and three bays. In the ground floor is a shop front with a timber fascia and scrolled brackets, and to the left is a yard entrance with a segmental arch, a keystone, and impost blocks. The windows in the upper floor are sashes.	II
Sale Room; 54.19678°N 3.09277°W		1821	Originally a Roman Catholic church, the tower was added in 1832. It was later used as an Oddfellows' Hall, and then as a sale room. The building is in stone with a slate roof, and a tower at the north end, and is in Gothick style. It is built against a wall and has windows on only one side; these contain Y-tracery. The tower has three stages, an embattled parapet and iron pinnacles.	II
Conishead Priory; 54.17329°N 3.06751°W		1821–36	A country house on the site of an Augustinian priory, which was extended in 1853, and later became a Buddhist monastery. The house was designed by Philip Wyatt, and completed by George Webster. It is built in rendered brick, limestone and sandstone with slate roofs. It is in Gothic style, and its features include pointed arches, traceried windows, parapets with pierced battlements parapets, steep gables, and panelled octagonal chimneys. In the centre of the front is a three-storey porch that has a turret with spires.	II*
Springfield Mansions; 54.18926°N 3.09667°W	—	c.1825	A large house, later divided into flats, it is pebbledashed, on a plinth, with limestone dressings, a sill band, chamfered quoins, and hipped slate roofs. The entrance front has two storeys, four bays, and sash windows. In the centre is a two-storey semicircular porch, with two baseless Tuscan columns and two half-columns carrying an entablature. The upper floor contains curved windows with pilasters between them.	II
9, 11, 13 and 14 Back Lane; 54.19717°N 3.09229°W	—	Early 19th century	Nos. 9, 11 and 13 are a row of three pebbledashed houses with a slate roof. They have two storeys with attics, and one bay each. No. 14 forms a rear wing, and has five bays, an embattled parapet, and sash windows.	II
24 and 26 Cavendish Street; 54.19439°N 3.09542°W	—	Early 19th century (probable)	A pair of shops with living accommodation above, they are rendered with a slate roof. They have three storeys, each shop has two bays, and the windows are sashes. In the ground floor are timber shop fronts with pilasters and dentilled cornices. To the right is a yard entrance with an elliptical arch, rusticated voussoirs, impost blocks, and a keystone.	II
39, 41 and 43 Daltongate; 54.19563°N 3.09860°W	—	Early 19th century	A row of three pebbledashed houses with stone dressings and a slate roof. There are two storeys, No. 39 has a cellar, and each house has one bay. The doorways are to the right, and the windows are sashes.	II
11 King Street; 54.19657°N 3.09610°W	—	Early 19th century (probable)	A shop with living accommodation above, it is rendered with a moulded cornice, and a slate roof. There are three storeys and two bays. In the ground floor is a shop front with timber pilasters, a fascia, and a cornice. The upper floors contain sash windows.	II
21 King Street; 54.19671°N 3.09603°W	—	Early 19th century (probable)	A shop with living accommodation above, it is rendered with a moulded cornice gutter, a slate roof, and has three storeys and one bay. In the ground floor is a timber shop front with a cornice, and in the upper floors are sash windows.	II
6 and 7 Market Place; 54.19576°N 3.09628°W	—	Early 19th century (possible)	Two shops with living accommodation above, they are roughcast with a slate roof. They have three storeys, and each shop has one bay. In the ground floor are timber shop fronts with recessed doorways, and in the upper floors are sash windows.	II
2 Market Street; 54.19578°N 3.09612°W	—	Early 19th century (probable)	A shop with living accommodation above, it is rendered with a slate roof, and has three storeys and one bay. In the ground floor is a shop front with a yard entry to the right. In the middle floor is a wide casement window, there is a sash window in the top floor, and at the rear are a sash window and a stair window.	II
26 and 30 Market Street; 54.19591°N 3.09479°W	—	Early 19th century (probable)	Shops with living accommodation above, they are rendered with a slate roof, and have three storeys and three bays. In the ground floor are shop fronts and in the upper floors are sash windows.	II
56 Market Street; 54.19574°N 3.09377°W	—	Early 19th century (probable)	A shop with living accommodation above, it is rendered with a slate roof, and has three storeys and one bay. In the ground floor is a shop front with timber pilasters, a fascia and a cornice. In the upper floors are casement windows resembling sashes, the window in the middle floor having a segmental head.	II
58 Market Street; 54.19571°N 3.09371°W	—	Early 19th century (probable)	A shop with living accommodation above, it is rendered with a slate roof, and has three storeys and one bay. In the ground floor is a shop front with a 20th-century door and fascia. In the upper floors are casement windows, the window in the middle floor having a segmental head.	II
60 and 62 Market Street; 54.19568°N 3.09363°W	—	Early 19th century	Two shops with living accommodation above, they are rendered with a slate roof, and have three storeys with attics, and two bays each. In the ground floor are shop fronts with timber pilasters and fascias. In the upper floors are sash windows, and each shop has a flat-roofed attic dormer.	II
64 and 66 Market Street; 54.19566°N 3.09359°W		Early 19th century (probable)	Two shops with living accommodation above, they are rendered with a slate roof, and have three storeys. No. 64 on the right has two bays, and No. 66 has one. In the ground floor are shop fronts, and No. 66 has a timber cornice. In the upper floors is one sash window, the others being casements.	II
68 Market Street; 54.19562°N 3.09351°W	—	Early 19th century (probable)	A shop with living accommodation above, it is rendered with a slate roof, and has three storeys and one bay. In the ground floor is a shop front and a doorway with a segmental head to the right. In the upper floors are casement windows, the window in the middle floor having a segmental head.	II
13 Queen Street; 54.19538°N 3.09650°W	—	Early 19th century	A shop and offices, stuccoed with a slate roof, three storeys and three bays, the right two bays projecting forward under a hipped roof. In the ground floor of these bays is a shop front, and in the ground floor of the left bay is a doorway and a small shop window. In the upper floors are sash windows.	II
16 and 16A Queen Street; 54.19521°N 3.09678°W	—	Early 19th century (probable)	A house, later divided into two flats, stuccoed with stone dressings, chamfered quoins, a sill band, a moulded gutter cornice and a slate roof. There are two storeys with a cellar, and a symmetrical front of three bays. The central doorway is approached by seven sandstone steps with railings, and has unfluted engaged Ionic columns, a pulvinated frieze and a pediment. The windows are sashes with hood moulds, and there are two cellar openings.	II
20 and 22 Queen Street; 54.19504°N 3.09678°W	—	Early 19th century	Two rendered houses with stone dressings, a sill band, a moulded cornice gutter, and a slate roof. They have three storeys, No. 20, on the right has two bays, and No. 22 has one. In the ground floor of No. 20 is a doorway with panelled pilasters and a cornice, to the right is wide window with a segmental head, and to the left is a cart entrance. No. 22 has a canted bay window, and a doorway to the right with a fluted architrave.	II
28 Queen Street; 54.19482°N 3.09682°W	—	Early 19th century	A roughcast shop with living accommodation above and a slate roof. There are three storeys and two bays. In the ground floor is a shop front with a timber cornice and a central doorway. The windows are sashes, those in the middle floor with segmental heads.	II
2 Union Street; 54.19581°N 3.09341°W	—	Early 19th century	A roughcast house with a slate roof, it has three storeys and a symmetrical front of two bays. The central doorway has Doric pilasters, and the windows are sashes.	II
26 and 26A Soutergate; 54.19771°N 3.09571°W	—	Early 19th century (probable)	Two houses on a limestone plinth, stuccoed on the ground floor and pebbledashed above, with ashlar dressings, and bands. The windows are sashes. No. 26 has three storeys and a symmetrical front of three bays. The central doorway is approached by steps and has engaged Ionic columns, an open pediment, and a segmental fanlight. No. 26A, to the left, is recessed and has two storeys and one bay. The doorway is on the right, it is round-headed, and has a fanlight.	II
2–72 Sunderland Terrace; 54.19726°N 3.08700°W	—	Early 19th century	A terrace of 36 houses forming a long convex curve. They are in stone, roughcast at the front, with stone dressings and roofs mainly in slate. Each house has three storeys and one bay, with the doorway on the left. At the rear are long staircase windows, and windows with segmental heads.	II
Pound; 54.19974°N 3.09722°W	—	Early 19th century (probable)	The animal pound is roughly semicircular in plan and has stone walls about 1.5 metres (4 ft 11 in) to 2 metres (6 ft 7 in) high with mainly triangular copings. The wall steps up at the eastern end, and above the entrance on the southwest side is a stone lintel.	II
Sefton House; 54.19457°N 3.09691°W	—	Early 19th century	Originally a house, later used for other purposes, it is roughcast with stone dressings, a sill band, and a slate roof. There are three storeys and three bays, and most of the windows are sashes. The doorway in the right bay is approached by a flight of steps, and it has a doorcase with engaged Tuscan columns and a pediment.	II
The White House; 54.19524°N 3.09306°W	—	Early 19th century (possible)	The house contains some earlier material. It is roughcast with a slate roof. The windows are casements, spaced irregularly, with three on the ground floor and two above. The doorway has a plain surround.	II
Tower on Hermitage Hill; 54.17589°N 3.07202°W		Early 19th century	The tower was built as a summerhouse and has an octagonal plan. It has two storeys and a higher turret on the south side. In the lower storey are three openings with pointed heads, and in the upper storey are four windows with segmental heads.	II
Virginia House Hotel; 54.19492°N 3.09684°W	—	Early 19th century	Originally a house, later a hotel, it is stuccoed with stone dressings and a slate roof. There are three storeys, attics, cellars, and four bays. The windows are sashes with segmental-arched heads, and there are three cellar openings. Five sandstone steps lead up to the doorway, which has a reeded architrave with corner roundels, a fanlight, and a cornice on scrolled brackets.	II
White House Cottage; 54.19519°N 3.09302°W	—	Early 19th century (probable)	The house contains some 17th-century material. It is rendered with a slate roof, two storeys and two bays. The windows are 20th-century casements, and the doorway has a plain surround.	II
Holy Trinity Church; 54.19375°N 3.09786°W	—	1829–32	This was a Commissioners' church designed by Anthony Salvin, the chancel was added in 1880 by Paley and Austin, it is now redundant and has been converted for other uses. It is in limestone with sandstone dressings and has a slate roof. The church consists of a nave with a clerestory, north and south aisles, a lower chancel, and a northwest steeple. The steeple has a tower with angle buttresses and corner pinnacles, and the spire is ribbed. The windows are lancets.	II
Fair View; 54.19434°N 3.10082°W	—	c. 1830	A house built in limestone blocks with a cornice, a blocking course, a slate roof and two storeys with attics. It has a three-bay pedimented central block, flanked by one bay on each side, and a further recessed bay on the right. The porch has two Tuscan columns, a cornice and a blocking course, and to the left is a niche with a statue. The windows are sashes, there are two attic dormers, a bay window on the left return, and a two-storey bow window at the rear.	II
25 and 27 Fountain Street; 54.19672°N 3.09312°W	—	1832	A pair of pebbledashed houses with limestone dressings, a sill band, and a slate roof. There are three storeys and three bays. In the centre is a shared doorcase with three Tuscan columns, a cornice and a blocking course. The ground floor windows are casements with arched heads. In the upper floor is one casement window, the other windows being sashes.	II
29 and 31 Fountain Street; 54.19669°N 3.09295°W	—	1832	A pair of pebbledashed houses with stone dressings, a sill band, and a slate roof. There are three storeys and three bays. In the front is a shared doorcase with three Tuscan columns, and above the doors are fanlights. The windows are sashes, those in the ground floor having arched heads.	II
Dykelands; 54.18995°N 3.10968°W	—	1834	A roughcast house with limestone dressings and a slate roof, it is in cottage orné style with Gothick details, and has two storeys and four bays. The windows are casements that have lights with pointed heads, and in the ground floor they also have transoms. On the front is an open gabled timber porch, two square bay windows, one has a hipped roof and a pierced timber valance with pendants, and the other has a cornice with brattishing. The eaves are overhanging on timber brackets with pendant bosses, and the gables have pierced and carved bargeboards.	II
Ford House; 54.19954°N 3.08549°W	—	1835	A limestone house on a plinth, with a sill band, an eaves band, and a hipped slate roof. There are two storeys, the main block has a symmetrical front of three bays, and to the left is a lower two-storey wing. On the front is a porch with a cornice and a blocking course, and the windows are sashes.	II
1 Buxton Place; 54.19636°N 3.09454°W	—	Early to mid 19th century	A roughcast house with a slate roof, three storeys and a symmetrical front of two bays. Two steps lead up to a central round-headed doorway with impost blocks. The windows are sashes, and in the left return is a round-headed stair window with Gothick tracery.	II
20 and 22 Cavendish Street; 54.19440°N 3.09561°W	—	Early to mid 19th century	A pair of houses, later used for other purposes, they are rendered, No. 22 is rusticated, and they have slate roofs. There are three storeys and each house has two bays. All the windows are sashes. In the right bay of No. 20 is a yard entrance with a segmental head. The right bay of No. 22 has a door with an architrave and there is a partly blocked cellar opening.	II
28 and 30 Cavendish Street; 54.19442°N 3.09532°W	—	Early to mid 19th century	A pair of shops with living accommodation above, they are rendered and have a slate roof. There are three storeys and each shop has two bays. In the ground floor of No. 28 is a casement window, and in the ground floor of No. 30 is a plate glass window; the windows in the upper floors are sashes. The doorways are paired in the centre, and have reeded surrounds, corner paterae, and segmental cornices.	II
13 Fountain Street; 54.19689°N 3.09430°W	—	Early to mid 19th century	A roughcast house on a limestone plinth, with ashlar dressings, a sill band, and a slate roof. There are three storeys and five bays. The left bay projects forward, it is gabled, and contains a carriage entrance with an elliptical head, moulded imposts, and a keystone. There is also a gable over the right two bays. The doorway is approached by three steps, and has a doorcase with engaged Tuscan columns and a pediment.	II
15, 17, 19 and 19A Fountain Street; 54.19684°N 3.09406°W	—	Early and mid 19th century	A row of four houses and shops with living accommodation above, that are roughcast with stone dressings, artificial slate roofs, and two storeys. The windows are sashes, and the doorways have plain surrounds. There are two shop windows, each with a timber entablature and scrolled brackets.	II
1, 2 and 3 Gill Banks; 54.19762°N 3.09878°W	—	Early and mid 19th century	A row of three pebbledashed houses with a slate roof. They have three storeys, and each house has one bay. The doors and windows have stone surrounds, and the windows are a mix of casements and sashes.	II
13 and 15 King Street; 54.19659°N 3.09608°W	—	Early to mid 19th century	A shop with living accommodation above, it is rendered, with a moulded gutter cornice, and a slate roof. There are three storeys and three bays. In the ground floor is a shop front with a central doorway and another doorway to the right, and it incorporates three engaged Greek Doric columns from an earlier shop front. In the upper floor are sash windows.	II
27 and 29 King Street; 54.19685°N 3.09596°W	—	Early to mid 19th century	A pair of shops with living accommodation above, they are rendered with a slate roof. They have three storeys, and each shop has two bays. In the ground floor are 20th-century shop fronts, and the upper floors contain sash windows.	II
31 King Street; 54.19689°N 3.09595°W	—	Early to mid 19th century (probable)	A shop with living accommodation above, it is rendered with a slate roof, three storeys and one bay. In the ground floor is a 20th-century shop front. The middle floor contains a top-hung casement window, and in the top floor is a sash window.	II
8 Market Place; 54.19578°N 3.09618°W	—	Early to mid 19th century (probable)	A shop with living accommodation above, it is rendered with quoins, a timber cornice gutter, and a slate roof. There are three storeys and two bays. In the ground floor is a shop front, and above are sash windows, those in the middle floor having architraves with moulding giving the appearance of triangular pediments.	II
5 Market Street; 54.19598°N 3.09573°W	—	Early to mid 19th century	A shop with living accommodation above, it is rendered with a band between the upper storeys, a slate roof, three storeys and one bay. In the ground floor the shop front has a bow window and a timber fascia, with a doorway to the right.	II
16 and 18 Market Street; 54.19585°N 3.09511°W	—	Early to mid 19th century	A pair of shops with living accommodation above, they are roughcast with stone dressings, a plain eaves band, a timber modillion gutter cornice, and a slate roof. There are three storeys and each shop has two bays. In the upper floors are sash windows. The shop fronts in the ground floor have been altered; the front of No. 16 is rusticated. To the left of the front of No. 18 are two limestone pillars with bases and caps flanking a passageway entry.	II
46 and 48 Market Street; 54.19582°N 3.09405°W	—	Early to mid 19th century	A pair of shops with living accommodation above, they are rendered with a slate roof and three storeys. Each shop has one bay, and the windows in the upper floors are sashes. In the ground floor are shop fronts with the doorways in the centre and the windows on limestone walls. Above the shop fronts is a continuous fascia and cornice.	II
50 Market Street; 54.19579°N 3.09398°W	—	Early to mid 19th century	A shop with living accommodation above, it is rendered with a slate roof, three storeys and a symmetrical front of two bays. In the ground floor is a shop front with a timber fascia and a cornice on two limestone piers. Flanking the central doorway are bow windows and in the upper floors are sash windows.	II
52 Market Street; 54.19578°N 3.09391°W	—	Early to mid 19th century	A shop with living accommodation above, it is rendered with a slate roof, three storeys and one bay. In the ground floor is a shop front with a timber fascia and a cornice, and in the upper floors are sash windows.	II
54 Market Street; 54.19576°N 3.09384°W	—	Early to mid 19th century	A shop with living accommodation above, it is rendered with a slate roof, three storeys and one bay. In the ground floor is a shop front that has panelled pilaster strips, a timber fascia and a cornice, and above are sash windows.	II
18 Prince's Street; 54.19299°N 3.09696°W	—	Early to mid 19th century	A stuccoed house on a limestone ashlar plinth with a sill band and a slate roof. There are two storeys with attics, and a symmetrical front of three bays. The windows are sashes with hood moulds, and in the attic are three gabled dormers containing casements, and flanked by scrolled brackets. The central doorway has engaged Tuscan columns and an open pediment.	II
20 Prince's Street; 54.19285°N 3.09695°W	—	Early to mid 19th century	Originally one house, and later two dwellings, both parts have two storeys and slate roofs. The main house, to the right, is in limestone on a plinth, and has a belt course, a cornice gutter, and a symmetrical front of three bays. Three steps lead up to the central doorway that has engaged Tuscan columns and a projecting cornice, and the windows are sashes. The wing to the left is lower and roughcast, and has two bays. At the left is a carriage entrance with an elliptical arch, now blocked, and to the right is a canted bay window. The left gable wall is slate-hung.	II
17 and 19 Queen Street; 54.19523°N 3.09654°W	—	Early to mid 19th century	Two shops with living accommodation above, on a corner site, roughcast with a slate roof that is hipped on the right. They have three storeys and one bay each. In the ground floor are shop fronts, and most of the windows in the upper floors are sashes.	II
26 Queen Street; 54.19485°N 3.09685°W	—	Early to mid 19th century	A pebbledashed house with a slate roof, three storeys and one bay. The windows are casements imitating sashes. The doorway has a reeded doorcase with corner bosses, a blind fanlight, and a cornice on consoles.	II
30 Queen Street; 54.19475°N 3.09682°W	—	Early to mid 19th century	A shop with living accommodation above, it is roughcast with stone dressings, chamfered quoins, and a slate roof. There are three storeys and three bays. In the ground floor is a shop front on a plinth with cellar openings, that has pilaster strips with channelled rustication and a timber cornice. The windows in the middle floor have architraves, and in the top floor they have projecting sills on brackets.	II
36 and 37 The Gill; 54.19774°N 3.09800°W	—	Early to mid 19th century	A pair of pebbledashed houses with a slate roof. They have three storeys, cellars, and each house has one bay. In the centre is a paired doorway with two fluted engaged Doric columns, a plain frieze, and a timber cornice. The windows of No. 36 are sashes, and in No.37 they are casements; the windows in the lower two floors have segmental heads. In front of the houses is a pebble forecourt.	II
38 The Gill; 54.19777°N 3.09786°W	—	Early to mid 19th century	A house built in limestone rubble with ashlar dressings, a sill band, and a slate roof. It has two storeys, cellars, and a symmetrical front of three bays. The central doorway has fluted engaged Doric columns on square bases, a plain entablature with a fillet, a cornice and a blocking course. The windows are sashes, and under the ground floor windows are cellar openings.	II
39 The Gill; 54.19785°N 3.09760°W	—	Early to mid 19th century	A pebbledashed house on a plinth, with stone dressings, a sill band, a moulded cornice gutter, and a slate roof. It has two storeys and a symmetrical two-bay front, and the windows are sashes. The central doorway has a round head, moulded imposts, and a fanlight.	II
Bellevue and Mayfield; 54.19361°N 3.09712°W	—	Early to mid 19th century	A pair of houses, later used as offices, roughcast on a plinth, with ashlar dressings, a hipped slate roof, two storeys and attics. Bellevue has a symmetrical front of five bays, corner pilaster bands, a sill band, an eaves band, and a stone cornice gutter. The central porch has Ionic columns, pilasters, a cornice, and a blocking course. In the roof are two round-headed dormers. The windows in both houses are sashes. Mayfield, to the left, has one bay.	II
Hill Top; 54.19229°N 3.10154°W	—	Early to mid 19th century	The house was later extended. It is roughcast with a concrete tile roof, and has two storeys. The original part has a symmetrical three-bay front, and the extension to the left has two narrow bays. The windows in the ground floor are sashes, and in the upper floor are casements. On the front is a porch with Tuscan columns, pilasters, a cornice, and a blocking course.	II
Stockbridge House; 54.19633°N 3.09901°W	—	Early to mid 19th century	A pebbledashed house on a plinth with stone dressings, a sill band, a cornice, and a slate roof. There are two storeys with an attic, and a symmetrical front of three bays. The windows have three lights, in the attic they are casements, elsewhere they are sashes, and in the ground floor they have segmental heads. In the centre is a Tuscan porch, and above the doors is a fanlight.	II
Trinity House; 54.19402°N 3.09698°W	—	Early to mid 19th century	The house is in limestone with a sill band and a slate roof. There are two storeys and four bays, and the windows are sashes. The doorway has engaged Tuscan columns and a triangular pediment, and above the door is a fanlight.	II
Lloyds Bank; 54.19586°N 3.09371°W		1836–38	This was built as a Trustee Savings Bank, designed by George Webster in Italianate style, and the clock tower was added in 1844. The bank is in limestone, on a plinth, rusticated in the ground floor and ashlar above, and has a slate roof and two storeys. There is one bay on Market Street and three on Union Street. On each front is a band between the floors, a modillioned cornice, and the central part projects under a pediment. The doorway, on Union Street, has unfluted Doric columns, an inscribed frieze, and a cornice, above which is a decorated cast iron balcony. On the roof is a two-stage tower with open arches in the lower stage, and above is a dome with clock faces, a finial and a weathervane.	II
Church Walk House, wall and railings 54.19704°N 3.09520°W	—	1838 (probable)	A pebbledashed house with ashlar dressings, chamfered quoins, a moulded cornice gutter, and a slate roof. There are two storeys, an attic, a basement, and a symmetrical front of three bays. The central doorway is approached by steps, and has Tuscan pilasters, a semicircular fanlight, and an open pediment. The central bay is gabled and contains a lunette. The other windows are sashes with architraves, and in the right return is a Venetian window. The forecourt is enclosed by a low stone wall and railings with fleur-de-lis finials.	II
Oxfam; 1 King Street; 54.19604°N 3.09635°W		c. 1840	A shop on a corner site with living accommodation above, it is in rusticated limestone in the ground floor, roughcast above, and has a slate roof. There are three storeys with attics, and the main part has three bays on both fronts, and is rounded on the corner. There is a shop front in the ground floor on each front with a central doorway, pilasters and a fascia. In the upper floors are sash windows. At the top on each front is a gable treated as a pediment containing an oculus, and beneath it is a decorated frieze. On the King Street front is a further bay with an attic dormer.	II
Sir John Barrow Monument; 54.20252°N 3.08284°W		1850	The monument stands on the top of Hoad Hill to the northeast of the town, and commemorates the statesman Sir John Barrow. It is in limestone with a rendered shaft, it is in the form of a lighthouse, and is over 30 metres (98 ft) high. At the top is a cornice on which is a lantern with round-arched openings, surmounted by another cornice and a dome. On the shaft are narrow slit openings. The doorway on the west side has an inscribed lintel, and above it is a crest carved with a shield and crest.	II*
Emmanuel Christian Centre; 54.19702°N 3.09626°W	—	1850	Originally the Victoria Concert Hall, later a Christian centre and shop, it is in stone, partly rendered, and has a slate roof and two storeys. The main part is symmetrical with five bays, and at the top is a decorated frieze. The central bay contains a doorway, the upper floor is flanked by pilasters and contains a pair of round-headed windows, and at the top is a pediment. The other windows have flat heads, and all are sashes, those in the upper floor having aprons. At the ends are projecting wings, at the left with two bays, and at the right with one.	II
8, 10 and 10A Daltongate; 54.19601°N 3.09718°W	—	Mid 19th century (probable}	A row of three pebbledashed houses with a slate roof, they have three storeys, and each house has one bay. The windows of No. 10A are casements, and in the other houses they are sashes. The doorways of Nos. 8 and 10 are paired, and both houses have cellar openings.	II
17 King Street; 54.19660°N 3.09608°W	—	Mid 19th century (possible}	A shop with living accommodation above, it is rendered with a slate roof, three storeys and two bays. In the ground floor is a shop front with a central doorway. In the upper floors are sash windows, those in the middle floor with architraves and cornices.	II
19 King Street; 54.19664°N 3.09607°W	—	Mid 19th century (probable}	A shop with living accommodation above, it is rendered with a slate roof, three storeys and one bay. In the ground floor is a shop front with a timber fascia and cornice, and a pilaster on the right. In the upper floors are sash windows with moulded surrounds.	II
20 King Street; 54.19663°N 3.09579°W	—	Mid 19th century (probable}	Originally a shop, later a restaurant, the building contains earlier material. It is rendered and has a slate roof, three storeys and two bays. In the ground floor is a shop front with a central doorway, panelled pilasters, and a fascia. The middle floor contains a wide bow window, and in the top floor are two sash windows with an inscribed plaque between.	II
25 King Street; 54.19680°N 3.09599°W	—	Mid 19th century (possible}	A shop with living accommodation above, it is rendered with a slate roof, three storeys and one bay. In the ground floor is a late 20th-century shop front, and in the upper floors are sash windows with plain surrounds and protruding sills.	II
1 Market Place; 54.19597°N 3.09667°W	—	Mid 19th century	A shop with living accommodation above incorporating earlier material. It is stuccoed with a slate roof, and the gable end faces Market Place. The shop has two storeys and an attic, and in the ground floor is a shop front with two engaged Doric columns, a cornice and a fascia. In the upper floor are two sash windows, and in the attic is a round-headed sash window.	II
3 Market Place; 54.19588°N 3.09663°W	—	Mid 19th century	A rendered shop with a slate roof, and the gable end facing Market Place. It has two storeys, an attic, and two bays. In the ground floor is a timber shop front with a recessed doorway to the right. The upper floor contains windows that are either casements or fixed.	II
10 Market Place; 54.19606°N 3.09617°W	—	Mid 19th century (possible}	A shop with living accommodation above, on a corner site, containing material from earlier periods. It is rendered with a slate roof, and has two storeys with attics. There are two bays with a gable facing King Street, and one bay facing Market Place. There are shop fronts on both faces, with a doorway on a canted corner between them, and above these is a continuous inscribed entablature. Over the doorway is a curved signboard, and in the upper floors are sash windows. The attic window in the gable has a round head with Gothic glazing.	II
1 and 1A Market Street; 54.19598°N 3.09594°W	—	Mid 19th century (possible}	A pair of rendered shops with a slate roof, two storeys and three bays. In the upper floor are sash windows, and to the left is a small window. In the ground floor are shop fronts flanking a central doorway.	II
3 Market Street; 54.19598°N 3.09581°W	—	Mid 19th century (probable}	A shop with accommodation above, a slate roof, three storeys and one bays. In the ground floor is a 20th-century shop front, and above are sash windows.	II
51 Market Street; 54.19570°N 3.09351°W	—	Mid 19th century	A house and a shop on a corner site, the ground floor stuccoed and the upper floors roughcast, it has a slate roof and three storeys. There are three bays on the Market Street face and one bay on the Union Street face. The windows are sashes. In the middle bay on Market Street is a doorway that has a surround with sunken panels and a cornice on brackets. In the left bay, and on the front facing Union Street, are shop windows each with a timber fascia and a cornice on pilasters. Angled on the corner is a recessed doorway.	II
12 and 14 Prince's Street; 54.19336°N 3.09706°W	—	Mid 19th century	A mirrored pair of semi-detached houses in limestone, on a plinth, with a sill band and a slate roof. They have two storeys with attics, and each house has two bays. In the outer bays are canted bay windows, in the upper floors are sash windows with architraves, and in the roof are gabled dormers. The paired doors are in the centre, and have Doric pilasters.	II
5 Queen Street; 54.19562°N 3.09653°W	—	Mid 19th century	A shop with accommodation above, rendered with a slate roof, it has four storeys and two bays. The ground floor contains a timber shop front with a cornice and a recessed doorway. The windows are casements, those in the middle two floors with segmental heads.	II
9 Queen Street; 54.19553°N 3.09652°W	—	Mid 19th century	A shop with accommodation above, rendered with a slate roof, it has four storeys and one bay. In the ground floor is a shop front with a doorway at the left, and in the upper floors are sash windows, one rising to form a gabled dormer.	II
15 Queen Street; 54.19532°N 3.09653°W	—	Mid 19th century	A shop with accommodation above, rendered, with three storeys and two bays. In the ground floor to the left is a yard entrance with a rusticated surround, and to the right is a round-headed doorway between shop windows. The windows in the upper floors are casements, those in the middle floor having architraves.	II
82 Soutergate; 54.19927°N 3.09587°W	—	Mid 19th century	The house is in roughcast stone with a slate roof, two storeys, and a symmetrical front of three bays. There is a fanlight above the door, and the windows are replacements.	II
Bridge House; 54.19633°N 3.09420°W	—	Mid 19th century	A roughcast house with an artificial slate roof. There are two storeys with attics, and a two-bay front. The windows are sashes, and in the roof above a fascia board are two gabled dormers. The central doorway has a chamfered surround, and above it is a cornice on brackets. In the left return is a stair window.	II
Gothic screen wall, 11 and 13 Daltongate; 54.19549°N 3.09736°W	—	Mid 19th century (probable)	The wall at the rear of the gardens is in limestone and is in Gothic style. It contains chamfered pointed blind openings, a blind doorway over which is a cornice and a blocking course, niches, an embattled parapet, and a corner turret.	II
Hoppers Public House; 54.19718°N 3.09617°W	—	Mid 19th century (probable)	Originally a water-powered corn mill, later converted into a public house. It is stone with a slate roof, and has an east front of three storeys ad three bays, and a south front of two storeys and two bays. The windows in the east front are casements, those in the lower two floors having segmental heads. In the centre of the ground floor is a doorway, and in the top floor is a loading door and a steel crane beam.	II
King's Head Public House; 54.19534°N 3.09672°W		Mid 19th century (possible)	The public house contains some 18th-century material, and is rendered with a slate roof. The main part has two storeys and three bays. In the left bay is a cart entrance, to the right is a doorway with a segmental head approached by two steps, and flanked by two casement windows. In the upper floor are sash windows. To the right is a three-storey bay with a casement window in each floor.	II
Queen's Hotel; 54.19693°N 3.09590°W	—	Mid 19th century	Originally a hotel, later a restaurant, it is on a corner site. The building is stuccoed, on a plinth, with chamfered quoins, a band above the ground floor, and a hipped slate roof. There are three storeys with attics, each front has three bays, and the windows are sashes. The entrance front is symmetrical, and the central doorway has a quoined surround and a cornice on brackets. The flanking ground floor windows have quoined surrounds, and the window above the doorway has an architrave with a cornice on brackets. In the attic are three dormers with casement windows and segmental heads.	II
Former goods station, store and house 54.19218°N 3.09670°W		1855	The original railway station, store and house, built for the Furness Railway, later a goods station, and then converted and used for other purposes. It is in polychrome sandstone, with a chamfered plinth, quoins, bands, and a cornice. The train shed has a corrugated iron roof, and the other roofs are hipped and slated. The train shed has a coped gable and a large segmental arch with rusticated voussoirs and a moulded impost band. This is flanked by round-arched doorways with rusticated voussoirs. The former house, set back to the right, has two storeys, three bays, casement windows imitating sashes, and lintels over the door and windows.	II
Former drill hall and associated structures 54.19332°N 3.09397°W	—	1860s	The buildings consist of an administrative block at the front, a sergeant's house to the south, and a drill hall with a rifle range in the basement to the west. They have since been used for other purposes. The buildings are in limestone with red sandstone dressings and slate roofs. The administrative block has two storeys and three bays, and the house to the left has two storeys and two bays. They are on a plinth, and have a sill band. In the centre of the administrative block is an arched entrance, and the windows are mullioned, those in the ground floor with arched heads. The drill hall has five bays and a roof with a wide span, and there is a tall boundary wall with stone coping.	II
Former National Westminster Bank; 54.19565°N 3.09669°W		c. 1865	Originally built as a bank with attached manager's house, later a bank and offices, it is in limestone with slate roofs. Both parts have three storeys, the former house has four bays, the left bay recessed, and with a pediment above the other three bays, and the bank has three bays. Most of the windows in both parts are sashes. In the centre of the bank is a recessed porch flanked by Tuscan columns and pilasters, and with a modillioned cornice. The windows in the middle floor have pediments, and in the middle floor of the former house they have cornices.	II
9 Market Street; 54.19598°N 3.09571°W	—	Mid to late 19th century (probable)	A shop with living accommodation above, it is rendered with a slate roof, three storeys and one bay. In the ground floor is a shop front with a timber cornice and carved brackets. The middle floor contains a sash window, and in the top floor is a window with a central pivot.	II
Stone Cross Mansion; 54.19580°N 3.10325°W	—	1874	A large house, later used for other purposes, it is in limestone with sandstone dressings and slate roofs. The building is in Scottish baronial style and has an irregular plan around a central rectangular block. There is a central five-stage tower with a bowed oriel window, machicolations, gargoyles, and bracketed-out balconies. In the entrance front is a porch with a gablet, a pierced parapet, and columns with clustered shafts.	II
Rioja; Former HSBC Bank; 54.19561°N 3.09549°W	—	Late 19th century	Built for the Cumberland Union Bank, it is in sandstone ashlar on a limestone plinth and has a slate roof. There are three storeys and an asymmetrical front with one window to the left of the doorway and two to the right. The windows in the ground floor are fixed, and above they are sashes in architraves. The doorway is flanked by pilasters, and above it is a complex carved panel.	II
Ulverston railway station including nightclub 54.19155°N 3.09803°W		1878	The railway was built for the Furness Railway and was designed by Paley and Austin in Italianate style, and part of it has since been used as a nightclub. The station is in sandstone on a limestone plinth. At the northeast corner is a two-storey block with a four-storey clock tower, and to the west is a single-storey wing ending in a gabled cross-wing. A screen wall extends to the east and ends in a two-storey tower, now disused. There are glazed canopies over all the platforms.	II
34 Market Street and 2 Brogden Street; 54.19588°N 3.09455°W		1879	A shop on a corner site with living accommodation above, it is rendered with a band between the upper storeys, rusticated corner pilaster strips, and a slate roof. There are three storeys, three bays on Market Street and two on Brogden Street. The windows are sashes with architraves, and in the gable end facing Brogden Street is a small attic window with a sill on a bracket and a date. In the ground floor is a shop front, the entrance in Brogden Street having pilasters, a dentilled cornice and a pediment. To the left is a two-storey two-bay extension containing warehouse doors, and beyond that is a one-bay shop with a gable.	II
Rolling bridge and accumulator tower 54.19367°N 3.06797°W		1883	The rolling bridge was built by the Furness Railway to carry a railway line over the Ulverston Canal, and was designed so that it could be moved to allow the passage of ships on the canal. It is in iron and steel and is no longer in use. Nearby is an accumulator tower, in brick with sandstone dressings with a slate roof. It has a square plan, two storeys and two doorways.	II
Wilson's Monument; 54.18395°N 3.08708°W	—	c. 1900	The monument is in Ulverston Cemetery, and commemorates Thomas Watkins Wilson. It is in marble, and consists of a replica lighthouse, surrounded by rocks and waves. On the top is a glass lantern with an openwork drum and a ball-and-spike finial. On the base are inscriptions.	II
Barclays Bank; 54.19441°N 3.09494°W		1901–02	Built for the Bank of Liverpool on a corner site, it is in red sandstone on a limestone plinth, with a slate roof. It has an irregular plan, with two storeys, and is in Jacobean style. On the corner is a canted bay window that rises to an octagonal turret with a copper dome. To its right is a doorway with a segmental shell pediment on granite columns. The windows are mullioned and transomed. Other features include shaped gables with ball finials, a band of carved foliage, and another doorway with a shell pediment.	II
War memorial 54.19591°N 3.09634°W		1921	The war memorial, designed by W. G. Collingwood, stands in Market Place. It is in sandstone and consists of a stepped base with thin diagonal buttresses and crocketed gables, a column of clustered shafts with a foliated capital, and a cross head. On the sides of the base are inscribed bronze plaques.	II
