= Staithes Viaduct =

Former railway viaduct in North Yorkshire, England

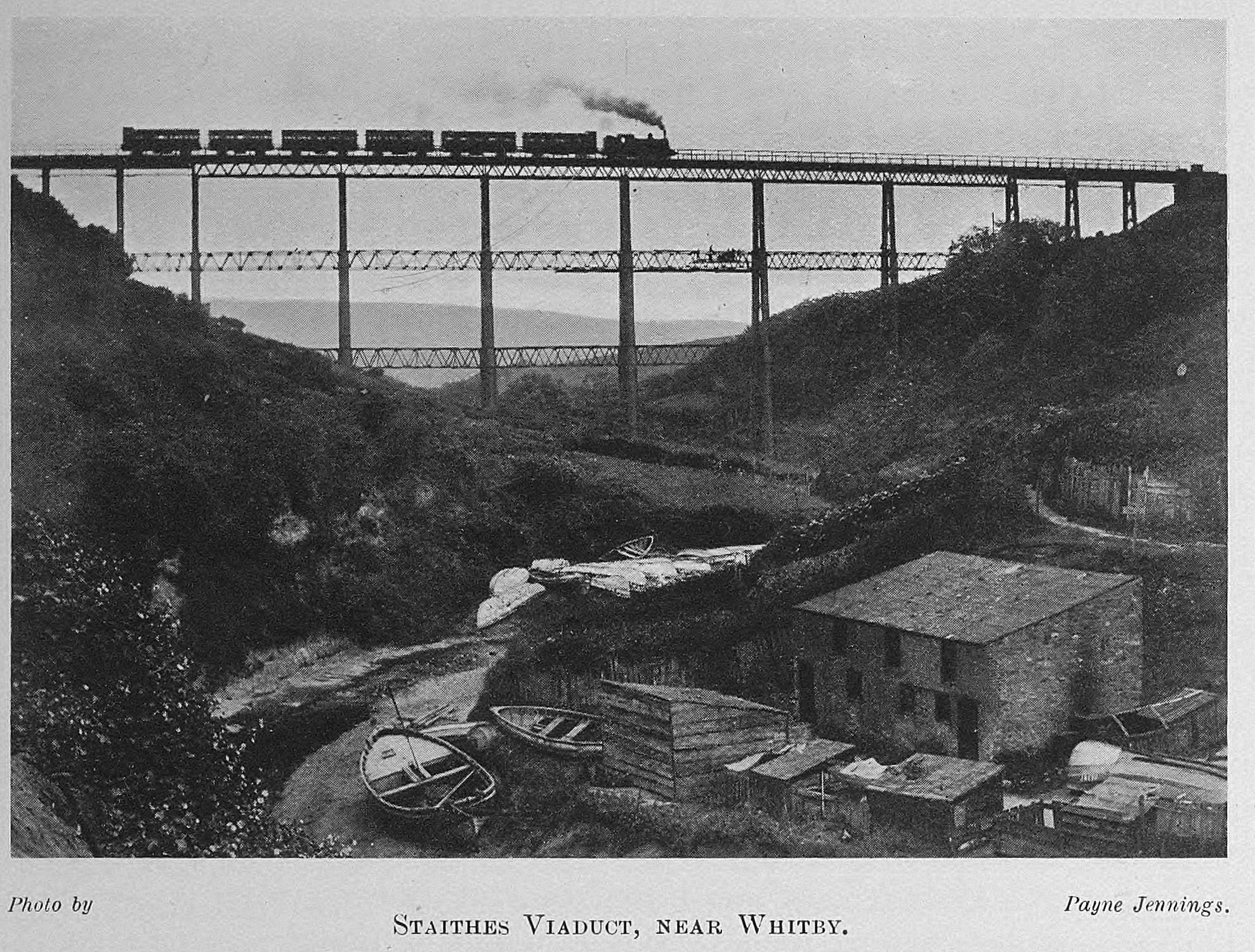
- Staithes Viaduct
- Coordinates: 54.556°N 0.795°W
- OS grid reference: NZ77951856
- Crosses: Staithes Beck (Note: Ordnance Survey mapping shows the water beneath to be named Staithes Beck. It has also been described as Roxby Beck, with the steep ravine known as the valley of Dalehouse Beck.)
- Locale: Staithes, North Yorkshire, England
- Website: www.staithes.org.uk/things-to-do/beck-bridge/
- Preceded by: Kilton Viaduct (northwards)

Characteristics
- Material: Iron and concrete
- Total length: 790 feet (240 m)
- Height: 152 feet (46 m)
- No. of spans: 17
- Piers in water: 1

Rail characteristics
- No. of tracks: 1

History
- Fabrication by: Skerne Works
- Opened: 1875
- Closed: 1958

Location
- Interactive map of Staithes Viaduct

Staithes Viaduct was a railway bridge that straddled Staithes Beck at Staithes, Yorkshire, England. It was north of the closed Staithes railway station. It was known for an anemometer, a fitting to tell the signaller if winds across the viaduct were too strong for crossing trains.

Major crossing structures, including the viaduct, on the Whitby to Loftus line were made out of iron, with the piers additionally filled with concrete. The viaduct started to be built in 1875 and opened in 1883 – due to financial, build and ownership problems. The line closed in 1958 and the viaduct demolished in 1960.

== History ==
The Whitby, Redcar and Middlesbrough Union Railway (WR&MUR) was built in the 1870s, but the construction of the line was beset by financial and geological problems. Staithes Viaduct was originally built in 1875, but traffic did not start until 1883. The viaduct was constructed from tubular iron filled with concrete, with seventeen spans; six spans of 60 feet (18 m) in the middle of the bridge, and a further combined eleven spans at either end of the bridge measuring 30 feet (9.1 m) each. The bridge was 790 feet (240 m) long, and was elevated 152 feet (46 m) above Staithes Beck, with one of the piers sunk into the riverbed. The piers of the viaduct were constructed of tubular steel, filled with concrete. As built, the viaduct did not have the strengthening spars running horizontally through the piers; these were added in eight years after opening, with some stating that it was a reaction to the Tay Bridge disaster.

The coast routes from Whitby were deemed to be awkward to build in terms of geology and necessitating large engineering programmes such as tunnels, embankments and bridges. The WR&MUR line was abandoned by the original contractors due to financial problems, and the NER took over the line, but had to effectively rebuild many of the tunnels and bridges. The viaduct at Staithes was no exception; the tubes of the piers were supposed to have been filled with concrete, and when they were opened, it was found that only gravel had been poured into the tubes. So concrete made from local sandstone mixed with Portland cement was inserted as per the original intention. These extra works further delayed opening of the line by two years, with the line opening in 1883 instead of 1881. The line was assessed at least twice by a government inspector, with various recommendations for improvement of works. One report submitted by Major-General Hutchinson noted defects in at least three of the piers of Staithes Viaduct, and also was the first to mention a wind gauge and possible speed restrictions.

The design was that of John Dixon, and the original contractor was Paddy Waddell. The ironwork for the viaduct was constructed off site at the Skerne Iron Works, in Albert Hill, Darlington. The same company provided all the ironwork for the other four viaducts on the Whitby-Loftus line, however, the viaduct at Staithes was the tallest and longest, being described as "spectacular". The cross-sections of iron were also fabricated by the Skerne Works and were of heavy iron bars. The diameter of the pier tubes on the 30-foot (9.1 m) spans was 2 feet 6 inches (0.76 m), with the same thickness at the top of the 60-foot (18 m) spans, however they tapered to 4 feet 6 inches (1.37 m) at the bottom.

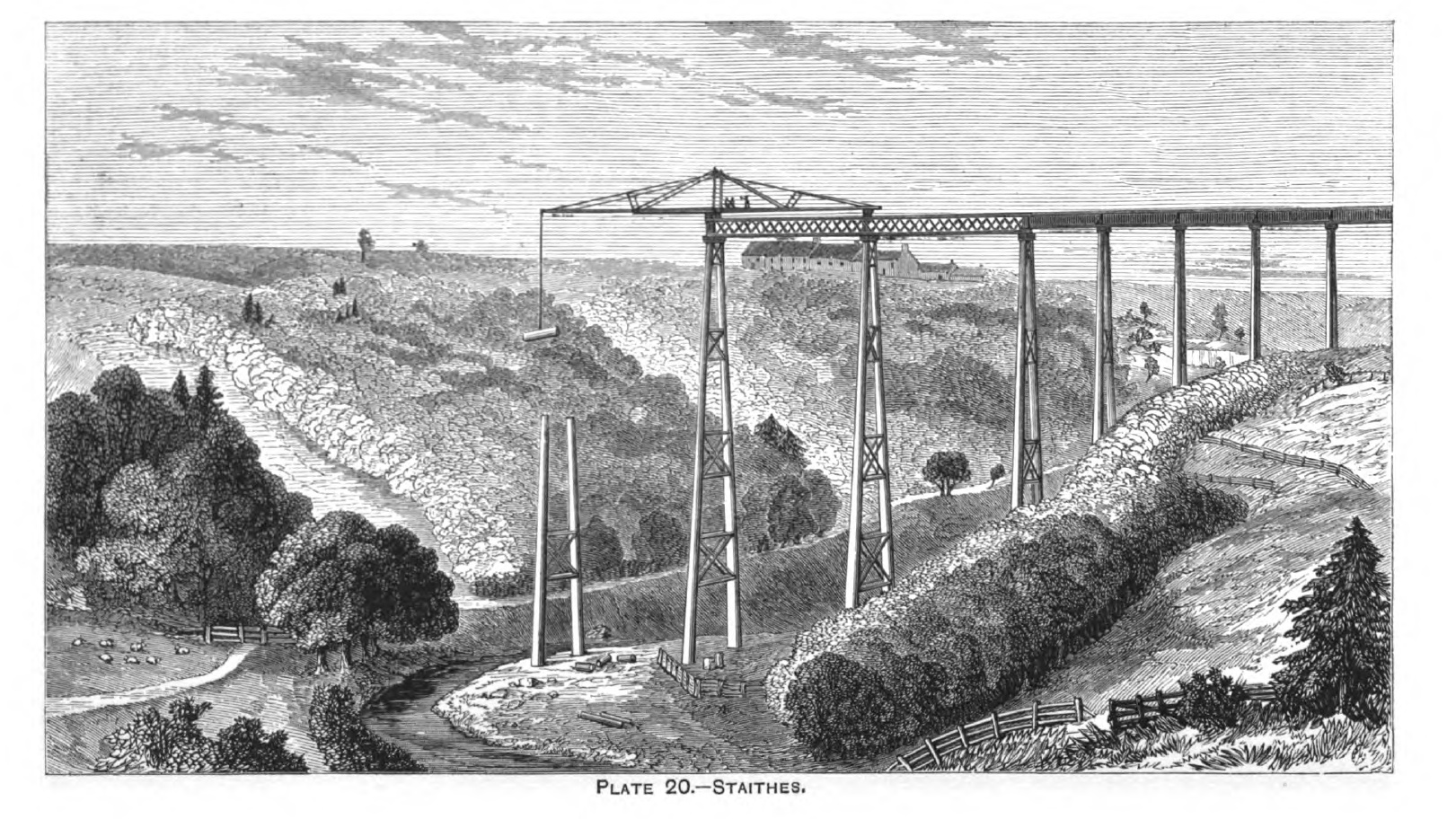
Staithes Viaduct under construction

A diagram from the time shows the viaduct being erected from the south side of the ravine by a steam crane, but the question of how the iron was delivered to the site remains unanswered. As the nearest railhead was at Loftus, some 5 miles (8 km) to the north, an overland route seems unlikely. Williams postulates that the iron sections were delivered by sea to the small harbour at Staithes.

In 1884 the North Eastern Railway installed an anemometer on the viaduct that was designed to ring a bell in Staithes signal box should the force of the wind reach a pressure greater than 28 pounds per square foot (1.3 kPa). This would prompt a track investigation. In March of 1884, the NER issued instructions that the line speed across the viaduct was 20 miles per hour (32 km/h) and that if a storm rang the bell in the signal box, all effort should be made to stop southbound trains travelling over the viaduct if they were on their way. However, northbound trains were allowed to draw up into, and wait at, the station. In 1935, the LNER stated that the system had hardly been used, however, because of concerns about the winds across the viaduct, the equipment was replaced in 1946.

The line was closed in May 1958, and the viaduct was dismantled two years later in 1960. British Rail stated that the cost of maintaining the five iron viaducts and tunnels on the line would cost over £57,000. All that remains of the structure at Staithes is the western abutment made of stone. The eastern abutment, and the associated station area, have disappeared under a housing development. The structure is remembered by a plaque in the village with details of the viaduct.

The last windspeed anenometer used on the viaduct is now in the collection of the National Railway Museum in York.

== See also ==
- Leven Viaduct, which also had an anenometer installed.
