= Kilton Viaduct =

Viaduct in Yorkshire, England

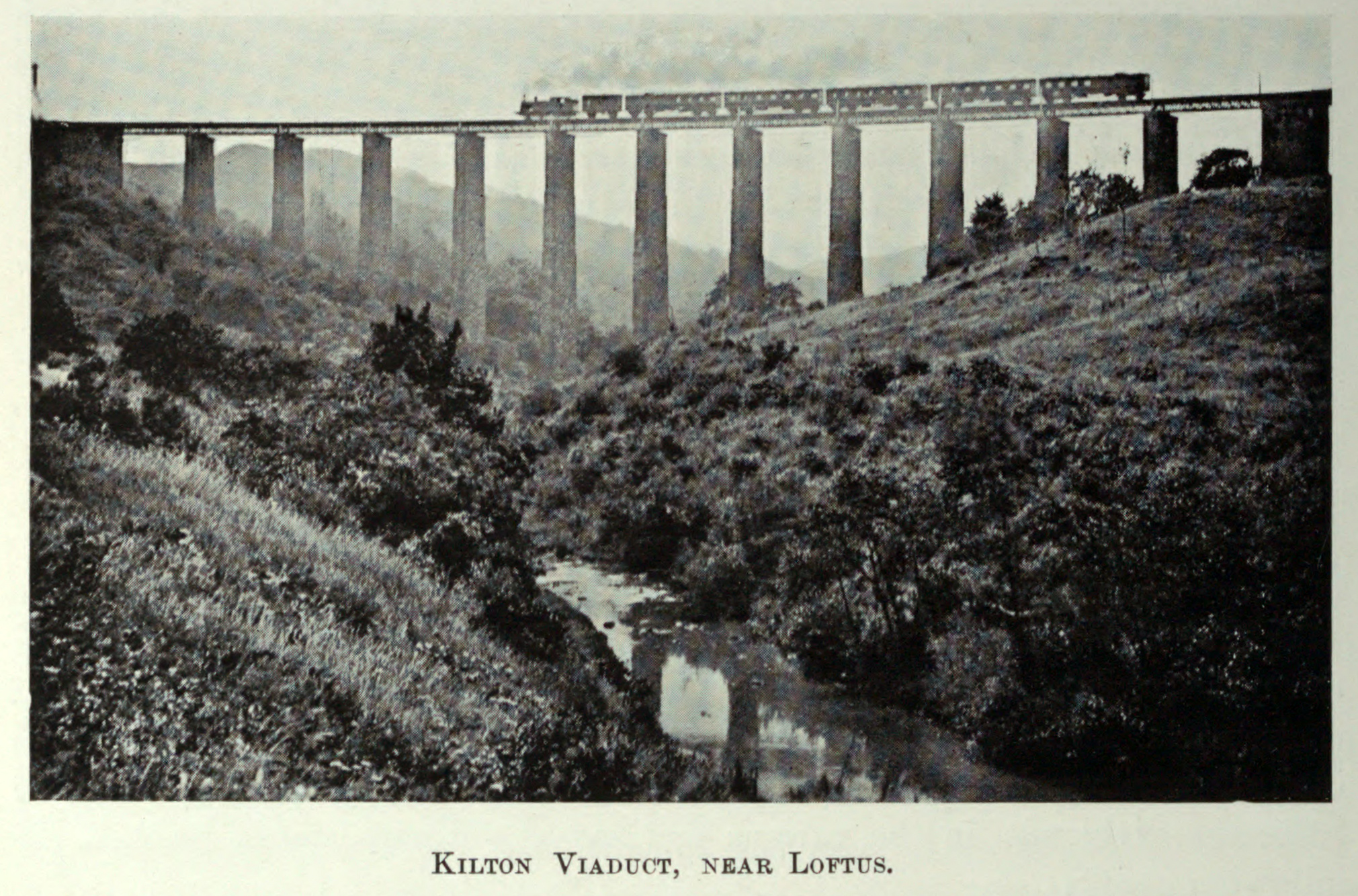
- Kilton Viaduct, near Loftus
- Coordinates: 54.556°N 0.904°W
- OS grid reference: NZ709185
- Carries: Boulby Line
- Crosses: Kilton Beck
- Locale: Loftus, North Yorkshire, England
- Other name: Kilton Beck Viaduct
- Owner: Network Rail
- Preceded by: Upleatham Viaduct
- Followed by: Staithes Viaduct

Characteristics
- Material: Wrought iron (original); Freestone (original); Ironstone shale (embankment)
- Total length: 226 yards (207 m)
- Height: 150 feet (46 m)
- No. of spans: 13

Rail characteristics
- No. of tracks: 1

History
- Architect: James Brunlees
- Opened: 1867
- Replaced by: Embankment

Location
- Interactive map of Kilton Viaduct

Kilton Viaduct was a railway viaduct that straddled Kilton Beck, near to Loftus, in North Yorkshire, England. The viaduct was opened to traffic in 1867, however in 1911, with the viaduct suffering subsidence from the nearby ironstone mining, the whole structure was encased in waste material from the mines creating an embankment which re-opened fully to traffic in 1913. The railway closed in 1963, but then in 1974, it re-opened as part of the freight line to Boulby Mine carrying potash traffic.

== History ==
An Act of Parliament from 1865, authorised the construction of the Saltburn Extension Railway, which would connect the lines through Skinningrove to Loftus, and allow for the ironstone industry in the region to export its product by rail. Between Skinningrove and Loftus railway stations, the line crossed a 300-yard (270 m) ravine through which Kilton Beck flows. The line was opened to traffic in 1867. The viaduct, which was built to a design by Sir James Brunlees, was also sometimes known as Kilton Beck Viaduct.

When completed, the viaduct was 226 yards (207 m) (678 ft) long with twelve piers all 45 feet (14 m) apart and some 150 feet (46 m) above Kilton Beck. The width of the bridge section was 28 feet 6 inches (8.69 m), and eleven of the piers were 30–31 feet (9.1–9.4 m) in width. The thirteenth span, the most northerly, was built on a skew and was 52 feet (16 m) across to accommodate a line from Carlin How Junction, which formed a reverse headshunt underneath that arch of the viaduct. The span was deliberately wider than the other piers as it was built to accommodate three tracks side by side. The lines underneath the viaduct were built to allow access to ironstone mines and works at Skinningrove, which was 260 feet (80 m) below the viaduct. The main pier of the wider (thirteenth) span was a trapezoid shape at the bottom where it was rooted into the ground. Again, this was to enable the accommodation of the line on the curved viaduct. Although the viaduct was constructed with the correct width for two lines, only one line was ever laid or used. The bridge deck was constructed from a metal lattice-girder, and the piers were built of stone. This involved 176 tonnes (194 tons) of wrought iron, and 16,000 cubic yards (12,000 m^{3}) of freestone.

By 1908, subsidence was obvious, and so a speed limit of 8 miles per hour (13 km/h) was enforced on trains passing over the viaduct. However, by 1911, the effects of the subsidence was so bad that action was taken to remedy the problem. The line closed to freight traffic, and a culvert across Kilton Beck was constructed to allow the free flow of water. This culvert is 435 feet (133 m) long, 18 inches (460 mm) thick at the ceiling, 14 feet (4.3 m) deep for the water channel and 13 feet (4 m) at its widest point (normal water level). It was constructed from ferro-concrete and was re-inforced with Kahn steel bars. This was due to the loads involved on the structure, and to combat the possible future effects of subsidence from ironstone mining. Some 720,000 tonnes (790,000 tons) of ironstone waste from the Cargo Fleet Iron Company mine at Liverton, was poured through the lattice girders to create an embankment. However, the operation was halted for two weeks when one of the piers showed signs of stress (probably due to inaccurate pouring of the shale), but eventually, the embankment was opened to all traffic in 1913. Whilst the viaduct was closed completely for two weeks, passengers were conveyed between Skinningrove and Loftus railway stations by a motor char-à-banc. Freight traffic had to travel south to Whitby West Cliff, and run up the Esk Valley Line to Middlesbrough. The zig-zag line was amended so it ran alongside the embankment formation rather than through it, but at a lower level.

The railway south to Loftus across the embankment closed to passengers in 1960, and then completely in August 1963. However, the line between Skinningrove and Boulby re-opened in 1974 for potash traffic. Modern mapping shows the embankment as Kilton Viaduct and lists it as being 8 chains (530 ft; 160 m) long. Paths exist alongside the line across the embankment, with walkers and cyclists saying that the views are "fabulous". Although the line is now closed south of Boulby, the next viaduct south was the now dismantled Staithes Viaduct. Northwards it is Upleatham/Skelton/Saltburn Viaduct.

== See also ==
- Saltburn Viaduct
- Slapewath Viaduct
