= Leven Viaduct =

Railway viaduct in Cumbria, England

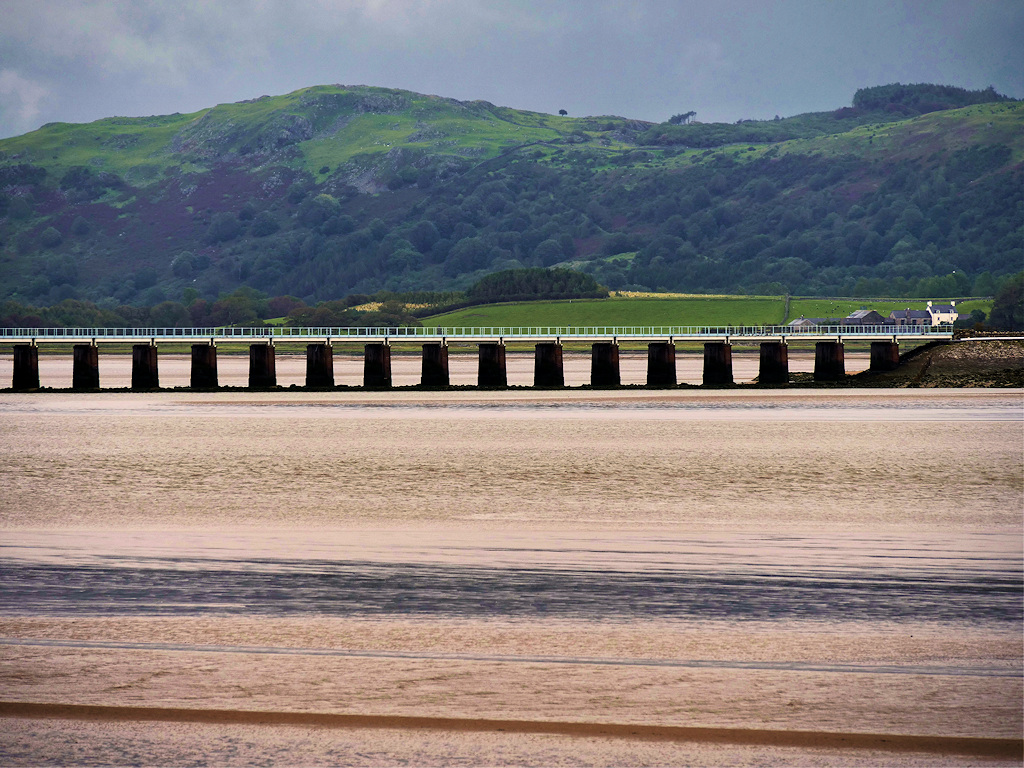
- Leven Viaduct
- Coordinates: 54.1989°N 3.0429°W
- OS grid reference: SD322786
- Carries: Cumbrian Coast Line
- Crosses: River Leven
- ELR no.: CBC1 34

Characteristics
- Total length: 23 chains (1,500 ft; 460 m) (Note: Chains is the measurement used by the railway engineers in the 19th century, and still in use today on Network Rail.)
- Height: 26 feet (7.9 m) (to rails above low water)
- No. of spans: 49

Rail characteristics
- No. of tracks: 2
- Track gauge: 1,435 mm (4 ft 8 1/2 in) standard gauge

History
- Designer: James Brunlees
- Construction start: 1 April 1856
- Construction end: 14 June 1857
- Construction cost: £18,604 (single line)
- Opened: August 1857
- Rebuilt: 1863; 1884; 2006

Location
- Interactive map of Leven Viaduct

Leven Viaduct is a railway bridge which carries the Furness Line over the River Leven in Cumbria, England. The viaduct was opened as a single track structure as part of the Ulverstone and Lancaster Railway in August 1857. It was widened to two tracks in 1863, and rebuilt in the 1880s, 1925 and again in 2006. Originally, the viaduct had a telescopic section at the western end which could retract to let shipping through; this was fixed in place in 1866 after an Act of Parliament allowed the Furness Railway Company to transfer shipping to the Ulverston Canal, and tranship goods further upstream using railway wagons. An accident on the viaduct in 1903 in which a train was blown over, necessitated the installation of an anenometer to measure wind speeds, and if needed, the viaduct would be closed to traffic.

== History ==
As the proposal for the Ulverstone [sic] and Lancaster Railway (Ulverstone and Lancaster Railway Act 1851 (14 & 15 Vict. c. cii)) was going through Parliament, a committee was going over the finer details of the act such as the request that the lifting section of the proposed viaduct be at the western end, so that the channel of the River Leven could be diverted westwards and so pass by Canal Foot, where the Ulverston Canal emptied into the estuary. The first viaduct at the location was built with columns on hinges towards the landward side, so that in the event of the need for two tracks, they could be moved out in a concertina fashion, and thus only one extra pile on each pier would be needed to be sunk to widen the viaduct. Work commenced in April 1856 and finished in June 1857. The total cost was £18,604 for the building of the viaduct and only laying a single-track, with the railway opening two months later in August 1857. The viaduct had a short delay in opening due to a sailing ship, the Sarah-Jane, crashing into some of the piers when she was attempting to go upriver to Greenodd. The design of the viaduct was down to James Brunlees, who used the same practice for submersing some of the piles into the river bed when he was overseeing the construction of the Solway Viaduct. The engineering was contracted out to W. and J. Galloway of Manchester.

The viaduct was widened to two tracks in 1863, reconstructed in wrought iron in the 1880s, and in 1915, the wrought iron piers were encased in concrete and brickwork. Initially, each span had four columns but when the viaduct was rebuilt in 1863 with double track, this was increased to six columns per pier. A rebuilding in 1884 was due to the company introducing heavier locomotives on the route.

The viaduct has 49 spans, each being 30 feet (9.1 m) across, apart from one section which is 36 feet (11 m) across, and carries the track over the main channel which is always in water whatever the state of the tide. The original viaduct had this span as 38 feet (12 m) and consisted of a moveable section to allow shipping through. A diagram in Rennison's book about civil engineering shows a telescopic section that retracted in one direction. It was decided against using a lifting or drawbridge, as strong winds move up the estuary from the Irish Sea, so Brunlees developed a telescopic or horizontal sliding bridge for that section. The tracks are 26 feet (7.9 m) above the low water level in the channel below. At both ends, the railway leaves the viaduct and crosses over embankments built on the sides of the estuary; work on building Capeshead Embankment, on the eastern side of the viaduct, was started in April 1853, three years before work on the viaduct started.

When the engineer came to sink the foundations of the piers, they had gone down to a depth of 70 feet (21 m) for the test borings and had failed to find solid rock, as apart from a rock to the immediate west of the viaduct (Tridley Point), the bed of the estuary is "...a mass of shifting sands..." As such, only the outermost two piers at either end are set into ashlar stonework; the rest of the piers were sunk to a depth of 20 feet (6.1 m) in the sand of the estuary on a special type of disc pile, invented by Brunlees for this type of environment. This involved using high pressure jets to loosen the sand through the use of a pipe, and the disc possesses toothed edges and serrated flanges to aid its path through compacted silt. The combination of agitating the pile first in one direction, then another, allowed it to sink under its own weight, with the water-jet disturbing sand and mud in its path. The exceptions to this were the foundations for the opening bridge section, which were sunk to a depth of 26 feet (7.9 m). Stone for surrounding the piers and to go in the embankments was quarried at Canal Foot, on the western bank of the river just north of where the Ulverston Canal sea lock is. Seven of the piles were damaged in an accident in late September 1858, when a marine vessel was not anchored properly and drifted into the viaduct. Minimal damaged occurred but wagons and carriages were taken across the viaduct one at a time until repairs were made. This type of accident occurred soon after, and again delayed things, but one writer commented that the company only built fenders in the river to protect the viaduct after the viaduct had been completed, despite agreeing with the Admiralty that they were necessary to protect both shipping and the viaduct. In 1860, a breakwater was built at the western end of viaduct to help channel the water through the viaduct and the estuary.

A Furness Railway report from 1866, states that the prospect of a railway between Ulverston and Newby Bridge (what would become the Ulverston and Lakeside Line) would enable the moveable section of the viaduct to be fixed in place as river traffic to the port of Greenodd would be superseded by the new railway. In that same year, when shipping up the estuary had diminished, the moveable bridge was replaced with fixed beams. Permission to permanently close the bridge was given by an Act of Parliament (Furness Railway Act 1866 (29 & 30 Vict. c. clxxvi)), which had authorised the construction of the Bardsea branch from Plumpton, and the railway line to Newby Head. Those who had used the port of Greenodd for shipping were offered the chance to transfer their goods by rail to the Ulverston Canal basin at "favourable rates".

In February 1903, a train crossing the viaduct was derailed by a gust of 100-mile-per-hour (160 km/h) wind in a severe storm resulting in 34 injuries. It had stopped on the viaduct due to a loss of steam pressure, which was caused by telegraph wires disconnecting the brake hose; the train had run over the wires just before the viaduct. The investigating officer later stated that "Had this mail train been on the up line (Note: The Up line was the northernmost on the viaduct taking trains from Ulverston to Carnforth. The mail train was on the Down line, with the winds blowing from the south.) it would almost have certainly fallen over the viaduct into the river bed below with terrible results." It was thought that a woman and her two daughters had been "pitched into the river and drowned." It was later established that they left the carriage at Carnforth, but did not re-board the train before it left, and at the accident scene, their luggage was left unclaimed.

During the inquiry, the locomotive superintendent stated that he arrived on scene at about 9:30 am and saw that the steam engine was still upright, but that the mail van was half blown over and still coupled to the locomotive. All other carriages and wagons were on their sides, and he surmised that the last wagon was the first to go and dragged the other wagons and carriages over with it. In his conclusion, the investigator stated that as the rails were set 15 inches (380 mm) higher than the parapet of the viaduct, it allowed the wind to push upwards against the train. He recommended that new parapets of 4 feet 6 inches (1.37 m) were installed. After the accident, a wind pressure gauge (an anenometer) was installed at the western end of the viaduct, and if the wind levels reached too high a pressure to allow trains to safely cross, then alarm bells would ring in the signal boxes. The wind gauge was removed by Railtrack in March 2000 when Plumpton Junction signal box and all its associated sidings and lines were removed. Railtrack stated that a modern meteorological system would warn of wind speeds of 70 miles per hour (110 km/h) or above.

In the 1915 strengthening works, the 1857 causeway built beneath the viaduct was excavated to a depth of 5 feet (1.5 m), and the piers were then encased in concrete and had bricks and stones placed around them. The piers also had large boulders dropped from trains around the bases, but all of this is not able to be seen today due to the silting of the estuary. These works cost £27,482.

In 2006, the entire 49-span deck was replaced by a brand new steel deck, and the innovative system for laying the new deck and removing the old was received a civil engineering award. This was necessitated by the action of "corrosive sea air and difficult tides" with completion of the project in July 2006 costing £14 million. During the course of the rebuild, workers noticed a young dolphin struggling in low water. They managed to capture it and release it into deeper water. When the finished viaduct was handed back to allow traffic over, the speed over the bridge could be raised from the previous 20 miles per hour (32 km/h) restriction to 60 miles per hour (97 km/h); however, the raised line speed could not take place until 2009, after Network Rail had done sufficient testing on the new structure.

Along with Eskmeals Viaduct (further round the coast) the flow of the water along the River Leven has been altered by the construction of the viaduct; water now flows further westwards through the channel. This was intended by the engineer who built the viaduct, as the Admiralty wanted to keep a channel into the Leven open for ships, so Brunlees diverted the water westwards through the wider span, and thereby changed the course of the river.

The viaduct is also sometimes known as Plumpton Viaduct. (Note: At least two other viaducts in Britain have been called Leven Viaduct; there was a trestle viaduct over the River Leven near Balloch which carried the Forth and Clyde Junction Railway, and a road viaduct carrying the A19 over the River Leven in North Yorkshire is also similarly named.)

== See also ==
- Staithes Viaduct, also had an anenometer installed
