= Salthouse, Barrow-in-Furness =

Area of Barrow-in-Furness, Cumbria, England

Coordinates: 54.11034°N 3.21359°W

Salthouse
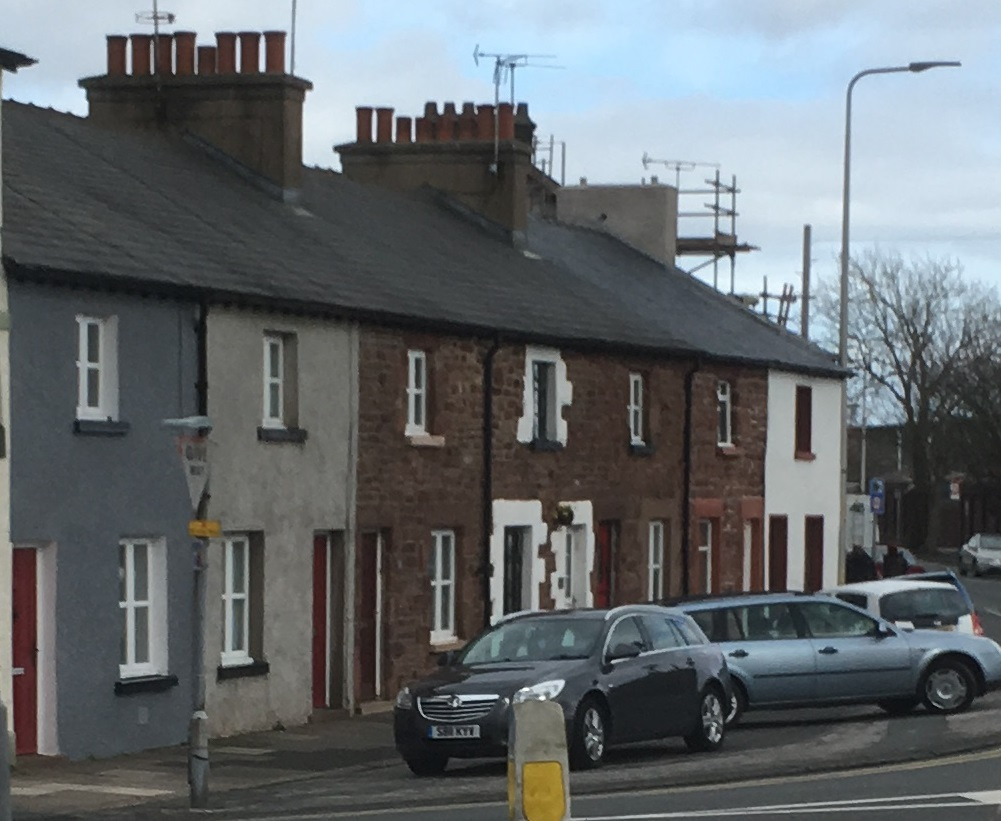
- Houses on Salthouse Road

- Location within Cumbria
- Civil parish: Barrow
- Unitary authority: Westmorland and Furness
- Ceremonial county: Cumbria
- Region: North West
- Country: England
- Sovereign state: United Kingdom
- Police: Cumbria
- Fire: Cumbria
- Ambulance: North West

Salthouse is an area of Barrow-in-Furness, in the Westmorland and Furness district, in the ceremonial county of Cumbria, England. Centred on Salthouse Road to the east of the town centre it was historically a ward in its own right however has since been subsumed into the wards of Risedale and Central Barrow. Salthouse Mills Industrial Estate is located in Salthouse and is home to many long-term industrial tenants including Dixons Forge, Furness Vehicle Dismantlers, Furness Heat Treatment, and Furness Joinery. It was acquired by a London based property developer Hiltongrove in 2018 and has been undergoing the transformation into a modern, outperforming 17-acre industrial site.

== History of Salthouse Mills Industrial Estate ==
Barrow Chemical Wood Pulp Company opened a factory at Salthouse and became Kilner Partington Pulp Company in 1892. It later became Barrow Paper Mills Ltd, producing fine paper for the printing industry. Its import of paper pulp was important traffic for the Associated British Ports. Barrow Paper Mills Ltd comes to a close in 1972 and has been home to industrial tenants since 2000.
