= Ulverston Canal =

Canal in Cumbria, England

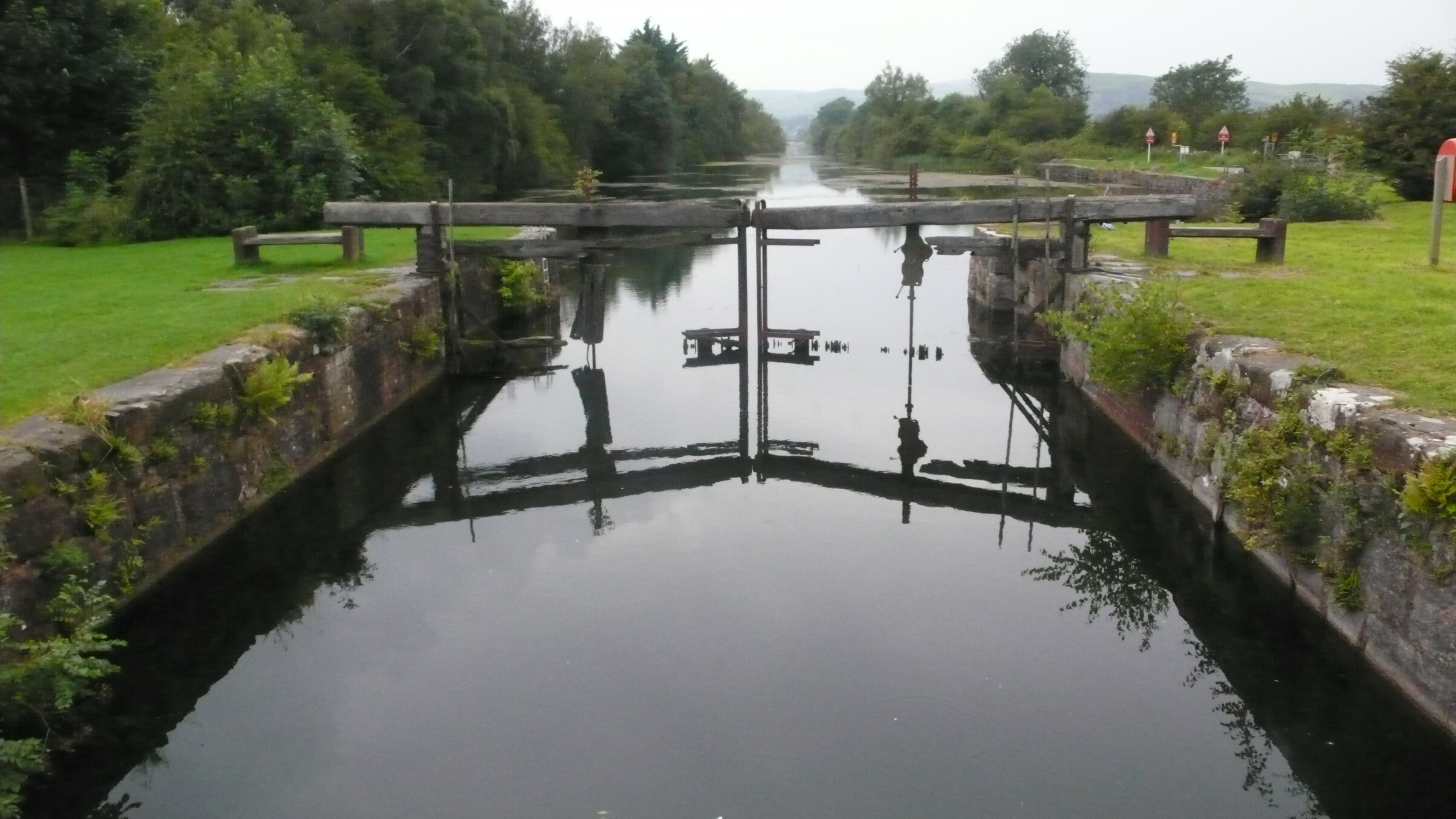
- Original lock gate on Ulverston Canal
- Interactive map of Ulverston Canal

Specifications
- Maximum boat length: 112 ft 0 in (34.14 m)
- Maximum boat beam: 27 ft 0 in (8.23 m)
- Locks: 1
- Status: Closed

History
- Date of act: 1793
- Date completed: 1796
- Date closed: 1945

Geography
- Start point: Ulverston
- End point: Morecambe Bay

The Ulverston Canal is a 1.25-mile (2 km) ship canal that connects the town of Ulverston, Cumbria, England with Morecambe Bay. The waterway, which is entirely straight and on a single level, is isolated from the rest of the UK canal network. It was built so that maritime trading vessels could use the town's port.

Ulverston Canal was built in the late 18th century. Wharves were built in the town to handle the cargo and goods being loaded and unloaded from seagoing vessels. The canal promoted the industrial development of Ulverston. Despite its loss of economic importance with the construction of the Furness Railway in the mid 19th century, the canal remained in commercial operation until the 1940s when it was eventually abandoned. The canal's preservation is now managed by a property management company that receives funding from GlaxoSmithKline, which has a plant adjacent to the canal.

The canal runs between its former sea entrance, known as Canal Foot, at Hammerside Point on Morecambe Bay and its basin and wharves at Ulverston. The 112-foot-long (34 m) sea lock was the only lock on the canal; however, the lock has been sealed with a concrete dam and footbridge. Beside the canal is a sheep and cattle auction and several waterside buildings have been renovated. At its mouth, the Bay Horse Hotel stands on the site of an 18th-century coaching inn; the Cumbria Coastal Way crosses the canal at this point.

== History ==
=== Construction ===
Although it is about 1.25 miles (2.0 km) from the River Leven estuary which is part of Morecambe Bay, the town of Ulverston was declared to be a port in 1774, which allowed goods to be shipped to other canals without the payment of sea duty. Ships of up to 150 tonnes could reach the shore at high water, and 70 vessels were registered there. Trade in slate and ore was growing, and canal mania was gripping the country. A local solicitor, William Burnthwaite. organised a meeting in July 1791 to consider ideas for a canal to improve access to the town. He estimated the cost at £2,000. This sum had been raised by May 1792, but by then the engineer John Rennie had produced proper plans for a ship canal, estimated to cost £3,084, including the construction of a sea lock. By October 1792, around £3,800 had been raised, and the proposers decided to proceed.

Ulverstone Canal Act 1793
- Act of Parliament
- Parliament of Great Britain
- Long title: An Act for making and maintaining a Navigable Cut or Canal from a Place called Hammerside Hill in the Parish of Ulverstone, in the County Palatine of Lancaster, to a Place called Weint End near the Town of Ulverstone aforesaid.
- Citation: 33 Geo. 3. c. 105
- Territorial extent: Great Britain

Dates
- Royal assent: 8 May 1793
- Commencement: 8 May 1793 (Note: The Acts of Parliament (Commencement) Act 1793.)
Other legislation
Relates to	Midland Railway (Oakham Canal Purchase) Act 1846

Status: Current legislation

Text of statute as originally enacted

An act of Parliament for the canal, the Ulverstone Canal Act 1793 (33 Geo. 3. c. 105), received royal assent on 8 May 1793. The act was entitled "An Act for making and maintaining a Cut or Canal from a Place called Hammerside Hill, in the parish of Ulverstone, in the county palatine of Lancaster, to a Place called Weint End, near the town of Ulverstone aforesaid." The act empowered "The Company of Proprietors of the Ulverstone Canal Navigation" to raise amongst themselves, for the purposes of the act, the sum of £4,000 in shares of £50 each, with an additional £3,000 if required.

The contract for the construction of the main canal was given to Pinkerton and Murray, while construction of the entrance lock was awarded to John Lancaster and James Duckworth. Work began on 23 August 1793, when the chairman cut the first sod, and was expected to be completed by September 1794. However, Pinkerton and Murray were also working on the northern end of the Lancaster Canal, and they abandoned the contract in August 1795, when they could no longer pay the wages. H. Baird took on the work, which was finished in October 1796.

The canal was opened in 1796 and provided the town of Ulverston with a port. The channel was 15 feet (4.6 m) deep and 66 feet (20 m) wide, but ship sizes were restricted by the lock, which could accommodate vessels of 100 by 27 feet (30.5 by 8.2 m), drawing between 12.5 feet (3.8 m) and 7.5 feet (2.3 m), depending on the state of the tide. To maintain the water level, a supply was taken from Newland Beck. Delays in construction meant that the final cost was over £9,200, and the opening coincided with a slump in the ore trade. It was not until June 1797 that William Burnthwaite was appointed as clerk, and a project to build a warehouse and toll office began, funded by a further call on the shareholders. Wharves for the transfer of slate and coal were constructed at the same time.

=== Operation ===
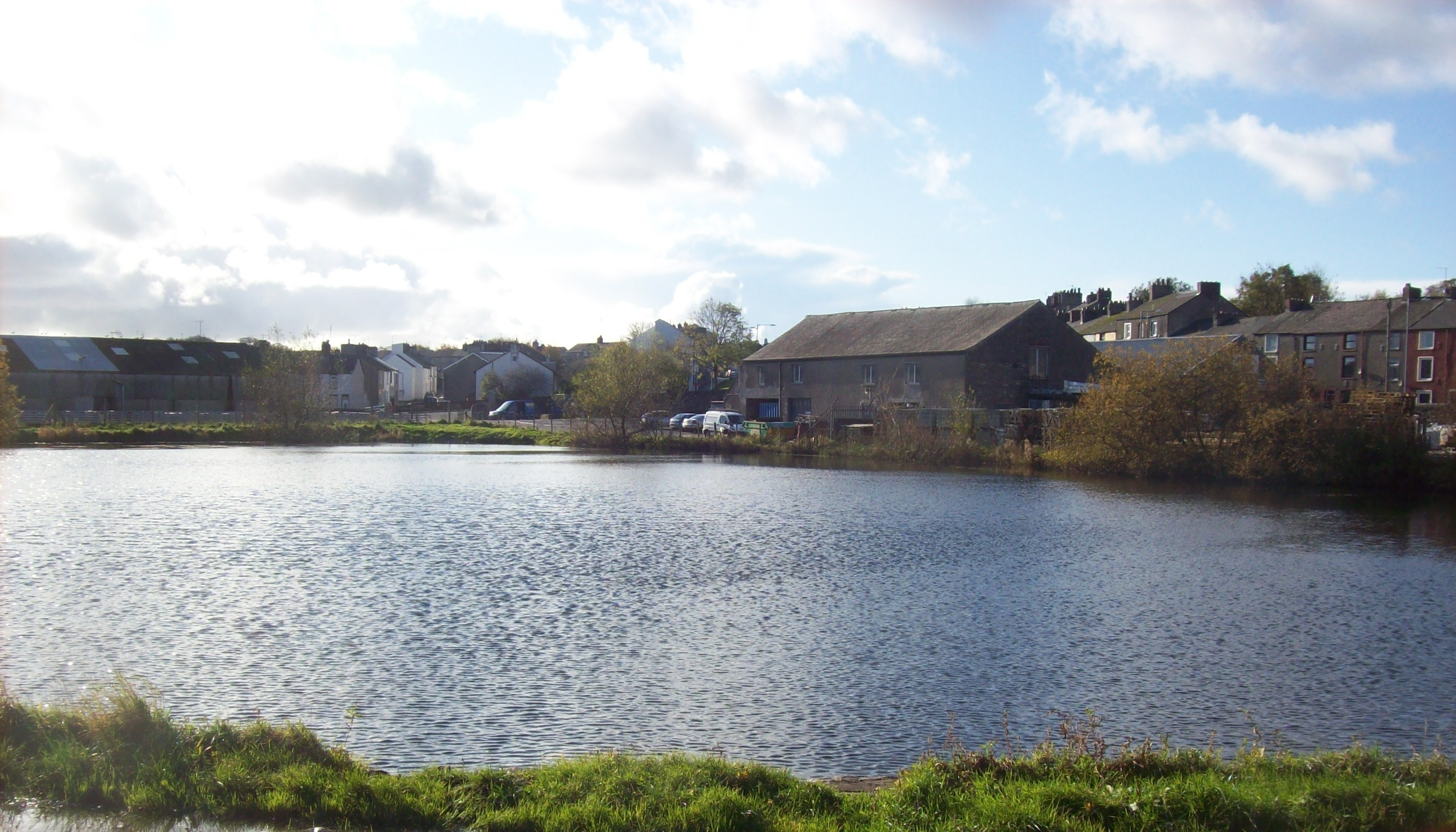
Former wharves and warehouses at Ulverston canal basin

Before the Furness Railway was built, Furness was cut off by the mountainous Lake District on its only landward side; the region was accessed only by crossing the sands of Morecambe Bay, which was often dangerous. A passenger ferry to Liverpool from Ulverston Canal started in 1835, and it was later complemented by a service from Barrow-in-Furness to Fleetwood. A junction was formed with the Lancaster Canal. Coal, culm, and cinders from the Lancaster Canal to the Ulverston Canal were not liable to sea duty. The canal serviced the movement of goods to places as far as Glasgow and Cardiff.

Other industries developed as the canal was used more. Timber-related industries such as charcoal burning and hoop-making were common; shipbuilding, gas and chemical works, rail engineering works, and paper manufacturing activities also provided employment. In the 1800s there was a substantial shipbuilding industry at Ulverston, building wooden sailing ships which were strongly constructed to carry local ore rock cargoes. An example of an Ulverston ship is the barquentine Gaerwen of 249 tons, built in 1878 and later trading from Salcombe.

=== Decline ===
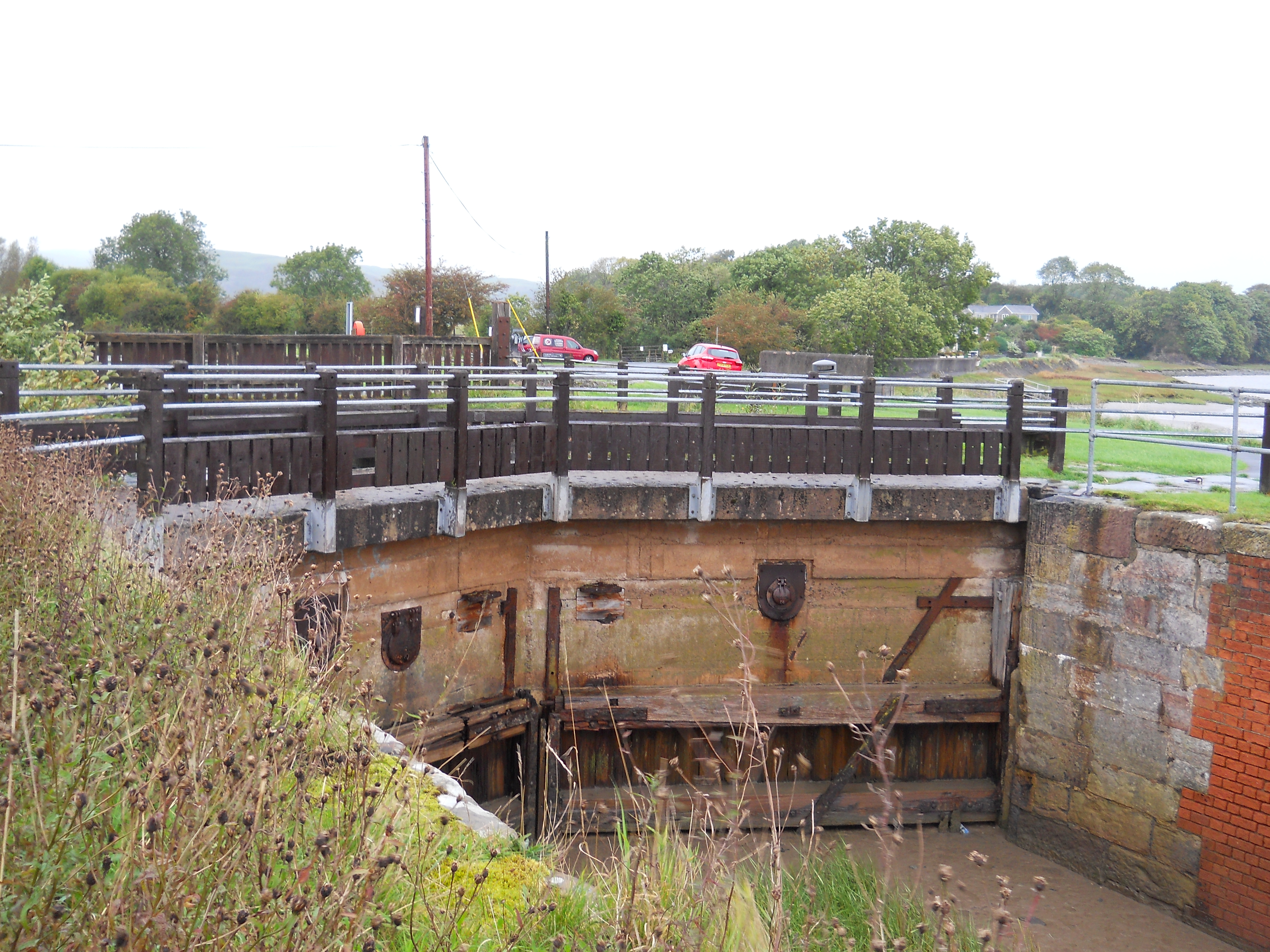
Filled in sea lock at Canal Foot on Ulverston Canal

The opening of the Furness Railway in 1846 seriously damaged the profitability of the canal, which was eventually bought by the railway company. The rise of Barrow-in-Furness as a deep-water port also saw a decline in trade. After 1878, no ships were built in Ulverston. The canal was used commercially until the First World War and was officially abandoned at the end of the Second World War by the London Midland and Scottish Railway (Canals) Act 1944 (8 & 9 Geo. 6. c. ii). It has since been maintained by Ulverston town council, who maintain a walkway on its eastern side. Its western side is still industrialised, with a large GlaxoSmithKline factory (built on the site of the former iron works and paper mills). Glaxo bought the canal from the town council in 1974 and used it as an emergency water reserve. In 2009, GlaxoSmithKline reviewed their operations at Ulverston and later sold the canal to Ulverston Canal Company, a company set up to manage the asset. This is a subsidiary of NPL Estates Ltd, which specialises in land management. A Trust has also been set up by GlaxoSmithKline, to ensure that funds are available for the canal's management, maintenance, and preservation.

== Points of interest ==
Point	Coordinates (Links to map resources)	OS Grid Ref	Notes
Ulverston basin	54.1976°N 3.0837°W	SD294785	
Furness Railway bridge	54.1964°N 3.0793°W	SD296783	
Old railway bridge	54.1936°N 3.0676°W	SD304780	
Entrance lock	54.1903°N 3.0539°W	SD313776	Morecambe Bay

== See also ==
- Canals of Great Britain
- History of the British canal system

== Bibliography ==
- Capita Symonds (2005). "Ulverston Canal Head & Canal Corridor Masterplan" (PDF). South Lakeland District Council. Archived (PDF) from the original on 11 January 2018.
- Gwyn, David (2015). Welsh Slate: Archaeology and History of an Industry. Royal Commission on the Ancient & Historical Monuments of Wales. ISBN 978-1-871184-51-8.
- Hadfield, Charles; Biddle, Gordon (1970a). The Canals of North West England (Vol 1). David and Charles. ISBN 978-0-7153-4956-4.
- Hadfield, Charles; Biddle, Gordon (1970b). The Canals of North West England (Vol 2). David and Charles. ISBN 978-0-7153-4992-2.
- Hunt, Michael (12 April 2010). "Ulverston canal changes ownership". Place North West. Archived from the original on 26 September 2020.
- MacGregor, David R (1977). Square Rigged Sailing Ships. Special Interest Model Books. ISBN 978-0-85242-516-9.
- Priestley, Joseph (1831). Historical Account of the Navigable Rivers, Canals, and Railways of Great Britain. Longman, Rees, Orme, Brown and Green. Archived from the original on 11 March 2016.
- Rothwell, Catherine (1991). Ports of the North West. Printwise Publications. ISBN 978-1-872226-17-0.
