= Listed buildings in Lakes, Cumbria =

Lakes is a civil parish in the Westmorland and Furness district of Cumbria, England. It contains 214 listed buildings that are recorded in the National Heritage List for England. Of these, six are listed at Grade I, the highest of the three grades, 20 are at Grade II*, the middle grade, and the others are at Grade II, the lowest grade. Lakes is a large parish in the Lake District National Park containing the villages of Ambleside, Troutbeck, Rydal, Grasmere, Elterwater, and Chapel Stile, and the valleys of Great Langdale and Little Langdale. Otherwise the parish is rural, including countryside, hills and mountains. Many of the listed buildings are concentrated in the villages, with many dating from the 17th century, and others are scattered in the valleys. Most of the listed buildings are houses and associated structures, shops, farmhouses, farm buildings, bridges, public houses and hotels, and churches with items in the churchyards. Other listed buildings include a former Roman fort, an aqueduct, an AA telephone box, a market cross, and two war memorials.

== Key ==
Grade	Criteria
I	Buildings of exceptional interest, sometimes considered to be internationally important
II*	Particularly important buildings of more than special interest
II	Buildings of national importance and special interest

== Buildings ==
Name and location	Photograph	Date	Notes	Grade
Borran's Field (Galava Roman Fort); 54.42236°N 2.96870°W		Late 1st century	The excavated remains of two Roman forts, the second built in the 2nd century. These consist of the footings of various buildings, and a defensive ditch.	I
St Oswald's Church, Grasmere; 54.45749°N 3.02363°W		14th century	The church was doubled in size between 1490 and 1500 by the addition of a parallel nave to the north. The roof was rebuilt in about 1562, and the church was restored in 1840 by George Webster. It is in roughcast stone with slate roofs, and consists of a double nave, a south porch and a southeast tower. Inside is a monument to William Wordsworth by Thomas Woolner.	I
Cote How; 54.44581°N 2.98264°W		Early 16th century	The house was extended in the 17th century. It has very thick pebbledashed stone walls, buttresses, a slate roof, and two storeys. There is a gabled porch with a Tudor arched head, a gabled wing to the right, and a higher extension to the left.	II
Ash Tree Cottage; 54.43322°N 2.96187°W	—	16th century (possible)	A stone cottage with very thick walls, a slate roof, two storeys and three bays. On the front is a modern timber porch, and the windows are small-paned casements. On the right side is a large projecting stepped chimney.	II
Blindtarn Gill; 54.46465°N 3.04570°W	—	16th century	A house with thick stone walls, a flagged roof, two low storeys, and a wing. On the front are three windows on the ground floor, and two small windows above in gablets.	II
Gatehouse, Croft Hotel; 54.42374°N 2.97684°W	—	16th century	The building was extended in the 17th century. It is in roughcast stone with a slate roof, two low storeys, and an L-shaped plan. The centre block has one fixed window, the other windows are casements, and in the upper floor they are in three half-dormers. To the left a former stable and loft have been converted into a garage. To the right is a projecting gabled wing with two casement windows and two sash windows.	II*
Fell Foot and farm buildings 54.41934°N 3.08195°W		16th century	The oldest part is the north wing, the main block dates from the 17th century, and during the 19th century the building was an inn. The farmhouse is a long building in stone with a slate roof and two storeys. The porch is under a jettied slate-hung gabled projection, and the windows are modern casements. A former cottage, later incorporated into the house, is to the north and has a loft door. To the south are stables with a barn to the rear.	II
High Broadrayn Cottage; 54.47593°N 3.02723°W	—	16th century (possible)	A roughcast stone cottage with a slate roof, two storeys, and a rear wing. The front facing the road has one casement window, and the others are sashes. There is another casement window in the rear wing, and in the right return is a lean-to porch.	II
Outbuilding south of Low House; 54.41486°N 2.91422°W	—	16th century (probable)	This was the original farmhouse, it is in stone with a slate roof, and has two low storeys. There is a two-storey gabled porch, the remains of mullioned windows, a gabled wing, and a lower south wing.	II
Rydal Hall; 54.44860°N 2.98006°W		16th century	A country house that was extended in the following centuries, with the front dating from the 19th century. It is rendered. with stone quoins, moulded architraves, a cornice, a balustraded parapet, and is mainly in two storeys. The garden front has three storeys and a symmetrical front of nine bays, the central three bays forming a full-height bow. Above the ground floor windows are cornices on scrolled brackets.	II*
The Thrang and Thrang Barn; 54.43854°N 3.05122°W	—	16th century	A house and a barn with very thick walls, and the barn has been converted into a house. The Thrang has 17th-century wings, it is rendered, and has two low storeys and two bays.	II
The Travellers Rest; 54.47130°N 3.02558°W		16th century	Originally a coaching inn, it is in roughcast stone with a slate roof and two storeys. There are two blocks, stepped down a hillside, and all the windows are sashes. The upper block, to the left, has four windows on the ground floor and two above, and in the lower block there are two doors with porches, six windows on the ground floor and five above.	II
Undermount; 54.44781°N 2.98161°W	—	16th century	A house that was later extended, at one time it was an inn, and most of it dates from the 19th century. It is in stone with a slate roof, and has a T-shaped plan. There are two storeys and three bays, a former barn to the right incorporated into the house, and a rear single-storey wing with three bays. On the front is a porch, and the windows have diamond panes, stone lintels, sills, and hood moulds.	II
Underhelm Farmhouse; 54.46872°N 3.03155°W	—	16th century (possible)	The farmhouse is in roughcast stone with a slate roof, two storeys and three bays. There is a central doorway and casement windows. To the right is a lower wing that probably originated as a farm building.	II
Wall End Farmhouse and barns 54.44018°N 3.10698°W		16th century (probable)	The oldest part is the barn to the southeast, the farmhouse and the other barns dating from the 17th century. The farmhouse is in roughcast stone with very thick walls, a slate roof, two storeys, and four bays. On the front is a gabled porch containing a stone bench, some of the windows are casements, and others are sashes. The southeast barn has a lean-to canopy on two sides, shippons at the rear, and inside are three crucks. The other barns, to the north, form an L-shaped plan.	II
Jesus Church, Troutbeck; 54.41722°N 2.90600°W		1562	The tower was added in 1736, and alterations were made in the 19th century. The church is in slatestone with freestone dressings and a slate roof. It consists of a nave and a chancel under a single roof, and a west tower. The tower has three stages, clock faces on the west and south sides, and an embattled parapet with corner merlons. The five-light east window is Perpendicular in style, and inside the church is a west gallery.	II*
Brimmer Head Farmhouse and farm building 54.46720°N 3.04373°W	—	1574	The farmhouse was extended in 1870. It is in stone with a slate roof, and has two storeys. The original part has three bays, a central doorway, mullioned windows, and two gablets above. The extension to the left has a bay window and a gable. Farm buildings extend to the right, and include shippons and a loft above.	II
Eltermere Hotel; 54.43107°N 3.03800°W		Late 16th century	Originally a house, later a hotel, it was extended in the 17th century and in about 1700, and the front dates from 1756. The building is in stone with slate quoins, a slate roof, and slate-hung gable ends. There are two storeys and a basement, the entrance front facing the lake has three bays and there is a rear wing. In the central bay two Doric columns carry a canted oriel window above which is a small gable. A double flight of steps with railings leads up to the doorway that has a moulded surround and a cornice on scrolled brackets. The outer bay contains sash windows with mullions, and in the gable ends there are lunette windows in the basements.	II
Rydal Mount; 54.44879°N 2.98240°W		Late 16th century	The oldest part of the house is the east block, the west wing was added in the 17th century, a cross-wing in about 1700, and another block in about 1750. It was the home of the poet William Wordsworth from 1813 to 1850, and has since been converted into a museum. The house is in stone with slate roofs, the main block has three storeys, and the other parts have two. The main front has five bays, the windows are sash windows, there is a broad bay window in the garden front, and at the entrance is a gabled porch.	I
High Scorecrag Farmhouse and farm building 54.46119°N 3.03540°W	—	c. 1600	A stone farmhouse with a slate roof, two storeys and three bays. In the ground floor is a door with Gothic tracery, a fixed window, and a sash window, and in the upper floor are three sash windows in half-dormers. On the left is a small lean-to containing bee boles, and to the right at right angles are a barn and stables.	II
Low Scorecrag; 54.46113°N 3.03402°W	—	c. 1600	A stone house, later divided into two dwellings, with a flagged roof, two storeys, three bays, and a lower rear wing. On the front are two doors and sash windows, and in the rear wing the windows are casements.	II
Town End and outbuildings 54.41246°N 2.91495°W		1626	A wing was added to the rear in the late 17th century, and a cross-wing in the 18th century. It is in stone with a slate roof, two storeys, and an L-shaped plan. The windows in the earlier part are mullioned, and there is a slate dripstone over the ground floor windows. In the cross-wing is an oriel window.	I
Low House; 54.41513°N 2.91436°W	—	1627	A stone house, partly roughcast and partly stuccoed, with a slate roof. It has two storeys, four bays, and a rear wing. The windows are square with a dripstone, and there is a staircase wing in the angle at the rear.	II
Church Stile Cottage; 54.45793°N 3.02357°W		1630	Originally a school, later a shop, it is in rendered and roughcast stone with a flagged roof. The main part has a single storey, a door and a small square window with casements. At the rear are two low storeys and similar windows.	II
Albert Moore's Barn; 54.43342°N 2.96235°W	—	17th century (or earlier)	The barn is in pebbledashed stone with a roof of Westmorland green slate. It has a single storey, two bays of open cruck timber framing, and there are two cart entrances.	II
Bell Hill; 54.41623°N 2.91395°W	—	17th century	A stone cottage, mainly roughcast, with a slate roof, and two low storeys. On the front is a gabled porch containing a slate bench, three small square windows in each floor, and a central staircase window.	II
Birk Howe Farmhouse; 54.42032°N 3.05869°W	—	17th century	This originated as a farmhouse and a cottage and was later combined into one dwelling. It is in stone with a slate roof and two low storeys. The house has three bays, an open gabled porch, mullioned windows on the ground floor, and modern casement windows above. The former cottage to the left also has a gabled porch, and its windows are varied. To the left is a lean-to shed, and to the right is a stable.	II
Blea Tarn House; 54.43392°N 3.08829°W		17th century	The house has thick stone walls, a slate roof, two low storeys, and four bays. On the front is an open gabled stone porch containing a slate bench, and a timber porch to the left. The windows are a mix of sashes and casements.	II
Bridge End; 54.43364°N 3.03849°W	—	17th century	A stone house with a flagged roof, two storeys, a recessed former stable at the right, and a rear wing. There are three casement windows in the ground floor with a continuous dripstone above, and two windows in the upper floor.	II
Bridge Syke; 54.43393°N 3.03816°W		17th century	A row of three stone cottages with a slate roof and two storeys. There are three doors and the windows are casements.	II
Britannia Inn; 54.43452°N 3.03782°W		17th century	The public house is in roughcast stone with a slate roof and two storeys. On the front is a small gabled porch, and the windows are sashes. To the left is a recessed bay with a bay window in the angle, and at the rear is a gabled wing.	II
Church Stile Studio; 54.45788°N 3.02415°W		17th century (probable)	The oldest part is the lower rear wing, the main block dating probably from the 18th century. Originally a single house, it was later divided to include an information centre. The building is in roughcast stone with thick walls, a slate roof, two storeys and four bays. The windows are sashes.	II
Crag Head; 54.42932°N 3.01636°W	—	17th century	A stone house with a slate roof and two low storeys. On the ground floor is a doorway and four windows with dripstones, and there are three windows in the upper floor. Attached to the house are stables and a lean-to shed.	II
Dockray Cottage; 54.46034°N 3.02467°W	—	17th century	A stone house with a flagged roof, two low storeys, three bays, a low single-storey extension to the right, and a low rear wing. On the front is a gabled porch containing slate benches, horizontal-sliding sash windows on the ground floor, and casement windows in the upper floor and the extension.	II
Dove Cottage; 54.45432°N 3.01643°W		17th century	The cottage was once the home of William and Dorothy Wordsworth, and is now open to the public. It has two storeys, and consists of two blocks at right angles to each other, with a porch in the angle. The front facing the road has two bays, and contains windows with small leaded diamond panes. After the Wordsworths left the cottage, it was occupied by Thomas De Quincey.	I
Ghyll Foot; 54.47696°N 3.03236°W	—	17th century	Originally one dwelling, later two cottages, it is in roughcast stone, with thick walls on a boulder base, a slate roof, two storeys and five bays. The windows are mullioned, most are casements, and there is one oriel window.	II
Glen Rothay Hotel; 54.44697°N 2.98327°W		17th century	The hotel originated as an inn, and was altered and enlarged in the 19th century in Gothick style. It is in stone, partly roughcast, with slate quoins, a slate roof, and two storeys. The outer bays are gabled, in the centre is a gabled porch with a Tudor arch, above which is an oriel window. The windows are casements with small panes and pointed lights. Inside the older part are an inglenook and a bressumer.	II
Goodybridge House and barn 54.46447°N 3.03064°W		17th century	A roughcast stone house with a slate roof, two low storeys, three bays, and a low rear wing. Above the central modern door is a semicircular shell-hood with a gable. The windows are casements, and above the ground floor windows is a dripstone. The attached barn is said to contain medieval crucks.	II*
Hart Head; 54.44923°N 2.98225°W	—	17th century	A roughcast stone house with a slate roof and two storeys. The windows are modern.	II
High Fold; 54.41659°N 2.91351°W	—	17th century	The house, which was extended in the 19th century, is partly in stone rubble and partly in drystone walling. It has a slate roof and two storeys, and in the angle between the wings is a porch containing slate benches.	II
High Green Farmhouse and outbuildings 54.42454°N 2.90787°W	—	17th century	The farmhouse and outbuildings are in stone with slate roofs. The house has two storeys, three bays, casement windows, and slate dripstones. To the rear at right angles is a long range of farm buildings with a canopy over the barn entrance, and at right angles is a hay loft entered by a ramp.	II
Howe Top Farmhouse; 54.45220°N 3.01391°W	—	17th century	A stone farmhouse with a slate roof, two storeys, two bays, and a rear extension. On the front is an off-centre open gabled porch containing slate benches. The windows are mullioned and contain casements. Above the ground floor windows are dripstones.	II
Jaunie Wife House and barn 54.42278°N 2.90950°W	—	17th century	The house and barn are in Lakeland stone with a Westmorland slate roof. The house has two storeys, five bays, a single-storey outshut to the right, and a two-bay stepped outbuilding to the left. Further to the right is a former outbuilding with external steps leading to a first floor door. The windows are mullioned and transomed, and most have slate hood moulds. The barn to the left has stepped outshuts.	II
Kitty Hall; 54.43208°N 3.03746°W	—	17th century (probable)	A stone house with a slate roof. On the front is a gabled wing or porch.	II
Knott House Farmhouse with adjoining farm building 54.46828°N 3.02062°W	—	17th century	A stone farmhouse with a slate roof, two storeys and three bays. On the front is a low gabled porch containing side benches, and the windows are modern. Adjoining the house at right angles to the north, and built in drystone walling, are a barn, shippons and loft.	II
Lancrigg; 54.46732°N 3.03425°W	—	17th century	The farmhouse was modernised in about 1850. It is in roughcast stone, and has a slate roof with round chimneys.	II
Loughrigg Fold; 54.43024°N 3.01684°W	—	17th century	A stone house with a slate roof, two storeys, and a gabled hood above the door. In the ground floor are four windows with hood moulds, and in the upper floor are five irregularly-spaced modern casement windows.	II
House to northwest of Loughrigg How; 54.43245°N 3.01114°W	—	17th century	A stone house with a slate roof. There are two storeys, and the windows are modern.	II
House to southeast of Loughrigg How; 54.43216°N 3.01049°W	—	17th century	A roughcast stone house with a slate roof, two storeys and three bays. The windows are modern casements with wooden surrounds.	II
Low Broadrayn Farmhouse and attached building 54.47498°N 3.02617°W	—	17th century	A stone farmhouse built on boulders, with a slate roof, two storeys and six bays. Three of the windows are sashed, and the others are casements. To the north, and under the same roof, are shippons and other outbuildings.	II
Lowfield and former cottage 54.42784°N 2.96171°W	—	17th century (possible)	A roughcast stone house with a flagged roof, two storeys and six bays. The second and third bays at the rear are gabled, the second bay contains a round arched porch and a window above with a pointed arch, and in the third bay is a stair window. The other windows are sashes. At the northeast and at right angle is a former roughcast cottage with a slate roof, two storeys, sash windows, and a timber arched porch with a cornice.	II
Low or South Fold; 54.41572°N 2.91411°W	—	17th century	The house is in stone with a slate roof and two storeys. The south front is roughcast with two bays and a lean-to bee bole on the left. In the rear wing are mullioned windows and an oriel window with five lights, and in the gable end external steps lead up to a loft door.	II
Barns north of Low House; 54.41530°N 2.91445°W	—	17th century	The outbuildings, including barns, are in stone.	II
Mathew How; 54.41422°N 2.91505°W	—	17th century	The house was later extended and altered. It is in stone and has a Westmorland slate roof with a stone ridge, two storeys, and an L-shaped plan. The east front of the main block has three bays, in the centre is a French window, and the other windows are sashes, with a small rectangular window to the right in the upper floor. In addition to sash windows, the rear wing has a four-light mullioned window, a stair window, and a gabled dormer.	II
Middlefell Place Farmhouse and shippons 54.44488°N 3.10405°W		17th century	The farmhouse and attached shippons are in stone with a slate roof. The farmhouse has two storeys, a gabled porch containing a stone bench, three windows on the ground floor, and four square windows above. The shippons continue to the left.	II
Millbeck Farmhouse and farm building 54.45003°N 3.08860°W	—	17th century	The farmhouse and farm building are in stone with a slate roof. The house has two storeys, three bays, and an extension to the right. There is a small mullioned window on the ground floor, and the other windows are modern casements. To the left is a stable with a loft under a higher roof.	II
Mill Brow Farmhouse and barns 54.42465°N 3.00895°W	—	17th century	The farmhouse and barns are in stone with slate roofs. The farmhouse has two storeys and three bays. On the front is a lean-to open porch, a long horizontal window in the ground floor, and sash windows above. The house is flanked by higher barns on both sides with ventilation slits.	II
Cottage, New Dungeon Ghyll; 54.44890°N 3.08921°W		17th century	A stone cottage on natural boulders, with a slate roof, two storeys, three bays, and a lean-to on the left. On the front is an open gabled porch containing a slate bench, and the windows are sashes.	II
Oaks Farmhouse; 54.43366°N 3.01624°W	—	17th century	A stone farmhouse with a slate roof, two storeys and three bays. The windows are modern, probably in 18th-century openings.	II
Old School House and barn 54.43348°N 2.96112°W	—	Mid 17th century (probable)	Originally a manor house, a wing was added later to the east, there are two gabled wings at the rear, and the house has since been internally divided. It has thick stone walls, a stone flag roof, and five round chimneys. The windows have chamfered mullions and large oak lintels. To the west is a low barn at right angles, with ventilation slits and a hood mould.	II
Pye Howe; 54.44957°N 3.06916°W	—	17th century	A stone house with a slate roof, two storeys, three bays, and an extension with a catslide roof at the rear. In the centre of the front is a gabled porch, the windows are modern, and above the ground floor windows is a slate dripstone.	II
Queens Head Inn; 54.42606°N 2.90484°W		17th century	The inn, which has been much restored, is in stone with a slate roof and two storeys. On the south front are three gables and a stone porch. In the right return, facing the road, is a two-storey bay window with mullions. In the rear wing, which was originally the stables, is a timber gallery.	II
Raw Head Farmhouse; 54.45110°N 3.07480°W	—	17th century	A stone farmhouse with a slate roof, two storeys, and an L-shaped plan. The main block has a symmetrical three-bay front, and a single-storey wing projecting forward at the west end. On the front is a lean-to canopy under which is a door and a five-light window. Elsewhere there are small windows with small panes. In the gable end are bee boles with a slate slab.	II
Robin Lane Cottages; 54.41490°N 2.91575°W	—	17th century	A pair of roughcast stone cottages with a slate roof, two storeys and four bays. The windows are mullioned, and above the ground floor windows is a slate dripstone.	II
Robinson Place; 54.44731°N 3.06233°W	—	17th century	The house is in roughcast stone with a slate roof, two low storeys and three bays. To the left is a lean-to bay window and the other windows are a mix of sashes and casements. In the left gable end is a bay window and a doorway.	II
Rock Cottage and Wayside; 54.42337°N 2.97744°W	—	17th century	A pair of roughcast stone cottages with a slate roof and two low storeys. The windows are sashes with dripstones in the ground floor, and in half-dormers in the upper floor. Rock Cottage has a timber gabled porch, and Wayside has a doorway in the gable end with a gabled hood.	II
Rose Cottage and Wisteria Cottage; 54.43437°N 3.03713°W	—	17th century (probable)	A pair of stone cottages with a flagged roof, and two low storeys. There are three doors, two with gabled hoods, and four small-paned windows in each floor.	II
Rossett Farmhouse and barn 54.44730°N 3.09177°W	—	17th century	A stone farmhouse with a slate roof, two low storeys and four bays. On the front is an open gabled porch, and the windows are replacements. The attached barn, which is probably older than the farmhouse, contains three bays of crucks.	II
Scroggs; 54.43599°N 3.01677°W	—	17th century	A roughcast stone house with a slate roof, two storeys, and three bays. All the windows are modern.	II
Side House Farmhouse; 54.44487°N 3.08784°W		17th century	The farmhouse is in stone with a slate roof, two storeys, a rear wing with two low storeys, and a single-storey extension to the left. In the main part is a central doorway, and the windows are casements, two on the ground floor and three above.	II
Slater's Bridge; 54.41780°N 3.06164°W		17th century	A packhorse bridge crossing River Brathay. From the south side a segmental arch crosses to a natural boulder in the middle of the river. This is in slate, and it has a span of 15 feet (4.6 m) and voussoirs 3.5 feet (1.1 m) long. To the north is a causeway of slate slabs on slate supports.	II*
Stool End Farmhouse and barns 54.44159°N 3.11734°W		17th century	A stone farmhouse with flagged roofs, two storeys, and two bays. It has two parallel ranges, the rear range being in cobbles and slate. On the front is a gabled porch containing a slate bench, and the windows are of varying types. To the southeast is a stone barn with ventilation slits, and to the northeast is a barn and a shippon in stone and slate with a slate roof.	II
The Bield and barn 54.42365°N 3.06251°W	—	17th century	The farmhouse is in roughcast stone with a flagged roof, two storeys and five bays. The doorway has a gabled slate hood, and the windows are casements. The barn, attached to the right and higher, is in stone with a corrugated roof and ventilation slits.	II*
The Haven; 54.43407°N 2.96258°W	—	17th century	A house in roughcast stone with two storeys, a front of three bays, a gabled projection on the right, and a rear wing. In the centre is a timber gabled porch, the windows are sashes, and in the projection is an arched window.	II
The Mount; 54.44853°N 2.98199°W	—	17th century (probable)	A row of three stone cottages with a slate roof, two storeys and three bays, the right bay being gabled. Between the first and second bay is a gabled porch containing two round-headed entrances, and in the third bay is a similar porch with one entrance. The windows are casements with hood moulds.	II
Thornthwaite; 54.42661°N 2.90404°W	—	17th century (probable)	A roughcast stone cottage with thick walls and a slate roof, built into a hillside. There are two low storeys at the right end, and one at the left end. On the front are windows, some are casements, some are new, with dripstones, and to the left is a door with a slate gabled hood. At the rear, external stone steps lead up to a doorway under the eaves.	II
Thrang Farmhouse and barn 54.43854°N 3.05080°W	—	17th century	The farmhouse is in stone with a slate roof, two storeys and two bays. Above the doorway is a gabled hood, and the windows are square. To the left is a barn with a right-angled extension containing bee boles.	II
Town Foot Farmhouse; 54.41005°N 2.91536°W	—	17th century	The farmhouse has very thick stone walls. In the gable end facing the road are three storeys with windows, and dripstones along the whole length of the front. On the north side is a porch with a catslide roof and a mullioned window, and on the south front are three square windows in each floor.	II
Town Head Farmhouse; 54.47967°N 3.03082°W	—	17th century	A roughcast farmhouse with a flagged roof, two storeys, and a south front of three bays. On the front facing the road is a doorway, and all the windows are replacements. At right angles is a shippon with drystone walls.	II
Underhelm Cottage; 54.46856°N 3.03140°W	—	17th century (possible)	The cottage is in stone with a slate roof, two low storeys, two bays, and a lean-to extension on the left. In the centre of the front is a gabled porch with a segmental arch, and the windows are casements.	II
Walthwaite and attached buildings 54.44102°N 3.04402°W	—	17th century	A long low stone building with two storeys, five bays, and an L-shaped plan. On the front is a gabled porch and sash windows. In the wall is a pigeon cote, by the side of the wall is a well head, there is an attached cottage, and a barn with mullioned windows and a spinning gallery.	II*
Willy Goodwaller Bridge; 54.46950°N 3.04821°W	—	17th century	A packhorse bridge carrying a track across Far Easedale Gill, it is in stone, with long voussoirs, and is about 11 feet 6 inches (3.51 m) wide.	II
Wilsons Place; 54.42158°N 3.05254°W	—	17th century	Originally a farmhouse and an attached cottage, later combined into one dwelling, it is in stone with a slate roof. There are two low storeys, and seven bays, the left bays being lower. On the front is a slate porch containing a bench.	II
Wood Farmhouse; 54.40586°N 2.93470°W	—	17th century	The farmhouse has thick roughcast walls and a slate roof. Attached at the west end are a barn and a shippon, and at the east end is a 19th-century extension with two storeys and a bay window. The main part has three storeys and two lean-to porches.	II*
Yew Tree Cottage; 54.42385°N 2.90818°W	—	17th century	A stone house with thick walls, a slate roof, two storeys, and a south front of two bays containing two half-dormers. At the rear is a wing at right angles containing a gallery, and beyond that is a barn.	II
The Nook Cottage; 54.43588°N 2.96390°W	—	1661	The cottage was altered or extended in 1818, and is in roughcast stone with a flagged roof. It has an L-shaped plan, there are two storeys and three bays. In the centre is a wide porch containing benches and it has a slate gable with segmental-arched bargeboards. All the windows are modern casements.	II
Barn at Town End; 54.41217°N 2.91478°W		1666	The barn is in stone with a slate roof, and it has an H-shaped plan. The wings are gabled, in the ground floor are shippons, above are lofts, and there are ventilation slits. In the centre a ramp leads up to barn doors, and there is a gallery and mullioned windows. There is a dated panel on a lintel. To the south is a later extension with a lean-to canopy over the entrance.	II*
2–11 Church Street; 54.43071°N 2.96351°W	—	Late 17th century	A terrace of roughcast stone cottages with flagged roofs. They have two low storeys and each cottage has one or two bays. There are some casement windows, but most windows are sashes.	II
Ashton Cottage, Little Beck and Raesbeck; 54.43316°N 2.96079°W	—	Late 17th century	Three stone cottages with flagged roofs and two storeys. Ashton House on the right has two square windows in each floor. Raesbeck on the left has a central stone gabled porch, two sash windows on the ground floor and three in the upper floor. Little Beck forms the rear wing of Raesbeck.	II
High Sweden Bridge; 54.45241°N 2.95923°W		Late 17th century	This was a packhorse bridge, and it now carries a track over Scandale Beck. The bridge is in stone, and it consists of a single arch without parapets.	II
Low Sweden Bridge; 54.44133°N 2.96487°W		Late 17th century	The bridge carries a track over Scandale Beck. It has a modern parapet and railing.	II
Nook End Farmhouse and farm building 54.44031°N 2.96527°W	—	Late 17th century	The farmhouse is in roughcast stone with a flagged roof, and two storeys. It has an L-shaped plan, with a main block of three bays, and a single-storey rear wing. On the front is a gabled porch, and most of the windows are sashes. Adjoining the farmhouse are outbuildings also with an L-shaped plan; these include a barn, a stable and hay loft. There is a continuous hood mould continuing on both parts.	II
Pavement End Farmhouse; 54.45678°N 3.02798°W	—	Late 17th century	The farmhouse is in Lakeland stone with a roof of Westmorland slate. It has an L-shaped plan, two storeys, and a front of four irregular bays. The left bay protrudes, it is gabled and contains a lean-to porch on wooden posts. The windows are of various styles all with 20th-century frames, and at the rear is a four-light dormer. There is an attached single-story stone outbuilding with massive quoins and a doorway with a large stone lintel.	II
Royal Oak Hotel; 54.43111°N 2.96247°W		Late 17th century	The public house is in roughcast stone, with a slate roof, two low storeys, four bays, and a wing to the left. The door has a plain stone architrave and a cornice, and the windows are sashes. In the roof are two gabled dormers.	II
Barns and stables, Rydal Hall; 54.44876°N 2.97865°W	—	Late 17th century	The barns, stables and other outbuildings are to the north and east of the hall, They are in stone, and form an irregular plan.	II*
Bridge, Rydal Hall; 54.44825°N 2.97837°W		Late 17th century	The bridge crosses Rydal Beck in the grounds of the hall. It is in stone, and consists of a single segmental arch.	II*
Summer house, Rydal Hall; 54.44835°N 2.97850°W		Late 17th century	The summer house is a small stone building beside Rydal Beck.	II*
The Toft; 54.41434°N 2.91522°W	—	Late 17th century	A former farmhouse in slatestone with a Lakeland slate roof. There are two storeys and four bays. On the front is a gabled porch, and the windows are replacement casements. Inside the house is an inglenook and a bressumer.	II
Golden Rule Hotel; 54.43349°N 2.96254°W		c. 1683	A public house in pebbledashed stone with a slate roof, two storeys and seven bays. On the front is a gabled porch, and the windows are sashes. There is a wing at right angles that were originally stables and coachmen's rooms.	II
Beckside; 54.42407°N 2.90899°W	—	1686	The house, which has been modernised, has roughcast thick stone walls, a slate roof, two storeys and three bays. The door and windows are modern and there is a lozenge-shaped datestone.	II
Town Head Cottage; 54.47942°N 3.03094°W	—	1688	The cottage has thick stone walls, a flagged roof, and two storeys. The windows are modern casements in original openings, and in the east wall is a dated panel.	II
Mortal Man Inn; 54.42332°N 2.90906°W		1689 or before	A public house that has since been altered. It has quoins, three storeys, gables, and modern windows. On the south front are five gabled half-dormers.	II
Grasmere Rectory; 54.45706°N 3.02423°W	—	1690	Originally a plain house, it was enlarged in the 19th century. The rectory is roughcast with a slate roof and two storeys. There are four bays and lower wings on each side. On the front is a porch with a round-headed opening, and the windows are sashes.	II
Buttments Farmhouse and Cottage; 54.41637°N 2.91424°W	—	1692	The farmhouse is in stone with a slate roof, two storeys, three bays, and small-paned windows. At the west end is a large round chimney, partly protruding, on brackets. To the left is a lean-to wing with a porch, and to the right is a lower cross-wing.	II
Old Farm Cottage, Y H A Cottage and St Martin's; 54.43315°N 3.03847°W	—	1692	A row of three stone cottages with slate roofs and two storeys. Old Farm Cottage and Y H A Cottage were originally a farmhouse, and have casement windows and modern doors. St Martin's, to the right, is slightly higher, and has a gabled porch, a casement window in-the ground floor and two sash windows above, and a rear wing.	II
Robin Ghyll; 54.44633°N 3.06087°W	—	c. 1700 or earlier	A stone house with very thick rendered walls, a slate roof, two low storeys, four bays, and modern extensions at the rear. The left bays is gabled, on the front is an open timber porch, and most of the windows are modern casements. Over the ground floor windows is a slate dripstone.	II
Great House Barn; 54.42133°N 2.91133°W	—	Late 17th or early 18th century	The barn is in Lakeland stone, partly rendered, with quoins and a roof of stone-slate. There are two storeys and five bays. The barn has a ramped central entrance and two tiers of ventilation slits.	II
Elterwater Bridge; 54.43374°N 3.03815°W		1702	The bridge, which has subsequently been widened, carries a road over Great Langdale Beck. It is in stone, and consists of a single segmental arch with a level parapet.	II
The Nab; 54.44887°N 2.99634°W		1702	A stone house with a slate roof, two storeys, and five bays. On the front is a gabled porch with a segmental-headed entrance containing a bench. The windows are three-light casements with arched lights.	II*
Low Fold; 54.41612°N 2.91419°W	—	1703	A roughcast stone house with a slate roof and two storeys. In the south front are sash windows and a bay window.	II
Forest Side Cottage; 54.46492°N 3.01638°W	—	1704	Originally a smithy and ostler's house, it is in stone with a slate roof, two storeys and four bays. On the front is a gabled porch containing side benches, and the windows are sashes with dripstones over the ground floor windows.	II
Brow Head; 54.43205°N 2.97614°W	—	1706	A roughcast stone house with a slate roof, three storeys and three bays. The windows are casements, there is a dripstone below the top floor, and the house contained a spinning gallery.	II
Bridge House; 54.43318°N 2.96350°W		1723	The house is on a bridge crossing Stock Ghyll linking Ambleside Hall to its orchard. It was originally a summer house, and later used as a store. The bridge consists of a depressed segmental arch with a span of about 15 feet (4.6 m). On the bridge is a small stone house with a slate roof, two low storeys, one bay, and one small room on each floor. From the road steps lead down to the stream, two steps lead up to the lower floor door, and a spiral flight of eight steps leads to the upper floor doorway.	I
Cross Brow; 54.42797°N 2.96140°W	—	Early 18th century	A roughcast stone house with a slate roof and two storeys. There are two sash windows in the ground floor and three above.	II
Gillside; 54.47505°N 3.02317°W	—	Early 18th century (probable)	A stone house with a slate roof, two storeys and four bays. It has a modern door with a gabled hood, and the windows are mainly small square sashes.	II
Low Colwith and farm buildings 54.41927°N 3.03331°W		Early 18th century (probable)	The farmhouse is in slate rubble with a slate roof, two low storeys, and four bays. On the front is an open gabled porch, the windows are small-paned casements, and there is a slate dripstone over the ground floor windows. Farm buildings, including a stone barn, extend to the left.	II
Moss Side; 54.45861°N 3.02535°W	—	Early 18th century (probable)	A pair of roughcast stone cottages with a flagged roof and two storeys. Each cottage has two bays, and a gabled porch.	II
Pearson's Lane; 54.42242°N 2.91064°W	—	Early 18th century (probable)	A stone house that has a slate roof with stepped gables, two storeys and four bays. At the rear is a square window and external steps leading up to a first floor door.	II
Red Lion Hotel (old part); 54.45891°N 3.02501°W		Early 18th century (probable)	The hotel was later extended, and the original part forms the bar wing. It is in stone with a slate roof, and has three storeys and three bays, the central bay being gabled. To the left are a former stable and coach house, the latter having a segmental-headed carriage entrance.	II
Rydal Lodge, Rydal Lodge Cottage and barn 54.44673°N 2.98131°W	—	Early 18th century	The lodge is in roughcast stone with a hipped slate roof, two storeys, four bays on the entrance front, and four bays on the left return facing the road. The round-headed doorway has a moulded and panelled surround and a traceried fanlight. In the left return are a gabled porch and a modern door. The windows are sashes. To the south is a roughcast cottage with a slate roof, two storeys, two bays, and sash windows, and beyond that is a stone barn.	II
Storeythwaite; 54.41993°N 2.91197°W	—	Early 18th century (probable)	A stone house with a slate roof and two storeys. On the front is a wide gabled wing, and the windows are modern with old slate dripstones.	II
The Old House; 54.43353°N 2.96278°W	—	Early 18th century (probable)	A roughcast stone house with a flagged roof, two low storeys, and two bays. There is a central gabled porch, two sash windows and two modern casement windows.	II
North Syke; 54.43333°N 2.96262°W	—	1741	A small stone cottage with a slate roof and two low storeys. There are two sash windows in each floor, and in the upper floor is a bay window. The porch is in the angle with the adjacent house.	II
2 and 3 Bridge Street, Ambleside; 54.43271°N 2.96246°W	—	18th century (probable)	A pair of stone houses with sash windows. No. 2 has a dormer in the roof, and No. 3 has a canted corner.	II
1 Cheapside, Ambleside; 54.43172°N 2.96146°W		18th century	A shop in roughcast stone with a slate roof on a corner site, it has four storeys. The corner is canted, and steps with wrought iron railings lead up to a first floor doorway. The windows are sashes.	II
2 Cheapside, Ambleside; 54.43165°N 2.96153°W	—	18th century	A pair of roughcast shops with three storeys and attics. There are four bays, the right two bays protruding forward. In the left two bays are bow windows with fluted architraves in the lower two floors, and sash windows and an attic window above. The right two bays have a bow window and a door in the ground floor and similar windows above.	II
3 and 4 Cheapside, Ambleside; 54.43159°N 2.96159°W	—	18th century	A pair of stone shops with three storeys and three bays. In the ground floor of No. 3 is a shop front, and No. 4 has a doorway with a fanlight and a shop window. In the upper floors some windows are sashes, and some are modern.	II
1–4 Tom Fold, Ambleside; 54.43378°N 2.96265°W	—	18th century (probable)	A row of four cottages in slate rubble built using the drystone wall technique, with a slate roof and two storeys. Three of the cottages have timber gabled porches, and there are four windows on each floor, most of them sashes.	II
Premises occupied by Brown's Booking Office; 54.43156°N 2.96243°W	—	18th century	The building is in roughcast stone, with a slate roof, two storeys and three bays. In the ground floor are two doorways, and to the right is a shop window with pilasters, a fascia and a cornice. The upper floor contains sash windows.	II
Corbrig and Planetree House; 54.43299°N 2.96376°W	—	18th century (probable)	A pair of houses in slate rubble with slate quoins, and a slate roof. Corbrig to the left has two storeys, two bays, and a timber porch. Planetree House has a central gable, two storeys with an attic, three bays, and an openwork porch with latticed timber posts and a pyramidal roof. The windows in both houses are sashes.	II
Dale End and barn 54.42481°N 3.05510°W	—	18th century	The farmhouse is in roughcast stone with a slate roof, two storeys, three bays, and an L-shaped plan. On the front is an open gabled porch. The barn to the southwest is in stone, and is built into the hillside. There is a lean-to canopy over the entrance.	II
Barn and stable, Forest Side Cottage; 54.46484°N 3.01635°W	—	18th century	The barn and stable are in stone, partly rendered, with a stone-slate roof. There are two storeys, and an L-shaped plan, with a 19th-century protruding gabled wing on the right. The windows in the gable end are sashes with hood moulds, and elsewhere there are doors, windows, a barn entrance, and ventilation loops. (Note: Street View in March 2009 shows that the building has been converted for residential use.)	II
Fox Ghyll; 54.43754°N 2.98322°W		18th century	The house was altered in the 1870s. It is roughcast with a slate roof, two storeys, and a gabled two-bay front. To the left and at right angles is a gabled wing, and at the rear is a service wing. On the front is a wide gabled porch that has a window with ogee Gothic glazing, and the other windows are sashes. At the rear is a mullioned casement window.	II
Ghyll Side; 54.43264°N 2.96275°W	—	18th century (probable)	A stone house with an irregular plan, a square archway to the left, and above on the front are two half-dormers. At the rear are sash windows, some in gabled dormers. Over the archway is a casement window, and under the arch is a shop window.	II
High Fold Farmhouse and railings 54.41696°N 2.91363°W	—	18th century	A roughcast stone house with a slate roof, two storeys and three bays. In the centre is a gabled wooden porch, the windows are sashes and in front of the small garden are iron railings.	II
House to east of High Green; 54.42516°N 2.90750°W	—	18th century (or earlier)	The house is in roughcast stone with a slate roof, and an L-shaped plan. There are two storeys, a south front of three bays, sash windows, and a central gabled porch containing a slate bench. The rear wing is lower, and has mullioned windows.	II
House to north of High Green; 54.42529°N 2.90793°W	—	18th century	A roughcast stone house with a slate roof, two storeys, three bays, and a rear wing. There is a central door, and the windows are sashes.	II
Lane Foot Farm bank barn 54.42226°N 2.91094°W	—	18th century	The barn and associated outbuildings are in stone with quoins and Lakeland slate roofs. The barn has two storeys, and a two-storey projecting central bay, possibly a stable with a hay loft above. The openings include entrances, ventilation slits, a winnowing door, and windows. To the northeast is a two-storey single-bay building with a hipped roof, and separated from the other buildings is a former wash house.	II
Loughrigg Cottage; 54.44212°N 2.97989°W	—	18th century	A roughcast stone house with a slate roof, eaves with triple dentils, two storeys, and three bays. In the ground floor the outer bays contain five-sided bay windows with cornices. In the right gable end is a five-sided porch.	II
Loughrigg Holme and attached building 54.43909°N 2.98259°W	—	18th century	The house, once the home of Edward Quillinan, is in roughcast stone with a slate roof, two storeys and an L-shaped plan. One wing is in drystone walling, and most of the windows are casements with hood moulds. Attached to the south is a stone building.	II
Low Wood Hotel; 54.41021°N 2.94795°W		18th century	Originally a coaching inn, it was extended in 1859. The hotel is mainly in three storeys, and the main block has seven bays, each with a gable. The gable above the entrance is larger, and contains a dated roundel. The windows are sashes, and in front of the middle four bays is an iron balcony on coupled piers. To the right is a three-bay projecting wing. Its entrance faces the courtyard, and has a verandah on clustered columns with Gothic imposts. In the central bay of the front facing the sea is an ogee-headed niche in the ground floor, and the middle floor contains a window with a Tudor arched head and a semicircular ornamental balcony.	II
Old Mill Studios; 54.43285°N 2.96240°W		18th century (probable)	The building is on a site beside Stock Ghyll, and is built on the rock of the river. It is in slate rubble with slate quoins and a slate roof. There are two storeys facing the road, and five facing the river. The windows are sashes, and on the road front are two gabled dormers.	II
Rosebank Barn; 54.42188°N 2.91140°W	—	18th century	The bank barn is in slatestone with quoins, on traces of a boulder plinth, and with a Lakeland slate roof. It has two storeys, a lean-to on the northeast, and contains a stable and a cow house; all have separate entrances. Inside is a full cruck truss.	II
Stock Cottage; 54.43269°N 2.96233°W	—	18th century (probable)	A stone cottage with a slate roof, two storeys and a symmetrical three-bay front. On the front is a central doorway with a hood and sash windows, and above the upper floor windows are blind lunettes. In the right return is a similar doorway and a window in each floor.	II
Premises occupied by Stoneage, The Priest Hole Restaurant, Oxfam; 54.43104°N 2.96266°W		18th century (probable)	A stone building, partly roughcast and partly stuccoed, it has two storeys and an irregular plan. In the ground floor are shop windows with pilasters and a cornice, and above are sash windows.	II
Syke Barn, Troutbeck; 54.42058°N 2.91166°W	—	18th century	The barn is in stone-slate with quoins and a roof of Lakeland slate. It is built into a hillside, and has two storeys and an L-shaped plan. The barn contains an entrance, windows, ventilation slits, and roof lights.	II
Thorney Howe Youth Hostel; 54.46685°N 3.03230°W	—	18th century	The youth hostel is in stone with a slate roof, and has an L-shaped plan. The older wing has two low storeys and small windows. The later wing has two storeys, three bays, slate quoins, a round-arched doorway, and sash windows.	II
Three Shires Inn; 54.42139°N 3.05476°W		18th century	The public house is built in slate rubble and has a slate roof. There are two storeys and four bays. The windows are sashes, and along the front is a verandah incorporating a porch.	II
Arbour, Dove Nest; 54.41429°N 2.94821°W	—	Late 18th century	The building in the garden of Dove Nest is in stone and has an embattled roof. There is a semicircular-arched entrance, and a half-spherical interior.	II
Hall Bank; 54.44822°N 2.98158°W	—	Late 18th century (probable)	A house with incorporated outbuildings to the right, it is in stone with a slate roof and two storeys. There is a gabled porch, and the windows have been modernised. To the right is a garage door and another doorway.	II
Wateredge Hotel; 54.42132°N 2.96326°W		Late 18th century	The hotel has been subsequently extended. It is in stone, the south front is roughcast, it has a slate roof, two storeys and six bays. In the ground floor is a porch and a door, both with Gothic glazing, and the windows are sashes. A timber top storey has been added, and this contains casement windows and a canted window on the end.	II
Dove Nest; 54.41466°N 2.95091°W		1780	A roughcast house with overhanging eaves and two storeys. The main part is gabled, and there are two gabled wings. On the front is a doorway converted into a window, with a stone architrave and a cornice. The windows are sashes, and all the gables have pierced bargeboards.	II
Calgarth Park; 54.39348°N 2.92999°W		1789–90	Originally a country house, and later used for other purposes, including being at one time a hospital, it is rendered, and has a top cornice on brackets. There are three storeys and a symmetrical entrance front of three bays. In the centre is a semicircular porch with Tuscan columns, a cornice, and a round-headed doorway. The windows are sashes in moulded frames, those in the middle floor with Tuscan pilastered architraves and cornices. At the rear, there are four bays with a Doric colonnade, and the main block is flanked by two-storey wings.	II
Scale How; 54.43536°N 2.96452°W	—	c. 1790	Originally a country house in Georgian style, it was remodelled and enlarged in Tudor Gothic style by George Webster in 1824–25, and later became part of a college. The house is stuccoed with stone quoins, and moulded eaves with dentils. There are three storeys and a symmetrical front of three bays. In the centre is a porch with two Tuscan columns, a frieze and a cornice, and this is carried along the front and the sides of the house as a verandah with latticework, pilasters and a cornice. The door has a round-arched fanlight and a broken pediment with fluted consoles. In the ground floor are two Venetian windows, and the windows elsewhere are sashes. At the rear is a single-storey pavilion with a large bow window.	II
Croft Hotel; 54.42426°N 2.97524°W		Before 1796	Originally a country house, it was much altered between 1828 and 1830. The house is stuccoed, and has three storeys, sash windows, and ornamental eaves with gargoyles. On the entrance front is a Gothic porch with three pointed arches, buttresses and an embattled gable. The garden front is flanked by three-sided bay windows with five storeys and embattled parapets. Between the bay windows is an elaborate iron verandah. At the rear is a Tudor arch and a tall stair window.	II
Allan Bank; 54.46023°N 3.02976°W		1805	The house, once occupied by William Wordsworth, was extended in 1834. It is stuccoed and has a slate roof and two storeys, and is in Italianate style. The central block is gabled and has two bays, and is flanked by two-bay wings. In the centre is a gabled porch, and the windows are sashes with moulded hood moulds.	II
St Anne's Court; 54.43382°N 2.96061°W		1812	Originally St Anne's Church, later divided in to flats, it is in stone with a slate roof. It has an embattled west tower with a round window in place of a clock face. The east window is blocked, and along the sides are arched windows with Geometric tracery.	II
Boundary stone (Three Shires Stone); 54.41501°N 3.11523°W		1816	The boundary stone stands at the meeting point of the historic counties of Lancashire, Cumberland and Westmorland, and was erected as a memorial. It consists of a pillar with a rectangular plan about 6 feet (1.8 m) high, and inscribed on one side with initials and the year, and on the other side with "LANCASHIRE".	II
St Mary's Church, Rydal; 54.44736°N 2.98169°W		1823–24	The church was designed by George Webster, and the chancel was added in 1884. The church is built in slatestone with freestone dressings and a slate roof. It consists of a nave with a north porch, a lower chancel, a north organ chamber, and a west tower with a vestry to the south. The tower has three stages, diagonal buttresses in the bottom stage, and corner buttresses in the top stage rising to pinnacles. In the middle stage are clock faces, and at the top is an embattled parapet.	II*
Rothay Manor Hotel; 54.42645°N 2.96850°W	—	c. 1825	Originally a private house, the hotel is in roughcast stone with a slate roof and deeply overhanging eaves. There are two storeys, three bays, and lower single-bay wings. Both storeys have French windows, there is a central doorway, a verandah, and a cast iron balcony. The verandah extends to the wings, and to the east is an octagonal glass house.	II
Mill Cottage; 54.43338°N 2.96353°W	—	Early 19th century	A house in slate rubble with slate quoins and a slate roof. There are three storeys and two bays, with the gable end facing the stream. On the front is a gabled lattice porch and sash windows with slate lintels.	II
Premises occupied by Bowness; 54.43434°N 3.03733°W		Early 19th century	The building is in stone, on a corner site, with three storeys. The corner is canted, it contains a shop door, and there is a shop window on each side. The windows in the upper floors are sashes, those in the top floor with gablets.	II
St Oswald's; 54.45638°N 3.03195°W	—	Early 19th century	A pebbledashed house with a slate roof, two storeys and four bays. To the right is a single-storey extension containing a bay window. The entrance at the rear has a traceried fanlight.	II
The Wray; 54.45614°N 3.03218°W	—	Early 19th century	Possibly retaining some 16th-century material, the house is pebbledashed with a slate roof, two storeys, two bays, and a rear wing. There is a central doorway, the windows are sashes, and in the rear wing is a window containing Gothic tracery.	II
Fox How; 54.43598°N 2.98016°W	—	1832	The house was built as a holiday home for Thomas Arnold, and later used by his son, Matthew. It is in stone with a slate roof, two storeys, and an L-shaped plan. The windows are mullioned and transomed with hood moulds, and there are two dormers in the roof. The porch is in Gothic style.	II*
Town End Boathouse; 54.45230°N 3.01678°W		1834	The boathouse is in Lakeland stone, with quoins, decorative bargeboards, a Westmorland slate roof, and two storeys. In the west front, facing Grasmere, is a semicircular arch, above which is a three-light window with a stepped hood mould. On the south front is a gabled dormer, and in the east front, facing the road, is a doorway with a hood mould, above which is a dated and initialled plaque.	II
Wansfell Holme; 54.41587°N 2.95660°W		1840–41	A country house in stone with two storeys and fronts of five bays, and with gabled wings flanking the south front. The middle three bays on the south front have an elaborate sun room with five pointed arches. Inside it are French windows with Gothic traceried fanlights. Over it are windows in moulded architraves, and above are gables with cusped bargeboards and finials. On the west front are similar gables, and a gabled porch with a Tudor arched entrance and a ribbed vault with a carved boss.	II
The Knoll; 54.43481°N 2.96758°W	—	1845–46	A stone house with slate quoins, a slate roof, and two storeys. It has a square plan, with a gable on each side, and the windows are sashes. On the garden front is a bay window containing mullioned and transomed windows. In an angle is a doorway with a traceried fanlight, and a hood carried on wooden Tuscan columns.	II
Barn to west of Low or South Fold Farmhouse; 54.41573°N 2.91440°W	—	19th century (probable)	The barn is in drystone walling with a slate roof. There are two storeys, with shippons and stables below, and lofts and a barn above. The end wings are joined by a wooden gallery.	II
Old Stamp House; 54.43096°N 2.96241°W	—	Mid 19th century	A stuccoed shop on a corner site with a slate roof, two storeys, and a canted bay on the corner. In the corner bay is a doorway flanked by pilasters, and on both sides are shop windows with pilasters and small lights divided by colonnets. There are similar windows, but with round heads, in the upper floor. The front facing Lake Road is plain with a panel, and in the centre of the Church Street front is a small gable containing a shield.	II
St Mary's Church, Ambleside; 54.43075°N 2.96653°W		1850–54	The church was designed by George Gilbert Scott in Gothic Revival style, and a northeast vestry was added in 1889 by Paley and Austin. It is built in slatestone with sandstone dressings and slate roofs. The church consists of a nave with a clerestory, north and south aisles, north and south porches, a northeast chapel, a chancel with a northeast vestry, and a southeast tower. The tower has four stages, a southeast stair turret, diagonal buttresses with gables, and a broach spire with three tiers of lucarnes, and a weathervane.	II*
Holy Trinity Church, Chapel Stile; 54.44033°N 3.04857°W		1857–58	The church, designed by J. A Cory in mainly Decorated style, is built in local green slate with freestone dressings, a roughcast west front, and a slate roof. It consists of a nave, a north aisle with a vestry, a lower chancel, and a south tower incorporating a porch. The tower has three stages and an embattled parapet.	II
Loughrigg Brow; 54.43141°N 2.97395°W	—	1863	A country house designed by Ewan Christian in Gothic Revival style. It is roughcast, with dormers and windows that are mullioned or mullioned and transomed. Above the door is an inscription reading "God's Providence is my Inheritance".	II
Market Hall; 54.43180°N 2.96178°W		1863	The market hall is in Victorian Gothic style, and is built in slate rubble. It has two storeys, corner buttresses, and gables on the front and sides. On the southeast corner is a three-stage clock tower that is approached by external stone steps. The four clock faces are in gables in the roof.	II
Langdale Chase Hotel; 54.40700°N 2.94665°W		c. 1890	Originally a country house, and later a hotel, it is in Jacobean style. The building is in blue slate with sandstone dressings, and it has an irregular plan and three storeys. Features include bay windows, a small corbelled turret, and a flying bridge leading to a corner tower with a dome.	II
Thickholme Bridge (Thirlmere Aqueduct); 54.40618°N 2.91434°W	—	1893	The aqueduct carries three large pipes with water from Thirlmere to Manchester over the Trout Beck. The pipes are on a ribbed steel deck, and are concealed by cast iron side panels encased in a balustrade. The aqueduct consists of a single segmental arch with decorated spandrels, and it incorporates a footbridge.	II
Langdale War Memorial; 54.44024°N 3.04898°W	—	1920	The war memorial is in the churchyard of Holy Trinity Church, Chapel Stile. It is in Lakeland slate, and consists of a wheel-cross on a two-tiered base, standing on a wall. There are two piers projecting from the wall, and between them is a rectangular table with the names of those lost in the First World War. In the forecourt is another tablet with inscriptions and the names of those lost in the Second World War.	II
Grasmere War Memorial; 54.46116°N 3.02198°W		1921	The war memorial, designed by W. G. Collingwood, is in Westmorland green slate. It consists of a Celtic-style wheel-head cross on a rectangular tapered shaft, standing on a tapered plinth, and sited in a paved and kerbed enclosure. The head has a central boss and interlace carving. On the shaft are panels with symbols of peace and victory. There are inscriptions on the shaft and on the plinth.	II
AA Telephone Call Box; 54.49064°N 3.03605°W		1956	The telephone call box was erected by The Automobile Association. It is a square wooden structure with a cross gabled roof and a central vent.	II
4 Bridge Street, Ambleside; 54.43276°N 2.96264°W	—	Undated	The building is on a site beside Stock Ghyll, and was possibly originally a mill. It is in roughcast slate with a front of three storeys, and four storeys facing the river with a gable. On the main front are sash windows, and at the top is a parapet with a central lozenge, and flanking round chimneys giving the appearance of battlements.	II
5 and 6 Bridge Street, Ambleside; 54.43273°N 2.96267°W	—	Undated	Originally a wing of No. 4 Bridge Street, and later converted into two cottages. They are in stone with a slate roof and a single storey. The windows are sashes, one in a gabled dormer.	II
1–6 Main Street, Elterwater; 54.43476°N 3.03684°W	—	Undated	A terrace of six stone cottages with quoins, a slate roof and two storeys. Most of the windows are sashes. No. 1 is recessed, No. 3 has a gabled porch with a finial, external steps lead to a first floor door of No. 5, and No. 6 has a lean-to extension at the front.	II
1–7 Mill Street, Elterwater; 54.43453°N 3.03713°W	—	Undated	A terrace of seven stone cottages with quoins, a slate roof and two storeys. Most of the windows are sashes. Nos. 1–6 have one window on each floor; No. 7 is lower, with two windows on each floor, and a passage between it and No. 6.	II
1–3 Smithy Brow, Ambleside; 54.43361°N 2.96308°W	—	Undated	A row of three rendered stone houses with flagged roofs and two storeys. There are three modern doors, and the windows are sashes.	II
Becksteps; 54.43346°N 3.03814°W	—	Undated	A row of three stone cottages under a common roof with a small lean-to at the end. There are two storeys, four square sash windows in each floor, and a slate hood mould above the ground floor windows.	II
Church Cottage; 54.44706°N 2.98139°W	—	Undated	A stone cottage with a slate roof, two storeys, three bays, and a lower rear extension. The windows are mullioned and transomed. There are hood moulds above the doorway, and over the windows in the gable end.	II
Former barn, Church Stile Studio; 54.45799°N 3.02425°W	—	Undated	The barn, later used for other purposes, is in slate rubble built in drystone wall method, and a slate roof. It originally had a barn and a shippon on the ground floor, and a hay loft above approached by a ramp.	II
Croft Lodge; 54.42402°N 2.97609°W	—	Undated	Formerly the stables of the Croft Hotel, and later divided into private dwellings, they form two ranges around a cobbled courtyard. The ranges are in stone with slate roofs, and have two or three storeys. Most of the windows are sashes, and both ranges have a gabled centre. In the gable of the south range is a clock face with an elaborately carved wooden surround. In the courtyard are a mounting block, an iron pump, and a stone trough.	II
Fir Bank Quarrymen's Cottages; 54.43533°N 3.04499°W		Undated	A row of four cottages in a slate quarry, they are in stone with a slate roof. They have two storeys and are flanked by lower porches. There are two doors in the centre and one in each porch, and the windows are sashes.	II
Friends' Meeting House; 54.43351°N 2.96316°W	—	Undated	The Friends' Meeting House has later been used for other purposes. It is in roughcast stone with a slate roof, three storeys and a symmetrical front of three bays. The central doorway has a rusticated surround, a rectangular fanlight, and a cornice, and the windows are sashes.	II
Barn, Gillside; 54.47478°N 3.02382°W	—	Undated	The barn is built with drystone walls, and has a drying gallery. Attached to the gable end are shippons.	II
Grasmere Bridge; 54.45716°N 3.02351°W		Undated	The bridge carries a road over River Rothay, and was widened in the 20th century. It is in slate rubble, and consists of a single segmental arch with a slightly arched parapet.	II
Greenend; 54.43402°N 3.03805°W	—	Undated	A stone cottage built into a hillside, with two storeys at the lower end and one at the upper end. To the left is a door with a sash window above, and to the right is another doorway and another sash window.	II
High Colwith; 54.41915°N 3.03429°W		Undated	A stone farmhouse with a slate roof, two storeys and three bays. On the front is a gabled porch with a side entrance and containing a slate bench. To the right of the porch is a small-paned window, and to the left is a small sash window.	II
Barn east of Howe Top Farmhouse; 54.45214°N 3.01363°W	—	Undated	The barn is in stone and has two storeys. A ramp leads to it from the street, and in the gable end are ventilation slits. In the lower part are shippons with a dripstone, and a hay loft above.	II
Howsley Cottage; 54.42359°N 2.97721°W	—	Undated	A house in cottage orné style, it is in roughcast stone with a slate roof, two storeys and four bays. On the front is a verandah incorporating a porch, and the windows are sashes. Attached to the left is a former coach house that is partly embattled and partly gabled. It has a round-headed porch on Tuscan columns, and a round arch containing garage doors.	II
Kirkstone Foot Cottage, Cottage adjoining, and Springwell Cottage; 54.43365°N 2.96255°W	—	Undated	A row of three stone cottages with a slate roof. They have two storeys, and Kirkstone Foot Cottage also has an attic with a gabled dormer; the other two cottages have symmetrical two-bay fronts with a central timber porch. All the windows are 19th-century sashes.	II
Market cross 54.43230°N 2.96234°W		Undated	The cross consists of an octagonal shaft with its head broken off. It stands on stone steps of a later date.	II
Miller Bridge; 54.43195°N 2.97118°W		Undated	The bridge carries a road over River Rothay. It is in stone, and consists of a single segmental arch with a humped deck, and is about 5 feet (1.5 m) wide.	II
North View; 54.43359°N 2.96291°W	—	Undated	A stone house, partly roughcast, with two storeys, and the gable end facing the road. There is a central modern door flanked by sash windows, and in the upper floor are three sash windows.	II
Pelter Bridge; 54.44517°N 2.97881°W		Undated	The bridge carries a road, Under Loughrigg, over River Rothay. It is in stone, and consists of a single arch with a small flood arch to the north. The bridge is narrow, humped, and has slate parapets.	II
Premises occupied by Tyson; 54.43086°N 2.96235°W	—	Undated	A roughcast stone shop with a slate roof, two storeys with an attic, and three bays. The right two bays are gabled, the attic has a round-headed window, and in the upper floor are two sash windows. In the ground floor is another sash window, and to the right is a shop front with pilasters and small window lights divided by colonnets. The left bay contains a sash window in each floor.	II
Barn and cottage, Red Lion Hotel; 54.45871°N 3.02510°W	—	Undated	The barn and adjoining cottage have been converted for other uses. They are in stone, the barn partly rendered, and have stone roofs, and two storeys. The barn has a former loft door on the gable end, and the cottage has external steps up to a loft, a small bow window, and casement windows.	II
Rothay Bridge; 54.42657°N 2.96916°W		Undated	The bridge carries the A593 road over River Rothay. It is built in slate using the drystone wall method, and has flat slate slabs acting as a parapet. The bridge consists of a single segmental arch, flanked by flood arches.	II
Rydal Cottages; 54.44693°N 2.98197°W	—	Undated	Probably originally one house, later divided into two dwellings, it is in stone with a slate roof, two storeys, and an L-shaped plan. To the left is a projecting gabled wing with two windows under hood moulds. To the right is a lean-to porch in the angle. The windows vary, some are mullioned, some are mullioned and transomed, and all have diamond leaded panes.	II
Game larder, Rydal Hall; 54.44930°N 2.97940°W		Undated	The game larder is a structure on the west bank of Rydal Beck in the grounds of the hall. It is square, with a stone lower part, and steps leading up to the upper part, which is in wood and is gabled.	II*
Ice house, Rydal Hall; 54.44942°N 2.97946°W	—	Undated	The ice house is in the wood to the north of the hall. It consists of a small stone chamber, and is partly underground.	II*
Terraces, Rydal Hall; 54.44844°N 2.97993°W		Undated	The terraces to the south of the hall include the balustraded terrace, steps down to a lower terrace, and the surrounding balustrade.	II*
Skelwith Bridge; 54.42155°N 3.01176°W		Undated	The bridge carries the A593 road over River Brathay. It is in stone and consists of two segmental arches with triangular cutwaters in the centre. The parapets are solid, and are almost level.	II
Swan Hotel; 54.46532°N 3.02016°W		Undated	The hotel originated as a coaching inn, and has since been altered and extended. It is in stone with two storeys and sash windows. The oldest part has three bays and a central porch with a gabled hood. Later a bay was added to the north and three bays to the south.	II
The Cottage, Fairview Cottage and Nos. 3 to 6 Fair View Road; 54.43326°N 2.96131°W		Undated	A row of six cottages in slate with two storeys. They have porches, and the windows are sashes.	II
Barn, Underhelm Farm; 54.46886°N 3.03120°W	—	Undated	A large barn in stone with slate quoins, there are shippons on the gable end, a hay loft in the middle, two parallel dripstones, and ventilation slits.	II
Wordsworth group of graves 54.45934°N 3.02401°W		Undated	The graves are in the southeast corner of the churchyard of St Oswald's Church. They consist of twelve headstones to members of the Wordsworth and Quillinan families, surrounded by iron railings.	II*
Wordsworth Museum; 54.45400°N 3.01653°W	—	Undated	Probably originally a cottage, later converted into a museum, it has drystone walls, a slate roof, and two large round chimneys. The windows are mullioned.	II

== Notes and references ==
=== Sources ===
- Historic England, "Borran's Field (Galava Roman Fort), Lakes (1244785)", National Heritage List for England
- Historic England, "Church of St Oswald, Lakes (1245157)", National Heritage List for England
- Historic England, "Cote How, Lakes (1271836)", National Heritage List for England
- Historic England, "Ash Tree Cottage, Lakes (1272217)", National Heritage List for England
- Historic England, "Blindtarn Gill, Lakes (1245188)", National Heritage List for England
- Historic England, "Gatehouse at Croft Hotel, Lakes (1245480)", National Heritage List for England
- Historic England, "Fell Foot and farm buildings at Fell Foot, Lakes (1245297)", National Heritage List for England
- Historic England, "High Broadrayn Cottage, Lakes (1245195)", National Heritage List for England
- Historic England, "Outbuilding to south of Low House, Lakes (1271820)", National Heritage List for England
- Historic England, "Rydal Hall, Lakes (1245499)", National Heritage List for England
- Historic England, "The Thrang and Thrang Barn, Lakes (1245199)", National Heritage List for England
- Historic England, "The Travellers Rest, Lakes (1271973)", National Heritage List for England
- Historic England, "Undermount, Lakes (1393595)", National Heritage List for England
- Historic England, "Underhelm Farmhouse, Lakes (1245191)", National Heritage List for England
- Historic England, "Wall End Farmhouse with Barns to south-east and north, Lakes (1271959)", National Heritage List for England
- Historic England, "Jesus Church, Lakes (1271827)", National Heritage List for England
- Historic England, "Brimmer Head Farmhouse with adjoining farm building, Lakes (1272005)", National Heritage List for England
- Historic England, "Eltermere Hotel, Lakes (1271958)", National Heritage List for England
- Historic England, "Rydal Mount, Lakes (1271835)", National Heritage List for England
- Historic England, "High Scorecrag Farmhouse with attached farm building, Lakes (1245268)", National Heritage List for England
- Historic England, "Low Scorecrag, Lakes (1245196)", National Heritage List for England
- Historic England, "Town End with attached outbuildings, Lakes (1271828)", National Heritage List for England
- Historic England, "Low House, Lakes (1271829)", National Heritage List for England
- Historic England, "Church Stile Cottage, Lakes (1245162)", National Heritage List for England
- Historic England, "Albert Moore's Barn, Lakes (1245582)", National Heritage List for England
- Historic England, "Bell Hill, Lakes (1271816)", National Heritage List for England
- Historic England, "Birk Howe Farmhouse, Lakes (1245286)", National Heritage List for England
- Historic England, "Blea Tarn House, Lakes (1245283)", National Heritage List for England
- Historic England, "Bridge End, Lakes (1271954)", National Heritage List for England
- Historic England, "Bridge Syke, Lakes (1245270)", National Heritage List for England
- Historic England, "Britannia Inn, Lakes (1245200)", National Heritage List for England
- Historic England, "Church Stile Studio. National Trust Information Centre, Lakes (1245160)", National Heritage List for England
- Historic England, "Crag Head, Lakes (1245401)", National Heritage List for England
- Historic England, "Dockray Cottage, Lakes (1245187)", National Heritage List for England
- Historic England, "Dove Cottage at Town End, Lakes (1272002)", National Heritage List for England
- Historic England, "Ghyll Foot, Lakes (1271974)", National Heritage List for England
- Historic England, "Glen Rothay Hotel, Lakes (1245404)", National Heritage List for England
- Historic England, "Goodybridge House and attached barn to north east, Lakes (1272006)", National Heritage List for England
- Historic England, "Hart Head, Lakes (1245503)", National Heritage List for England
- Historic England, "High Fold, Lakes (1271817)", National Heritage List for England
- Historic England, "High Green Farmhouse and attached buildings, Lakes (1271832)", National Heritage List for England
- Historic England, "Howe Top Farmhouse, Lakes (1245396)", National Heritage List for England
- Historic England, "Jaunie Wife House and attached barn to north west, Lakes (1376753)", National Heritage List for England
- Historic England, "Kitty Hall, Lakes (1245273)", National Heritage List for England
- Historic England, "Knott House Farmhouse with adjoining farm building to north, Lakes (1271950)", National Heritage List for England
- Historic England, "Lancrigg, Lakes (1245190)", National Heritage List for England
- Historic England, "Loughrigg Fold, Lakes (1245481)", National Heritage List for England
- Historic England, "Loughrigg How (house to north west), Lakes (1245402)", National Heritage List for England
- Historic England, "Loughrigg How (house to south east), Lakes (1245482)", National Heritage List for England
- Historic England, "Low Broadrayn Farmhouse and attached building to north, Lakes (1272003)", National Heritage List for England
- Historic England, "Lowfield with former cottage adjoining to north east, Lakes (1245146)", National Heritage List for England
- Historic England, "Low or South Fold, Lakes (1245510)", National Heritage List for England
- Historic England, "Barns etc to North of Low House, Lakes (1245508)", National Heritage List for England
- Historic England, "Mathew How, Lakes (1246648)", National Heritage List for England
- Historic England, "Middlefell Place Farmhouse and shippons attached to Middlefell Place Farmhouse, Lakes (1245276)", National Heritage List for England
- Historic England, "Millbeck Farmhouse with attached farm building, Lakes (1271943)", National Heritage List for England
- Historic England, "Mill Brow Farmhouse and Barns attached to Mill Brow Farmhouse, Lakes (1271826)", National Heritage List for England
- Historic England, "New Dungeon Ghyll Hotel, No. 1 Cottage, Lakes (1245278)", National Heritage List for England
- Historic England, "Oaks Farmhouse, Lakes (1245483)", National Heritage List for England
- Historic England, "Old School House and Barn attached to Old School House, Lakes (1244926)", National Heritage List for England
- Historic England, "Pye Howe, Lakes (1245280)", National Heritage List for England
- Historic England, "Queens Head Inn, Lakes (1271819)", National Heritage List for England
- Historic England, "Raw Head Farmhouse, Lakes (1245279)", National Heritage List for England
- Historic England, "Robin Lane Cottages, Lakes (1245507)", National Heritage List for England
- Historic England, "Robinson Place, Lakes (1271948)", National Heritage List for England
- Historic England, "Rock Cottage and Wayside, Lakes (1271874)", National Heritage List for England
- Historic England, "Rose Cottage and Wisteria Cottage, Lakes (1245271)", National Heritage List for England
- Historic England, "Rossett Farmhouse with attached barn, Lakes (1271960)", National Heritage List for England
- Historic England, "Scroggs, Lakes (1271875)", National Heritage List for England
- Historic England, "Side House Farmhouse, Lakes (1245277)", National Heritage List for England
- Historic England, "Slater's Bridge, Lakes (1245295)", National Heritage List for England
- Historic England, "Stool End Farmhouse, Barn to South East of Farmhouse and Barn to North East of Farmhouse, Lakes (1245281)", National Heritage List for England
- Historic England, "The Bield and Barn adjacent to The Bield, Lakes (1271944)", National Heritage List for England
- Historic England, "The Haven, Lakes (1244796)", National Heritage List for England
- Historic England, "The Mount, Lakes (1245502)", National Heritage List for England
- Historic England, "Thornthwaite, Town Head, Lakes (1245569)", National Heritage List for England
- Historic England, "Thrang Farmhouse with attached barn, Lakes (1271952)", National Heritage List for England
- Historic England, "Town Foot Farmhouse, Lakes (1245540)", National Heritage List for England
- Historic England, "Town Head Farmhouse, Lakes (1245253)", National Heritage List for England
- Historic England, "Underhelm Cottage, Town Head, Lakes (1272000)", National Heritage List for England
- Historic England, "Walthwaite and buildings attached to Walthwaite, Lakes (1245269)", National Heritage List for England
- Historic England, "Willy Goodwaller Bridge, Lakes (1245197)", National Heritage List for England
- Historic England, "Wilsons Place, Lakes (1245285)", National Heritage List for England
- Historic England, "Wood Farmhouse, Lakes (1245538)", National Heritage List for England
- Historic England, "Yew Tree Cottage, Lakes (1245514)", National Heritage List for England
- Historic England, "The Nook Cottage, Lakes (1245143)", National Heritage List for England
- Historic England, "Barn at Town End, Lakes (1245541)", National Heritage List for England
- Historic England, "Nos. 2 to 11 Church Street, Lakes (1245006)", National Heritage List for England
- Historic England, "Ashton Cottage, Little Beck and Raesbeck, Lakes (1245117)", National Heritage List for England
- Historic England, "High Sweden Bridge, Lakes (1244787)", National Heritage List for England
- Historic England, "Low Sweden Bridge, Lakes (1244786)", National Heritage List for England
- Historic England, "Nook End Farmhouse and attached farm building, Lakes (1244798)", National Heritage List for England
- Historic England, "Pavement End Farmhouse, Lakes (1245164)", National Heritage List for England
- Historic England, "Royal Oak Hotel, Lakes (1272218)", National Heritage List for England
- Historic England, "Barns, stables etc to north and east of Rydal Hall, Lakes (1245500)", National Heritage List for England
- Historic England, "Bridge over Rydal Beck in grounds of Rydal Hall, Lakes (1245408)", National Heritage List for England
- Historic England, "Summer house in grounds of Rydal Hall, Lakes (1271834)", National Heritage List for England
- Historic England, "The Toft, Lakes (1403725)", National Heritage List for England
- Historic England, "Golden Rule Hotel, Lakes (1245152)", National Heritage List for England
- Historic England, "Beckside, Lakes (1271818)", National Heritage List for England
- Historic England, "Town Head Cottage, Lakes (1245192)", National Heritage List for England
- Historic England, "Mortal Man Inn, Lakes (1245513)", National Heritage List for England
- Historic England, "Rectory, Lakes (1245159)", National Heritage List for England
- Historic England, "Buttments Farmhouse and Cottage attached to Buttments Farmhouse, Lakes (1245509)", National Heritage List for England
- Historic England, "Old Farm Cottage, Y H A Cottage and St Martin's, Lakes (1271953)", National Heritage List for England
- Historic England, "Robin Ghyll, Lakes (1245282)", National Heritage List for England
- Historic England, "Great House Barn, Lakes (1409301)", National Heritage List for England
- Historic England, "Elterwater Bridge, Lakes (1271955)", National Heritage List for England
- Historic England, "The Nab, Lakes (1271876)", National Heritage List for England
- Historic England, "Low Fold, Lakes (1245512)", National Heritage List for England
- Historic England, "Forest Side Cottage, Lakes (1271951)", National Heritage List for England
- Historic England, "Brow Head, Lakes (1245399)", National Heritage List for England
- Historic England, "Bridge House, Lakes (1245148)", National Heritage List for England
- Historic England, "Cross Brow, Lakes (1272010)", National Heritage List for England
- Historic England, "Gillside, Lakes (1245194)", National Heritage List for England
- Historic England, "Low Colwith with attached farm buildings, Lakes (1245284)", National Heritage List for England
- Historic England, "Moss Side, Lakes (1272016)", National Heritage List for England
- Historic England, "Pearson's Lane, Lakes (1245567)", National Heritage List for England
- Historic England, "Red Lion Hotel (old portion only), Lakes (1245163)", National Heritage List for England
- Historic England, "Rydal Lodge, Rydal Lodge Cottage and attached barn, Lakes (1245405)", National Heritage List for England
- Historic England, "Storeythwaite, Lakes (1271831)", National Heritage List for England
- Historic England, "The Old House, Lakes (1245171)", National Heritage List for England
- Historic England, "North Syke, Lakes (1272221)", National Heritage List for England
- Historic England, "Nos. 2 and 3 Bridge Street, Lakes (1272215)", National Heritage List for England
- Historic England, "No. 1 Cheapside, Lakes (1244792)", National Heritage List for England
- Historic England, "No. 2 Cheapside, Lakes (1244945)", National Heritage List for England
- Historic England, "Nos. 3 and 4 Cheapside, Lakes (1244793)", National Heritage List for England
- Historic England, "Nos. 1 to 4 Tom Fold, Lakes (1245153)", National Heritage List for England
- Historic England, "Premises occupied by Brown's Booking Office, Lakes (1272220)", National Heritage List for England
- Historic England, "Corbrig and Planetree House, Lakes (1245149)", National Heritage List for England
- Historic England, "Dale End with adjacent barn, Lakes (1271945)", National Heritage List for England
- Historic England, "Barn and stable attached to Forest Side Cottage, Lakes (1054624)", National Heritage List for England
- Historic England, "Fox Ghyll, Lakes (1245398)", National Heritage List for England
- Historic England, "Ghyll Side, Lakes (1244791)", National Heritage List for England
- Historic England, "High Fold Farmhouse with iron railings in front, Lakes (1271830)", National Heritage List for England
- Historic England, "High Green (house to the east), Lakes (1245568)", National Heritage List for England
- Historic England, "High Green (house to the north), Lakes (1271833)", National Heritage List for England
- Historic England, "Lane Foot Farm bank barn, attached possible smithy and cartshed and detached former wash house, Lakes (1416818)", National Heritage List for England
- Historic England, "Loughrigg Cottage, Lakes (1245397)", National Heritage List for England
- Historic England, "Loughrigg Holme with attached building to south, Lakes (1271872)", National Heritage List for England
- Historic England, "Low Wood Hotel, Lakes (1272015)", National Heritage List for England
- Historic England, "Old Mill studios, Lakes (1244789)", National Heritage List for England
- Historic England, "Rosebank Barn, Lakes (1417647)", National Heritage List for England
- Historic England, "Stock Cottage, Lakes (1245144)", National Heritage List for England
- Historic England, "Premises occupied by Stoneage, The Priest Hole Restaurant, Oxfam, Lakes (1244794)", National Heritage List for England
- Historic England, "Syke Barn, Lakes (1456487)", National Heritage List for England
- Historic England, "Thorney Howe Youth Hostel, Lakes (1245189)", National Heritage List for England
- Historic England, "Three Shires Inn, Lakes (1245294)", National Heritage List for England
- Historic England, "Arbour in garden at Dove Nest, Lakes (1245155)", National Heritage List for England
- Historic England, "Hall Bank, Lakes (1254495)", National Heritage List for England
- Historic England, "Wateredge Hotel, Lakes (1272219)", National Heritage List for England
- Historic England, "Dove Nest, Lakes (1245154)", National Heritage List for England
- Historic England, "Calgarth Park, Lakes (1245505)", National Heritage List for England
- Historic England, "Scale How (part of Charlotte Mason College), Lakes (1244797)", National Heritage List for England
- Historic England, "Croft Hotel, Lakes (1271856)", National Heritage List for England
- Historic England, "Allan Bank, Lakes (1272018)", National Heritage List for England
- Historic England, "St Anne's Court, Lakes (1313425)", National Heritage List for England
- Historic England, "Boundary stone on site of Three Shire Stones, Lakes (1311547)", National Heritage List for England
- Historic England, "Church of St Mary, Lakes (1245403)", National Heritage List for England
- Historic England, "Rothay Manor Hotel, Lakes (1272011)", National Heritage List for England
- Historic England, "Mill Cottage. Mill Stream, Lakes (1272012)", National Heritage List for England
- Historic England, "Premises occupied by Bowness, Lakes (1245272)", National Heritage List for England
- Historic England, "St Oswald's, Lakes (1272017)", National Heritage List for England
- Historic England, "The Wray, Lakes (1245186)", National Heritage List for England
- Historic England, "Fox How, Lakes (1271870)", National Heritage List for England
- Historic England, "Town End Boathouse, Lakes (1271460)", National Heritage List for England
- Historic England, "The Knoll, Lakes (1272013)", National Heritage List for England
- Historic England, "Wansfell Holme, Lakes (1272007)", National Heritage List for England
- Historic England, "Barn to west of Low or South Fold Farmhouse, Lakes (1245511)", National Heritage List for England
- Historic England, "Old Stamp House, Lakes (1245110)", National Heritage List for England
- Historic England, "Church of St Mary, Lakes (1244784)", National Heritage List for England
- Historic England, "Church of the Holy Trinity, Lakes (1245198)", National Heritage List for England
- Historic England, "Loughrigg Brow, Lakes (1245455)", National Heritage List for England
- Historic England, "Market Hall (occupied by Mountain Restaurant and offices), Lakes (1245141)", National Heritage List for England
- Historic England, "Langdale Chase Hotel, Lakes (1245506)", National Heritage List for England
- Historic England, "Thickholme Bridge (Thirlmere Aqueduct), Lakes (1332570)", National Heritage List for England
- Historic England, "Langdale War Memorial, Lakes (1457094)", National Heritage List for England
- Historic England, "Grasmere War Memorial, Lakes (1441481)", National Heritage List for England
- Historic England, "AA Telephone Call Box No 487, Lakes (1367182)", National Heritage List for England
- Historic England, "No. 4 Bridge Street, Lakes (1244790)", National Heritage List for England
- Historic England, "Nos. 5 and 6 Bridge Street, Lakes (1272216)", National Heritage List for England
- Historic England, "Nos. 1 to 6 Main Street, Lakes (1245274)", National Heritage List for England
- Historic England, "Nos. 1 to 7 Mill Street, Lakes (1245275)", National Heritage List for England
- Historic England, "Nos. 1 to 3 Smithy Brow, Lakes (1272009)", National Heritage List for England
- Historic England, "Becksteps, Lakes (1245201)", National Heritage List for England
- Historic England, "Church Cottage, Lakes (1245406)", National Heritage List for England
- Historic England, "Barn at rear of Church Stile Studio, Lakes (1245161)", National Heritage List for England
- Historic England, "Cobbled courtyard with mounting block and pump, Croft Courtyard and Croft Lodge, Lakes (1271873)", National Heritage List for England
- Historic England, "Fir Bank Quarrymen's Cottages, Lakes (1271957)", National Heritage List for England
- Historic England, "Friends' Meeting House (including chiropody surgery), Lakes (1245150)", National Heritage List for England
- Historic England, "Barn to south west of Gillside, Lakes (1245257)", National Heritage List for England
- Historic England, "Bridge beside St Oswald's Church, Lakes (1245158)", National Heritage List for England
- Historic England, "Greenend, Lakes (1271956)", National Heritage List for England
- Historic England, "High Colwith, Lakes (1245293)", National Heritage List for England
- Historic England, "Barn to east of Howe Top Farmhouse, Lakes (1271871)", National Heritage List for England
- Historic England, "Howsley Cottage, Lakes (1245400)", National Heritage List for England
- Historic England, "Kirkstone Foot Cottage, Cottage adjoining Kirkstone Foot Cottage, and Springwell Cottage, Lakes (1245172)", National Heritage List for England
- Historic England, "Cross in front of the Salutation Inn, Lakes (1245151)", National Heritage List for England
- Historic England, "Miller Bridge, Lakes (1244788)", National Heritage List for England
- Historic England, "North View, Lakes (1272014)", National Heritage List for England
- Historic England, "Pelter Bridge, Lakes (1245484)", National Heritage List for England
- Historic England, "Premises occupied by Tyson, Lakes (1245140)", National Heritage List for England
- Historic England, "Barn and cottage belonging to the Red Lion to south of the hotel, Lakes (1245185)", National Heritage List for England
- Historic England, "Rothay Bridge, Lakes (1245147)", National Heritage List for England
- Historic England, "Rydal Cottages, Lakes (1245498)", National Heritage List for England
- Historic England, "Game Larder in grounds of Rydal Hall, Lakes (1245409)", National Heritage List for England
- Historic England, "Ice-house in grounds of Rydal Hall, Lakes (1245501)", National Heritage List for England
- Historic England, "Terraces to south of Rydal Hall, Lakes (1245407)", National Heritage List for England
- Historic England, "Skelwith Bridge, Lakes (1245504)", National Heritage List for England
- Historic England, "Swan Hotel, Lakes (1272004)", National Heritage List for England
- Historic England, "The Cottage, Fairview Cottage, and Nos. 3 to 6 Fair View Road, Lakes (1244795)", National Heritage List for England
- Historic England, "Barn to north of Underhelm Farmhouse, Lakes (1272001)", National Heritage List for England
- Historic England, "Wordsworth group of graves in churchyard of Church of St Oswald, Lakes (1272008)", National Heritage List for England
- Historic England, "Wordsworth Museum, Town End, Lakes (1245193)", National Heritage List for England
- Historic England, Listed Buildings
- Hyde, Matthew; Pevsner, Nikolaus (2010) [1967], Cumbria, The Buildings of England, New Haven and London: Yale University Press, ISBN 978-0-300-12663-1
