= Fox Ghyll =

Hotel in Ambleside, Cumbria, England

Coordinates: 54.4375°N 2.9833°W

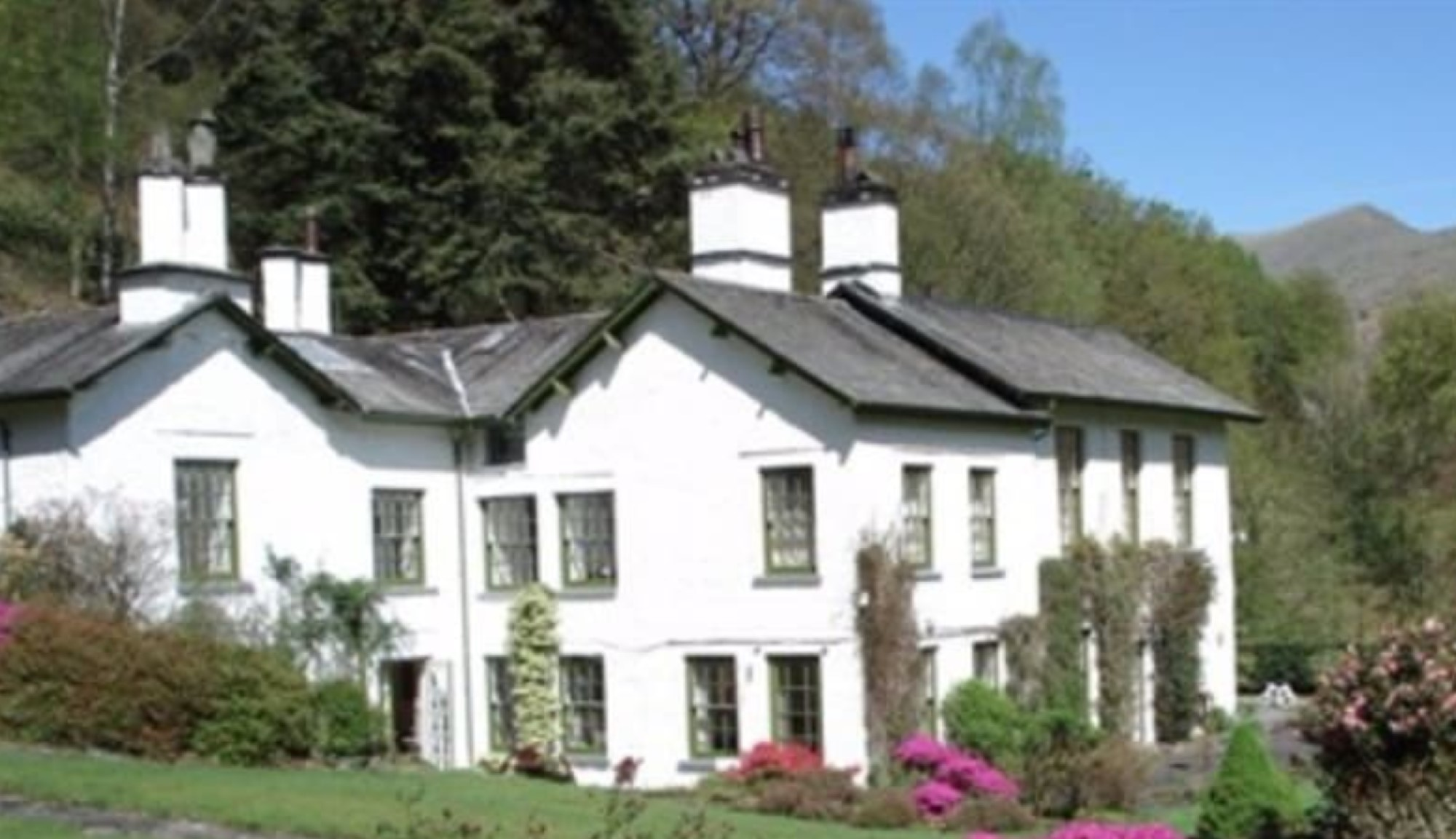
Fox Ghyll in 2020

Fox Ghyll or Foxghyll, earlier Fox Gill, is a historic house near Ambleside in Cumbria, England, and is a Grade II listed building. It is a Regency building which seems to have been added to a much older house that was on the site. It was the home of many notable people including Thomas De Quincey over the next two centuries.

== Early residents ==
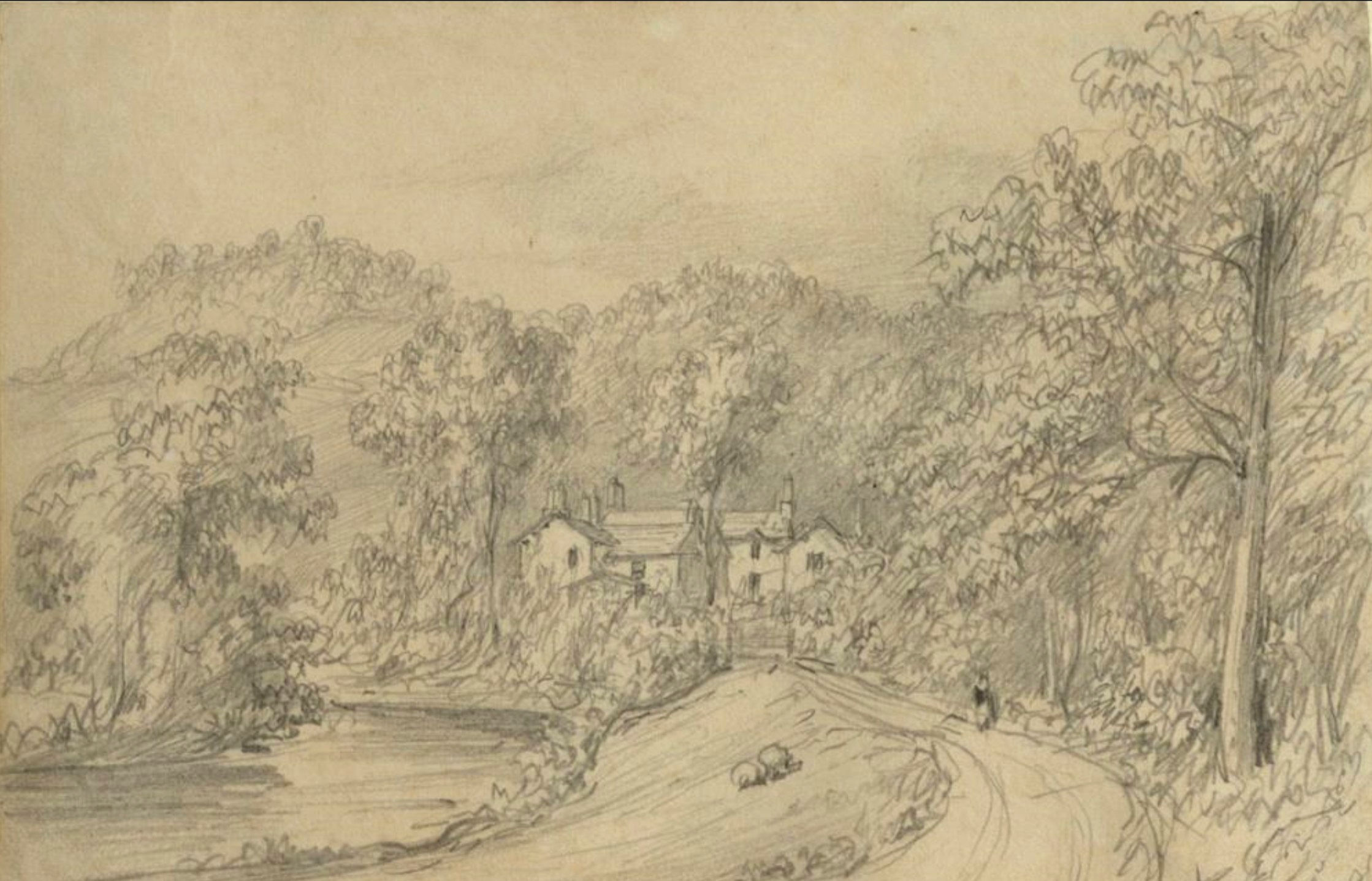
Sketch of Fox Ghyll by Dora Wordsworth in 1831

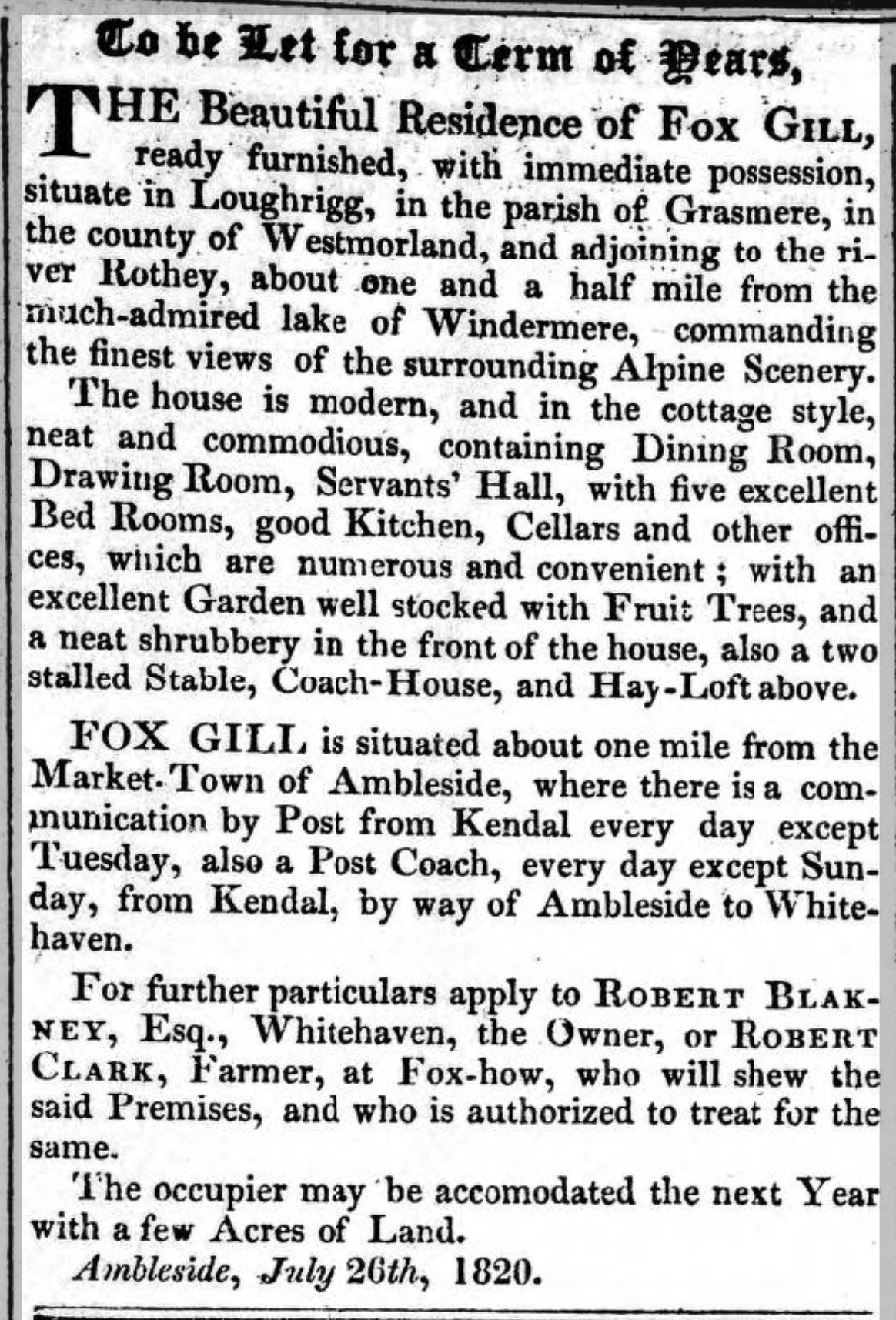
Rental notice for Fox Gill in 1820

Robert Blakeney (1758-1822) appears to have made substantial alterations and additions in the early 1800s to an existing much older house which was on the site. At this time the house was called Fox Gill. Robert was a friend of William Wordsworth who lived in the nearby house Rydal Mount and in 1814 Wordsworth wrote to him mentioning the windows in the house he was building. Robert was a wealthy property owner who came from Whitehaven. He was the son of Captain George Augustus Blakeney and in 1780 married Elizabeth Burrows. His second wife was Margaret Edwards who he married in 1814. In 1820 he decided to rent the house and he placed an advertisement in The Westmorland Gazette which is shown.

The person who responded to the advertisement was Thomas De Quincey, a struggling writer who was briefly editor of The Westmorland Gazette. He rented the house for his growing family from 1820 until 1825. It has been claimed that it was at Fox Ghyll that he wrote “Confessions of an English Opium-Eater” which appeared anonymously in 1821. However, it is generally agreed that he finished this autobiographical work during a stay in Tavistock Street in London.

In 1825, Mrs Letitia Luff, a friend of William Wordsworth and his family bought Fox Ghyll. She was the widow of Charles Luff, an old resident of Patterdale, who had died in Mauritius in 1815. The Wordsworths made many visits to her at the house and in 1831 Dora Wordsworth, who was the daughter of William made a sketch of Fox Ghyll which is shown.

The tithe map of Rydal shows that by 1838, Hornby Roughsedge (1782-1859) was the owner and occupier of Fox Ghyll. He was a wealthy landowner from Bentham and became a magistrate for Westmorland. He and his wife Margaret Hodgson (1793-1867) lived in the house until Hornby’s death in 1859. Their daughter Elizabeth also lived with them until her marriage in 1841.

== Later residents ==
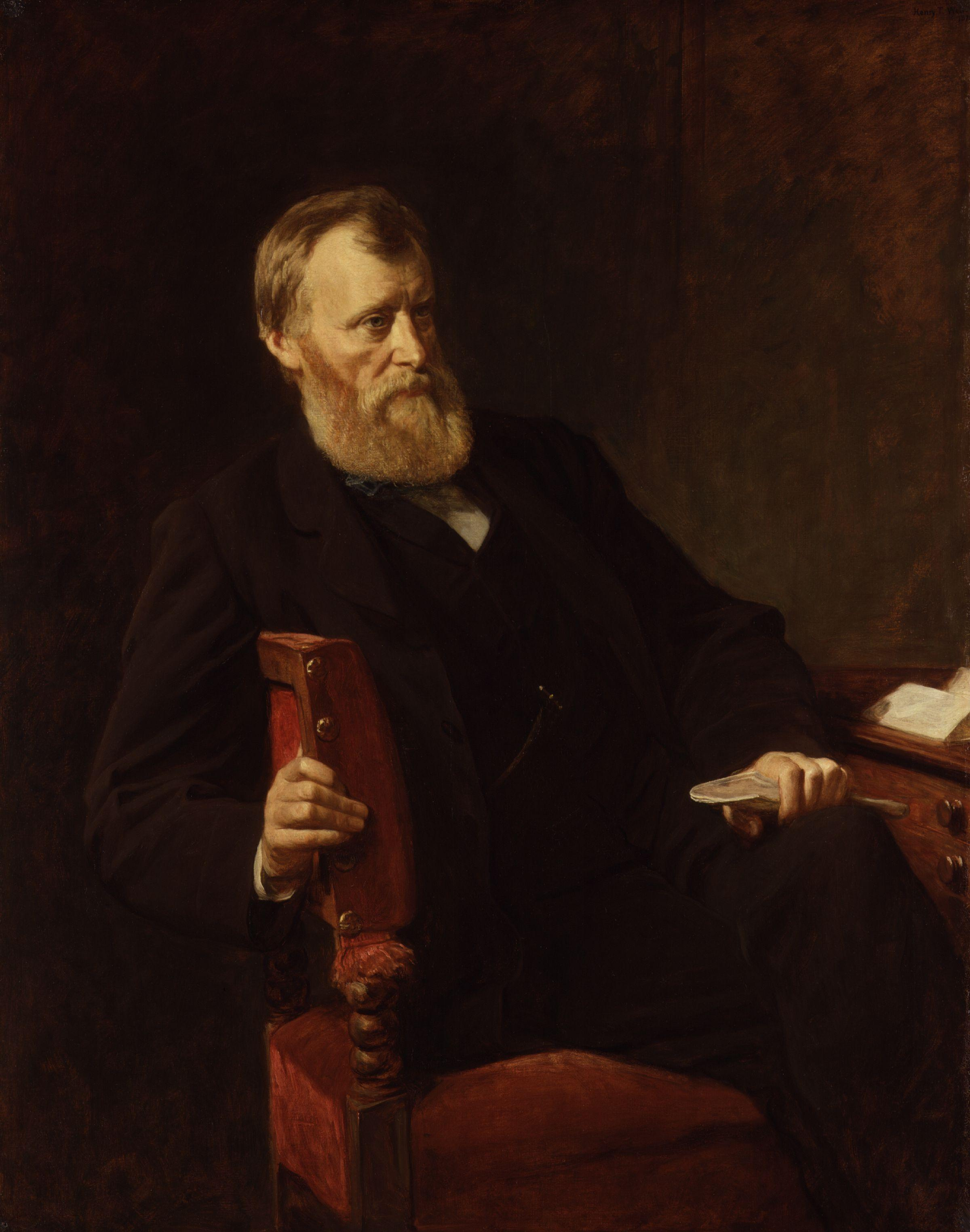
William Edward Forster

After Hornby died in 1859, the house was let for some time and in about 1870 it was bought by William Edward Forster (1818-1886) who made major additions to the building. He was a notable politician who introduced an important Education Act. He was born in 1818 at Bradpole in Dorset. His father was William Forster who was famous for his work in abolishing slavery and his mother was Anna Buxton, a friend of Elizabeth Fry.

In 1850, he married Jane Arnold who was the daughter of Thomas Arnold, an educator and historian who lived at Fox How which is near Fox Ghyll. She was also the sister of Matthew Arnold the famous poet who inherited the neighbouring Fox How house. William and Jane had no children of their own but adopted four children of Jane's brother William Arnold after he died in 1859. Two of them later became famous. Hugh Arnold Forster who was a politician and writer and Florence Arnold Forster who wrote a diary in which she mentions Fox Ghyll.

Forster's biographer Thomas Wemyss Reid describes the love that Forster had for Fox Ghyll. He said:

This happy nook, between lake and hill, became his place of refuge and recreation whenever the labours and anxieties of public life weighed too heavily upon him. It was not solitude, however, which he sought at Fox Ghyll. Throughout his life he had delighted in the society of those dear to him, and in his country home it was his chief pleasure to share with his family the enjoyment of the beautiful scenery which lay within easy reach of his door. No other spot on earth could ever replace Wharfeside, the home of his manhood and married life, and the scene of his first great struggles and successes, in his affections; yet, from 1873 onwards, it was to Fox Ghyll that he naturally turned for relief and sunshine, and the mountains and lakes of Westmoreland became almost as dear to him as the familiar hills of Yorkshire and the busy valleys around Bradford.

William died in 1886 and left all of his property to his wife Jane. She owned the house until her death in 1899 and it was then sold to the Elletson sisters.

Emily and Margaret Elletson were maiden ladies who had inherited property in Pilling. They were the daughters of Daniel Elletson (1806-1856) of Parrox Hall, Preesall. The sisters are listed in both the 1901 and 1911 Census as living at Fox Ghyll with three servants. Margaret died in 1921 and Emily in 1928.

In 1939, Gladys Mary Barber (1888-1947), a widow bought Fox Ghyll. She lived there until her death in 1947. From 1958 until 1965 James Peter Blackledge lived at the house and then moved to Cote How in Ambleside.

Since 1979, Fox Ghyll has been owned by the Mann family. In 1988, the 7th Earl of Lonsdale deeded the manorial rights to the Mann Family. This included the title of Lord and Lady of the Manor of Loughrigg

As of 2022, Fox Ghyll is a residence which provides bed and breakfast accommodation under the name Foxghyll (or FoxGhyll) Country House.

== See also ==
- Listed buildings in Lakes, Cumbria
