= St Mary's Church, Rydal =

Coordinates: 54.44734°N 2.98174°W

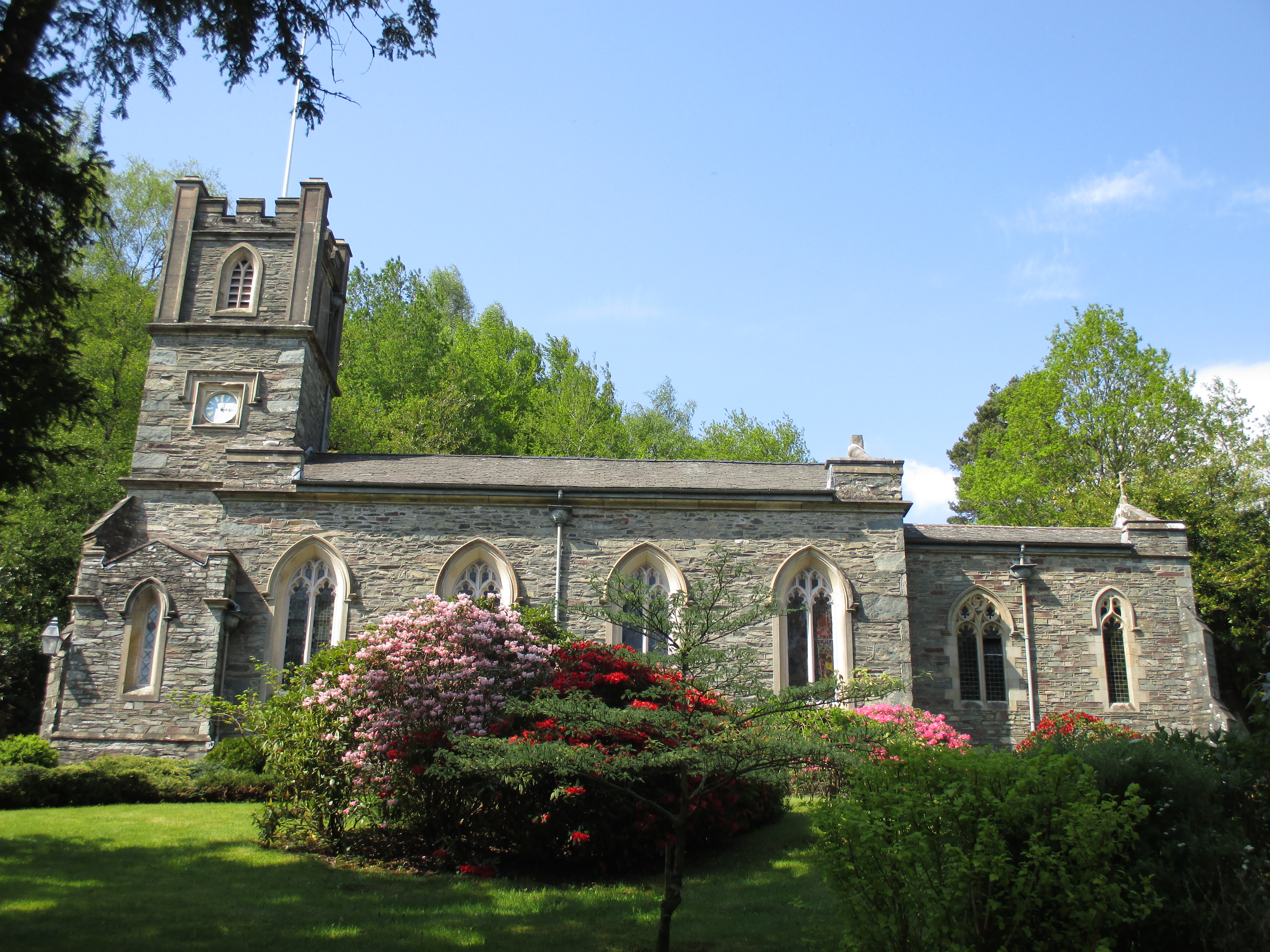
- St Mary's Church, Rydal

- Location in Cumbria
- OS grid reference: NY 364 062
- Location: Rydal, Cumbria
- Country: England
- Denomination: Anglican
- Website: St Mary's Rydal

History
- Status: Parish church

Architecture
- Functional status: Active
- Heritage designation: Grade II*
- Designated: 12 January 1967
- Architectural type: Church

Administration
- Province: York
- Diocese: Carlisle
- Archdeaconry: Westmorland and Furness
- Deanery: Windermere
- Parish: Rydal

Clergy
- Vicar: Revd David Wilmot

St Mary's Church is in the village of Rydal in the Lake District, Cumbria, England. It is an active Anglican parish church in the deanery of Windermere, the archdeaconry of Westmorland and Furness, and the diocese of Carlisle. The church, built in the Gothic revival style, is situated off the A591 road between Ambleside and Grasmere and is recorded in the National Heritage List for England as a designated Grade II* listed building.

== History ==
The church was built by Lady le Fleming of Rydal Hall, at a cost of £1,500. The foundation stone was laid in 1823 with the chapel opened in 1824, and consecrated in 1825. The architect was George Webster. Poet William Wordsworth helped to choose the site, which was originally an orchard.

== See also ==
- Rydal, Cumbria
- Listed buildings in Lakes, Cumbria
