= St Oswald's Church, Grasmere =

Coordinates: 54.4575°N 3.0237°W

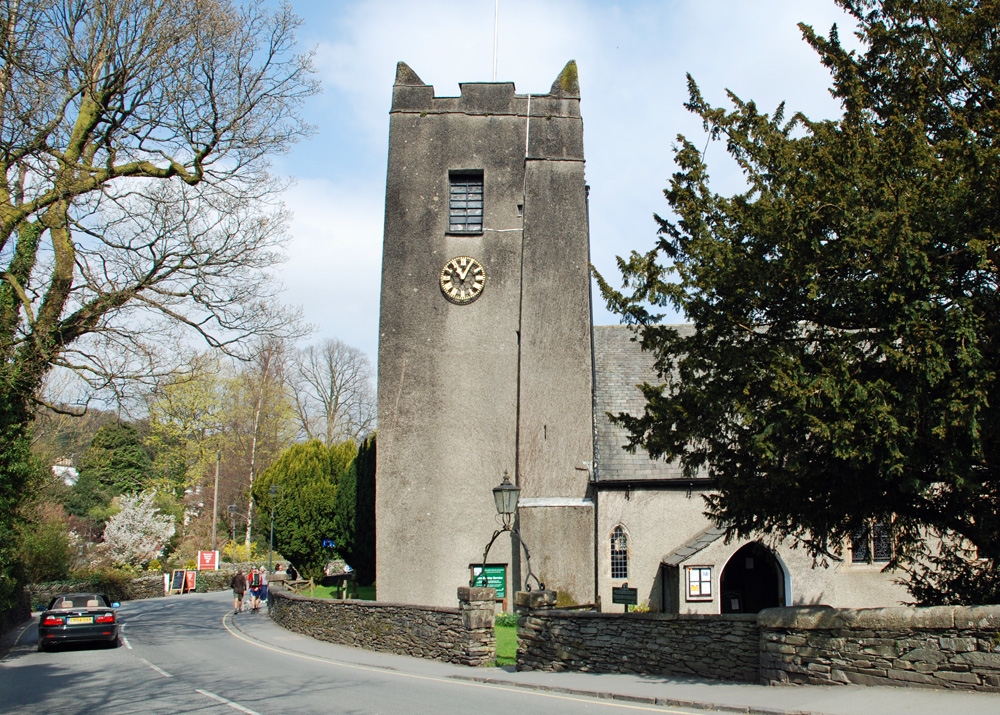
- St Oswald's Church, Grasmere, from the south.

- Location in Cumbria
- OS grid reference: NY 337 074
- Location: Grasmere, Cumbria
- Country: England
- Denomination: Anglican
- Website: https://www.achurchnearyou.com/church/12407/

History
- Status: Parish church
- Dedication: Saint Oswald

Architecture
- Functional status: Active
- Heritage designation: Grade I
- Designated: 21 January 1967
- Architectural type: Church
- Style: Gothic

Specifications
- Materials: Roughcast stone, slate roofs

Administration
- Province: York
- Diocese: Carlisle
- Archdeaconry: Westmorland and Furness
- Deanery: Windermere
- Parish: Grasmere

Clergy
- Rector: Rev Lawrence Basham

St Oswald's Church is an active Anglican parish church in the village of Grasmere, in the Lake District, Cumbria, England. It is recorded in the National Heritage List for England as a designated Grade I listed building and is notable for associations with the poet William Wordsworth and his family, and for its annual ceremony of rushbearing. The church is in the deanery of Windermere, the archdeaconry of Westmorland and Furness, and the diocese of Carlisle.

== History ==
The church is dedicated to the 7th-century saint Oswald of Northumbria, King of Northumbria. It is said to have been built on a site visited by Oswald. The present building dates from the 14th century, and was doubled in size by the addition of a parallel nave to the north of the original nave between 1490 and 1500. The roof was rebuilt in about 1562, which involved adding a second tier of arches to the arcade. The windows and doors were restored in 1840 by George Webster.

== Architecture ==
St Oswald's is constructed in roughcast stone with slate roofs. Its plan consists of a double nave, with a south porch and a southeast tower. The tower is battered (its walls incline inwards as the tower rises), it has lancet windows, and plain corner pinnacles.

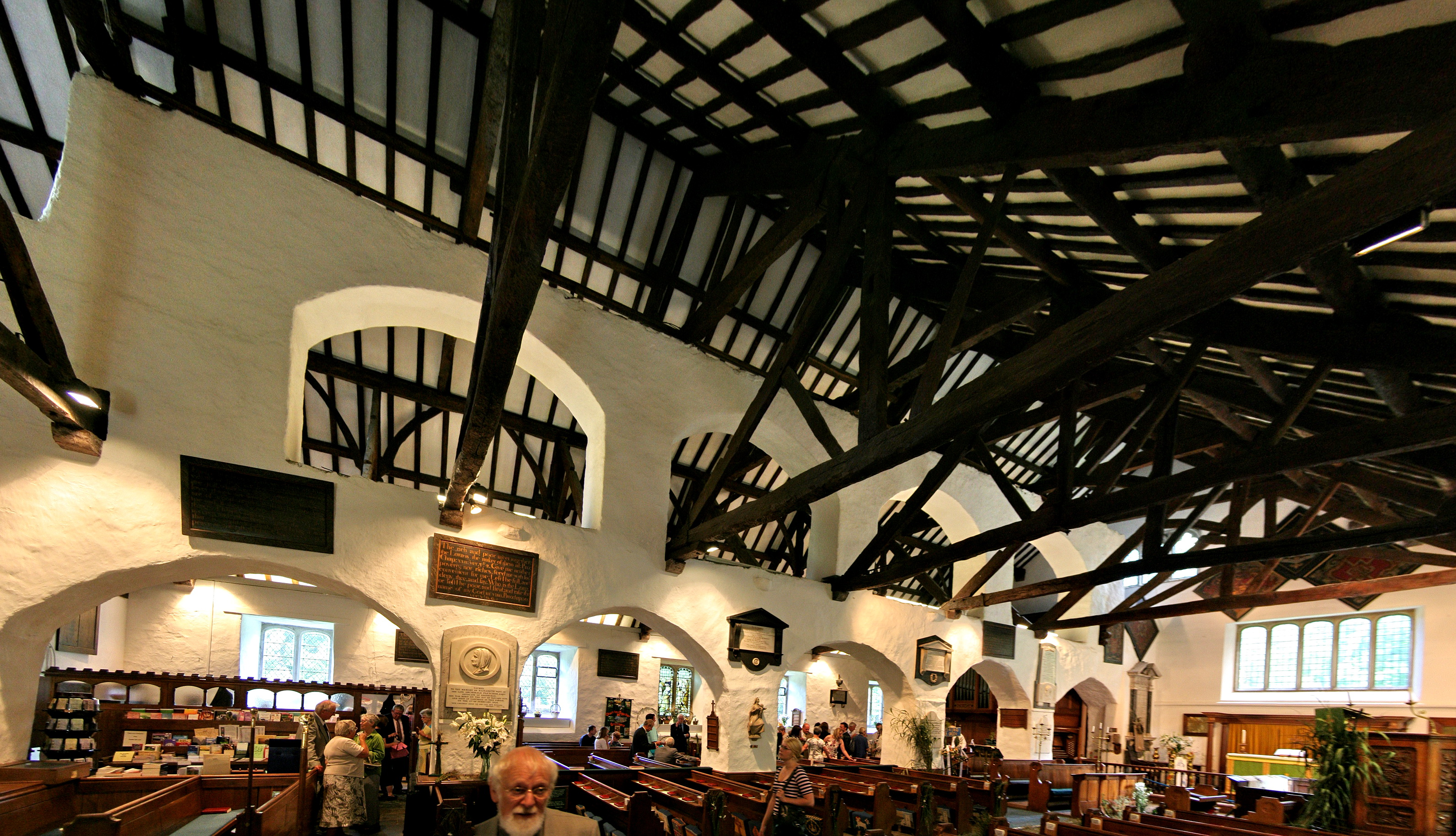
Interior showing the two tiers of arches and the remarkable roof beams

Inside the church, the arcade has five arches rising from ground level, and four arches above. The arcade does not reach the ridge of the roof, but ends in the upper tie beams of the open timber roof. In the church is a poor box dated 1648, and a balustered altar rail of 1725. The pulpit is in Arts and Craft style, and carved with fruits and flowers. The font is medieval, and consists of an octagonal bowl on a stepped base. The stained glass includes a window on the north side of the church from about 1926 by Shrigley and Hunt, and two windows on the south side from the 1890s by Henry Holiday. There is medieval glass in windows on the south side of the chancel.

== Monuments ==
William Wordsworth lived in Grasmere from 1799, and was buried in the churchyard of St Oswald's. Inside the church, the monuments include one to Wordsworth by Thomas Woolner, with an epitaph by John Keble. There is also a wall tablet in the chancel in Doric style to the antiquary Daniel Fleming who died in 1701.

The church has a sculpture of the Madonna and child by Ophelia Gordon Bell, who lived and worked in Grasmere.

== Organ ==
In the 1870s the church acquired an organ by Wilkinson of Kendal. The instrument was moved to Lancaster after the present organ by Binns of Leeds, was installed in 1923, and is now in Boltongate.

The Binns instrument was commissioned as a memorial to nurse Nellie Taylor who died in France during the First World War. The organ was rebuilt in the 1960s by J.W. Walker & Sons. Nicholson & Co Ltd renovated it to celebrate its centenary; the inaugural recital was given in 2023 by James Lancelot.

== Churchyard ==
=== Wordsworth graves ===
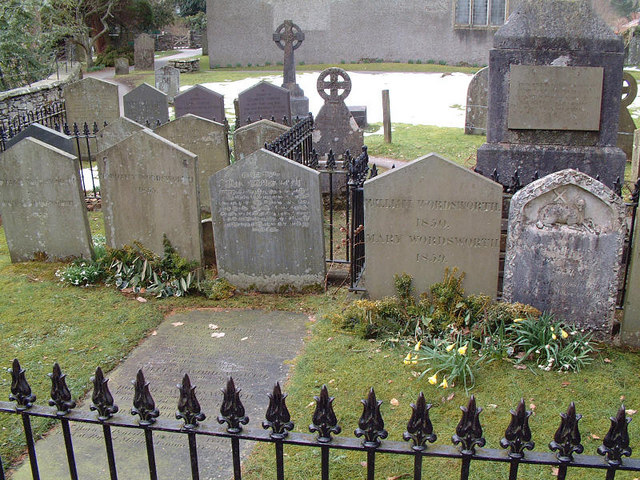
Wordsworth graves

In the southeast corner of the churchyard is a group of twelve graves surrounded by railings. These are the graves of members of the Wordsworth and Quillinan families, and are listed at Grade II*.

== See also ==
- Grade I listed churches in Cumbria
- Listed buildings in Lakes, Cumbria
