= Scandale Beck =

River in Cumbria, England

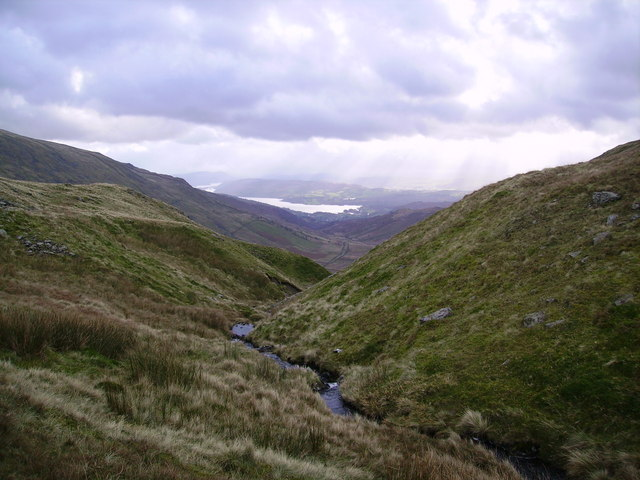
- Scandale Beck, high up the beck near its source at Bakestones Moss, with Windermere to the south.

Location
- Country: England
- County: Cumbria

Physical characteristics
- Source: Bakestones Moss
  - location: west of Kirkstone Pass, Cumbria, Lake District National Park, Cumbria, England
  - coordinates: 54°28′57″N 2°57′12″W
  - elevation: 300 m (980 ft)
- Mouth: River Rothay
  - location: near Ambleside, Lake District National Park, Cumbria, England
  - coordinates: 54°25′56″N 2°58′17″W
  - elevation: 180 m (590 ft)
- Length: 6.5 km (4.0 mi)
- Discharge
  - location: River Rothay

Scandale Beck arises in Lake District National Park, in England, on Bakestones Moss, west of Kirkstone Pass, Cumbria, and flows south for much of its length of six and a half kilometers.

It flows under High Sweden Bridge, a 17th-century packhorse bridge, past High Sweden Coppice and Low Sweden Coppice, before turning west for a short distance north of Papermill Coppice, and turning south to join the River Rothay east of Ambleside. The Rothay flows only a short distance south before emptying into Windermere, the largest natural lake in England.

== High head hydroelectric proposal ==
In August 2011, Ellergreen Hydro Ltd proposed a 900 kW high head hydroelectric scheme for Scandale Beck. Despite opposition for some quarters, for example, the Angling Trust, planning permission for the development was granted in April 2012.

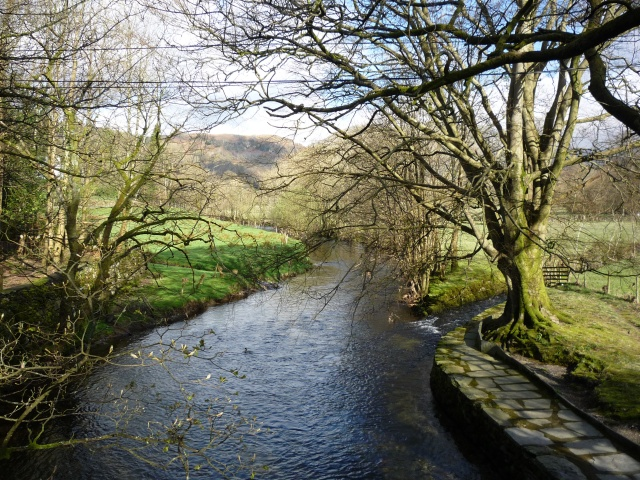
Looking upstream on the River Rothay. On the right is the mouth of Scandale Beck, flowing off the Scandale fells.
