= The Samling Hotel =

English Heritage property

Coordinates: 54.41466°N 2.95076°W

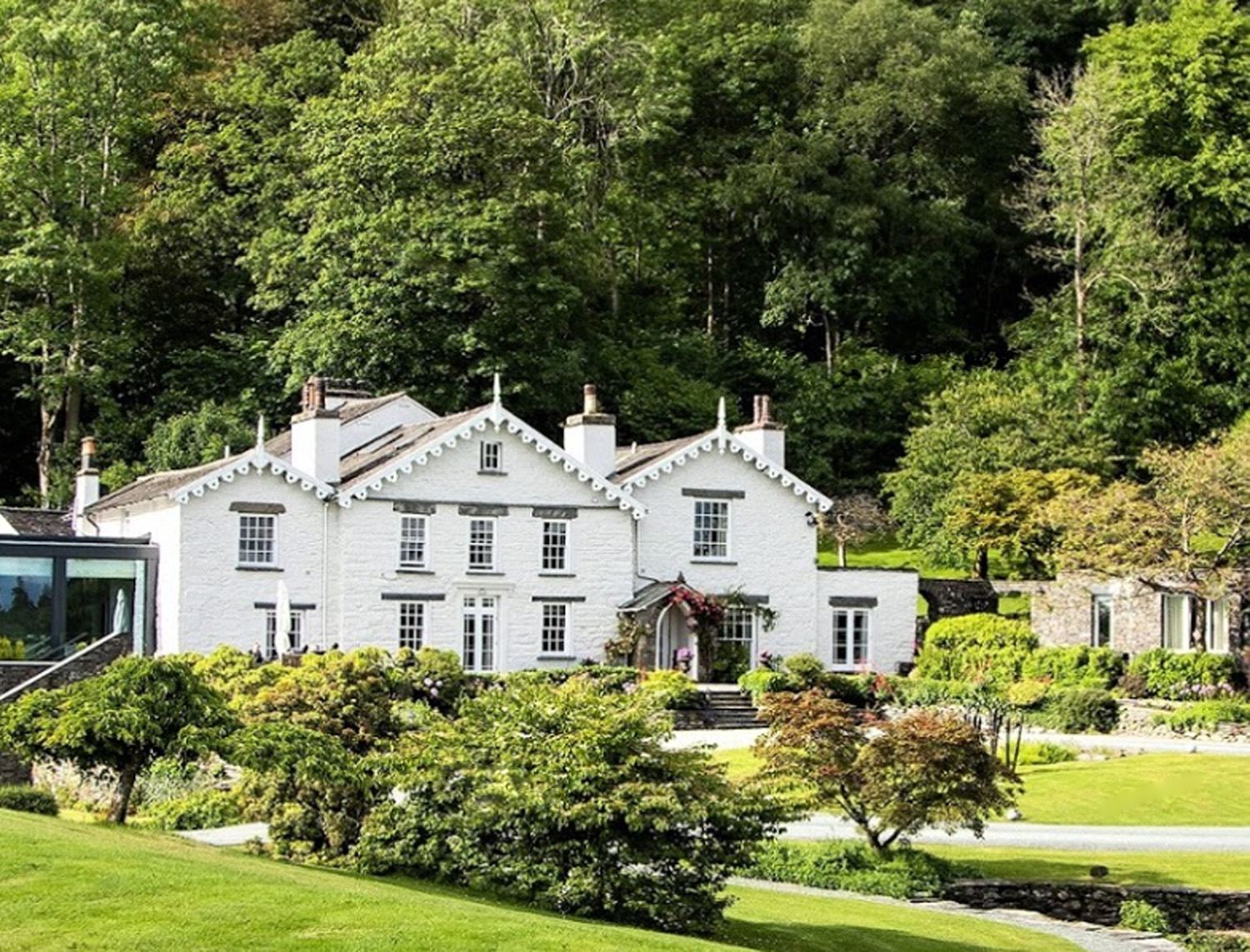
The Samling Hotel

The Samling Hotel (previously known as Dove Nest) is a historic building near Ambleside in the Lake District of England. It is a Grade II listed building. It was built as a villa in about 1780 by John Benson who was the landlord of William Wordsworth. It was the home of several famous tenants over the next century and became a tourist attraction, being described in the Guide Books of the Lake District. The ownership of the house remained with the Benson family until about 1960. Today it is a hotel which has accommodation and dining facilities.

== The Benson family and their tenants ==
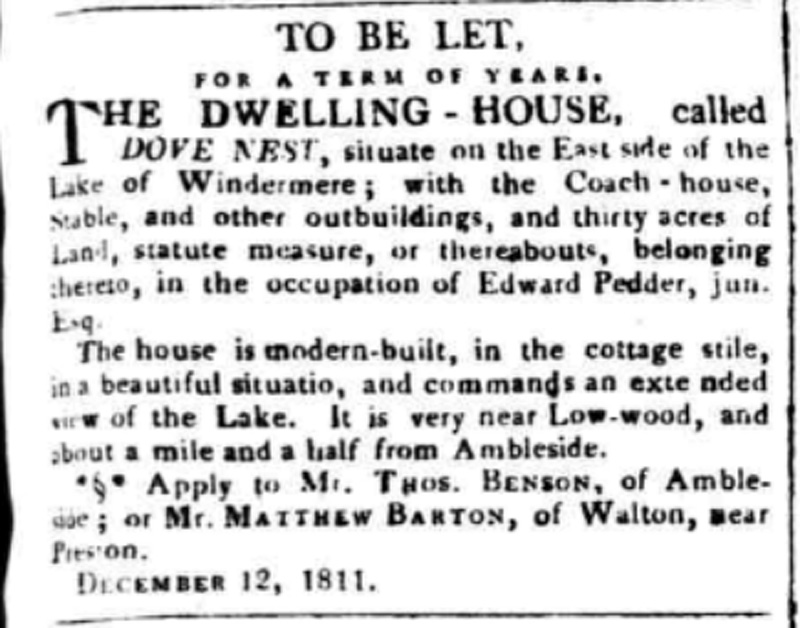
Rental notice for Dove's Nest in 1811

John Benson (1745–1808), who built and lived in the house from about 1780 was a wealthy landowner whose family had been in the Windermere district from the 15th Century. He owned many properties in the area including William Wordsworth’s house “Dove Cottage”. Wordsworth visited him at Dove’s Nest to pay the rent. In 1767 Benson married Agnes Jackson (1747–1828), whose family also came from the Windermere area. She was the sister of William Jackson (1748-1809) who owned Greta Hall in Keswick and was the well documented landlord of the famous poet Robert Southey.

Benson died in 1808 and left Dove’s Nest to his wife Agnes and she decided to rent it to wealthy tenants. William Green, who in 1819 wrote “The Tourists New Guide”, said:

"Dove Nest the property of Mrs. Benson is inhabited by Messrs Tupper. After the Demise of the late Mr Benson it was successively inhabited by Sir Frederick Morshead, Bart, Edward Pedder Esq. Mr Ainsworth, and lastly by Thomas Woodville Esq now of Yewdale Grove. Dove Nest was greatly improved by Mr Pedder. It is a delightful place and the house commands a very interesting view down Windermere."

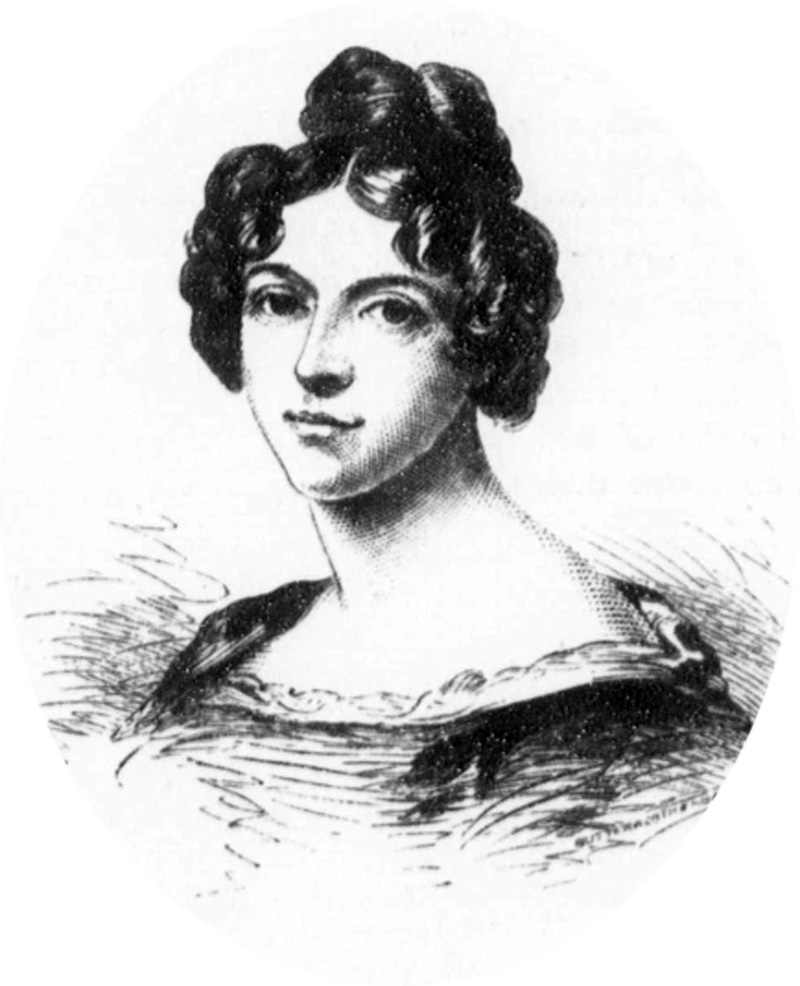
Felicia Hemans

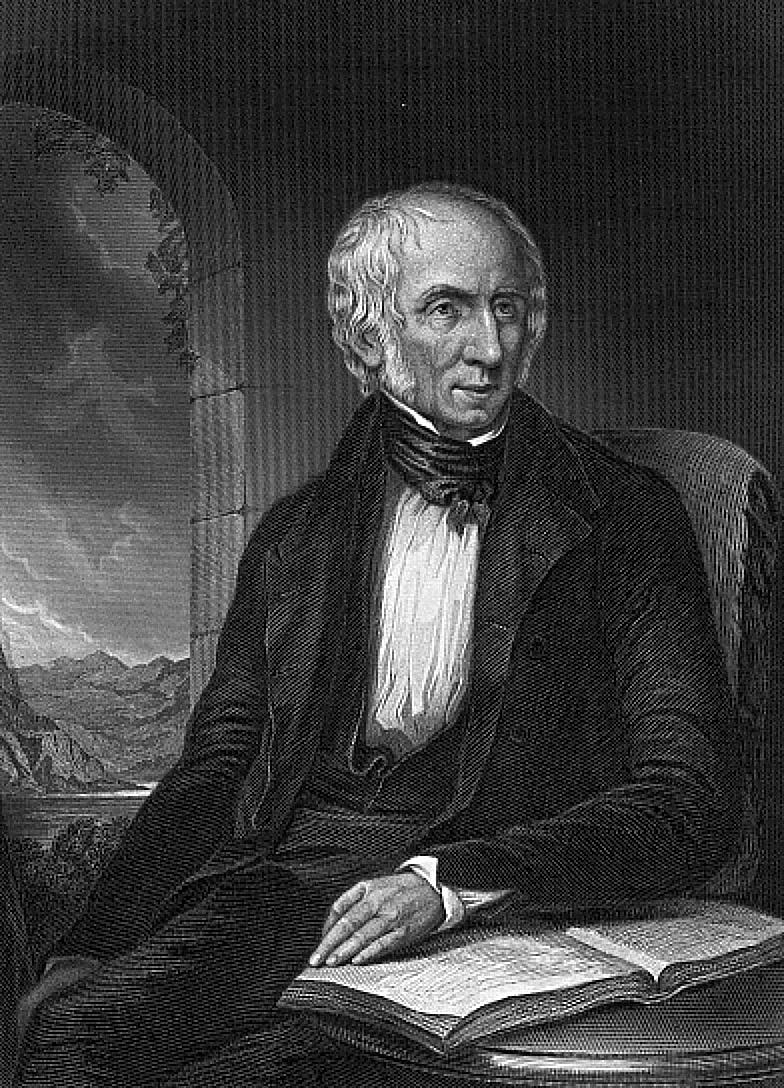
William Wordsworth

Edward Pedder rented the house from about 1809 until 1812 and during this time he employed a governess called Ellen Weeton. She wrote a journal about her life which was first published in 1936 as “Miss Weeton: Journal of a Governess”. It has been recently published again called “Miss Weeton: Governess and Traveller”. In the book is an account of her time with the Pedder family at Dove’s Nest.

After Agnes Benson died in about 1828, her son Thomas Benson (1783–1869) inherited the house. He also rented it to tenants, one of whom was Felicia Hemans a very famous poet of her time and personal friend of William Wordsworth. She lived there in the summer of 1830 with some of her family and was enchanted with the place.

At Dove’s Nest she had frequent visits from William Wordsworth. One of her friends, Samuel Carter Hall, wrote in his memoirs about this time. He said.

"For some time she resided in Westmorland. Not far from the shores of Windermere is “Dove’s Nest” still a pretty yet unpretending cottage. Here she had the frequent companionship of the poet she most honoured and loved; and Wordsworth in return for sweet companionship gave her the wealth of his friendship and accorded to her perhaps greater homage than he paid to any other of his contemporaries."

She described these visits herself. She said.

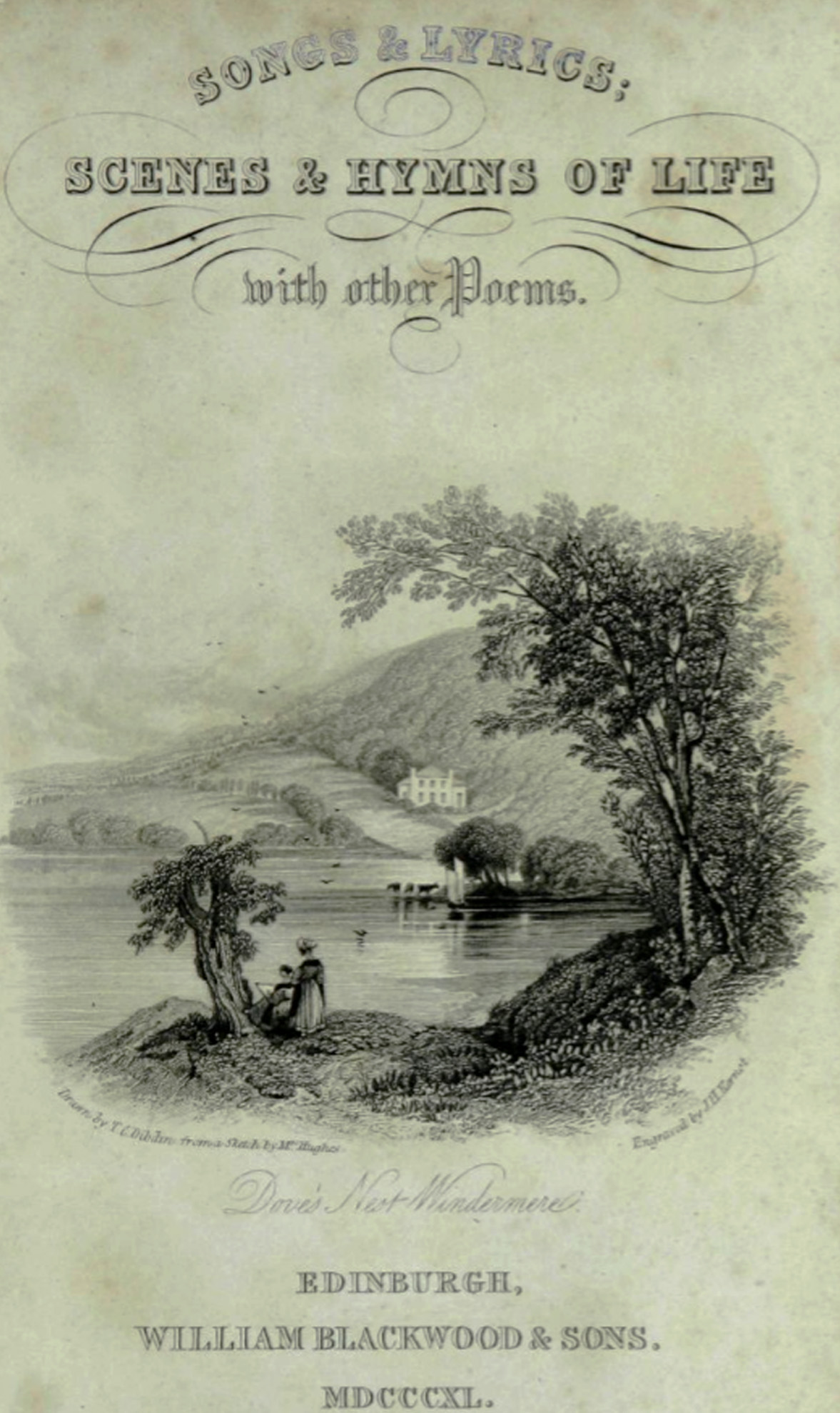
Title page of one of Felicia Heman's books with an engraving of Dove's Nest

"The ground is laid out in rather an antiquated style which now that nature is beginning to reclaim it from art, I do not at all dislike. There is a little grassy terrace immediately under the window descending to a small court with a circular grass plot in which grows one tall white rose tree…I am writing to you from an old fashioned alcove in the little garden round which the sweetbriar and moss rose tree have completely run wild; and I look down from it upon lovely Windermere which seems at this moment even like another sky so truly is every summer cloud and tint of azure pictured in its transparent mirror. It is quite a place in which to hear Mr. Wordsworth read poetry. Have I ever told you how much his readings and recitations have delighted me? His voice has something quite breeze like in the soft graduation of his swells and falls. How I wish you could have heard it a few evenings since. We had just returned from riding through the deep valley of Grasmere and were talking of different natural sounds which in the stillness of the evening had struck my imagination. Perhaps I said there may be still deeper and richer music pervading all nature than any which we are permitted to hear. He answered by reciting those glorious lines of Milton’s-

Millions of spiritual creatures walk the earth. Unseen both when we wake and when we sleep

And his tones of solemn earnestness, sinking almost dying away into a murmur of veneration as if the passage were breathed forth from the heart."

She and her family were so entranced with Dove’s nest that they had an engraving of the house made which was used on the title page of some of her books. One of these is shown.

Thomas Benson did not marry and had no children. When he died in 1869, the property was inherited by John Benson (1817–1876), one of his relatives who was born in 1817 in Colton and in 1851, married Eleanor Haythornthwaite (1820–1855). The couple had two daughters. John Benson inherited Dove’s Nest in 1869, and lived out his life. When he died in 1876, he set up a trust for the distribution of his estate and Dove’s Nest was in this trust. Documents from the Wordsworth Trust Collection show that the Benson Trust continued until about 1960. During this time the house was let to numerous tenants.

== Later residents ==
The first of these tenants was Captain Thomas Frederick Bolton (1830–1884) of the Westmorland Rifle Volunteers and his wife Ellen Briscoe (1822–1910). He died in 1884 and Ellen continued to rent the house until her death in 1910.

The next tenants were Alfred Holden Illingworth (1869–1925) and his wife Emily Kathleen Wade (1871–1923). He was described as a well-known sportsman and keen angler. His wife died in 1923 and two years later he presented Kelsick Scar to the National Trust to honour her memory. There is a plaque on the Scar which can be seen at this reference.
