= Rydal, Cumbria =

Village in Cumbria, England

Coordinates: 54.433°N 2.983°W

Rydal
- Village
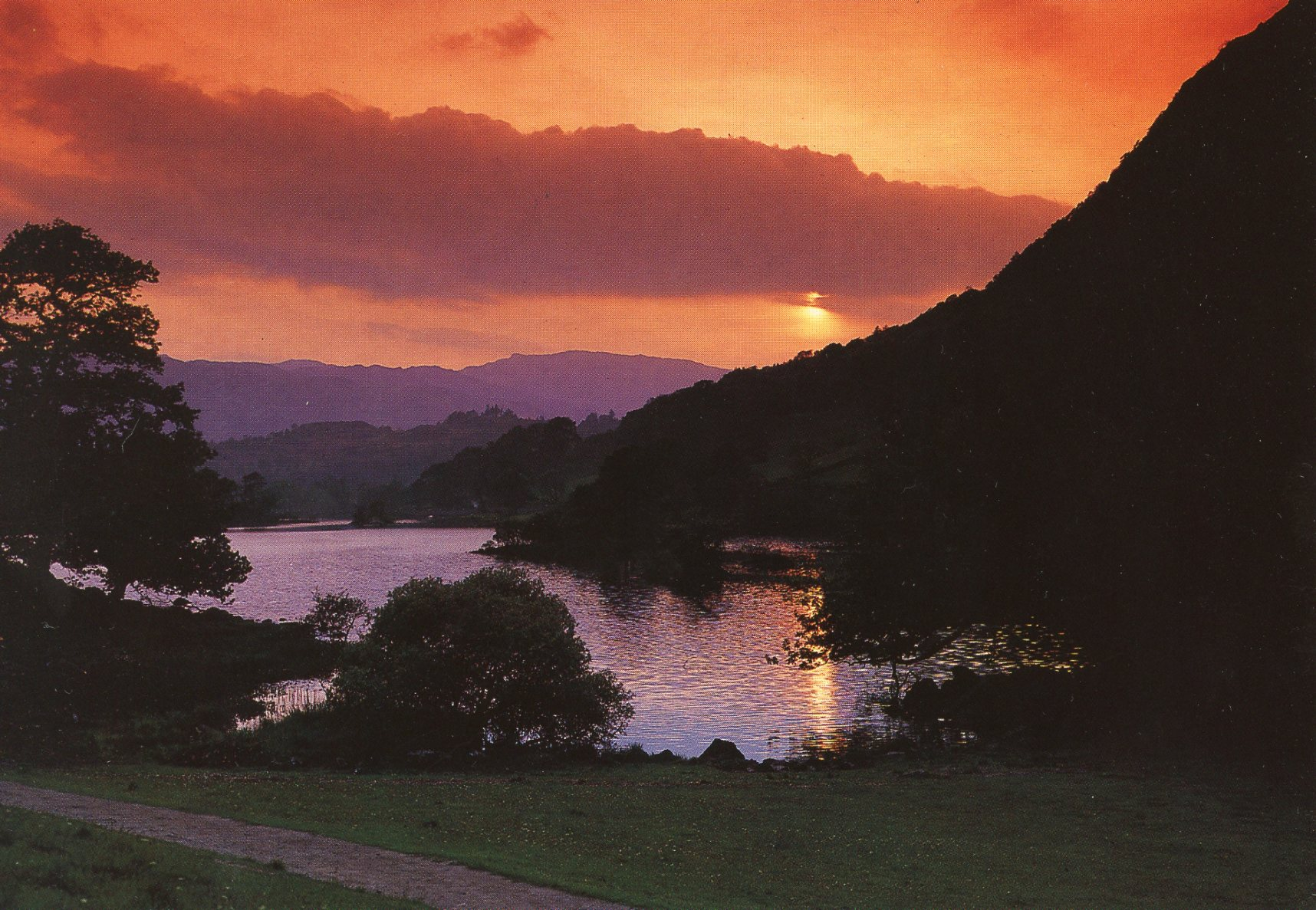
- Rydal, Cumbria

- Location in the former South Lakeland district Location within Cumbria
- Population: 50
- OS grid reference: NY362046
- Civil parish: Lakes
- Unitary authority: Westmorland and Furness
- Ceremonial county: Cumbria
- Region: North West
- Country: England
- Sovereign state: United Kingdom
- Post town: AMBLESIDE
- Postcode district: LA22
- Dialling code: 015394
- Police: Cumbria
- Fire: Cumbria
- Ambulance: North West
- UK Parliament: Westmorland and Lonsdale

Rydal is a village in Cumbria, England. It is a small cluster of houses, a hotel, and St Mary's Church, on the A591 road midway between Ambleside and Grasmere.

Historically part of Westmorland, Rydal is significant in the history of English Romantic literature. William Wordsworth lived at Rydal Mount from 1813 to 1850. Dr Thomas Arnold, notable headmaster of Rugby School, had a summer home at Fox How in nearby Under Loughrigg. Arnold's son, the poet Matthew Arnold, was a frequent visitor and a close friend of Wordsworth. At the northern end of Rydal Water is White Moss House, believed to be the only house owned by Wordsworth, which he bought for his son, Willie and which remained in the Wordsworth family until the 1930s.

Rydal is often a starting point for the Fairfield horseshoe, a hillwalking ridge hike.

As of 1970, the recorded population was about 50 people however no record of its population size since then has been made publicly available.

== Transport ==
Stagecoach Cumbria operates bus services to Keswick, Grasmere, Ambleside, Windermere, Kendal and Lancaster. Additionally, Stagecoach Cumbria offers an open-top service, known as the "Lakesider". (Note: In the evening, Kendal is served.)

The nearest railway station is Windermere; both bus routes provide direct access to and from the station. The station has services to Manchester Airport via Lancaster and Preston. It also runs a shuttle service between Windermere and Oxenholme Station.

== See also ==
- Rydal Mount
- Rydal Water
- Rydal Hall
