= St Mary's Church, Ambleside =

Church in Cumbria, England

St Mary's Church
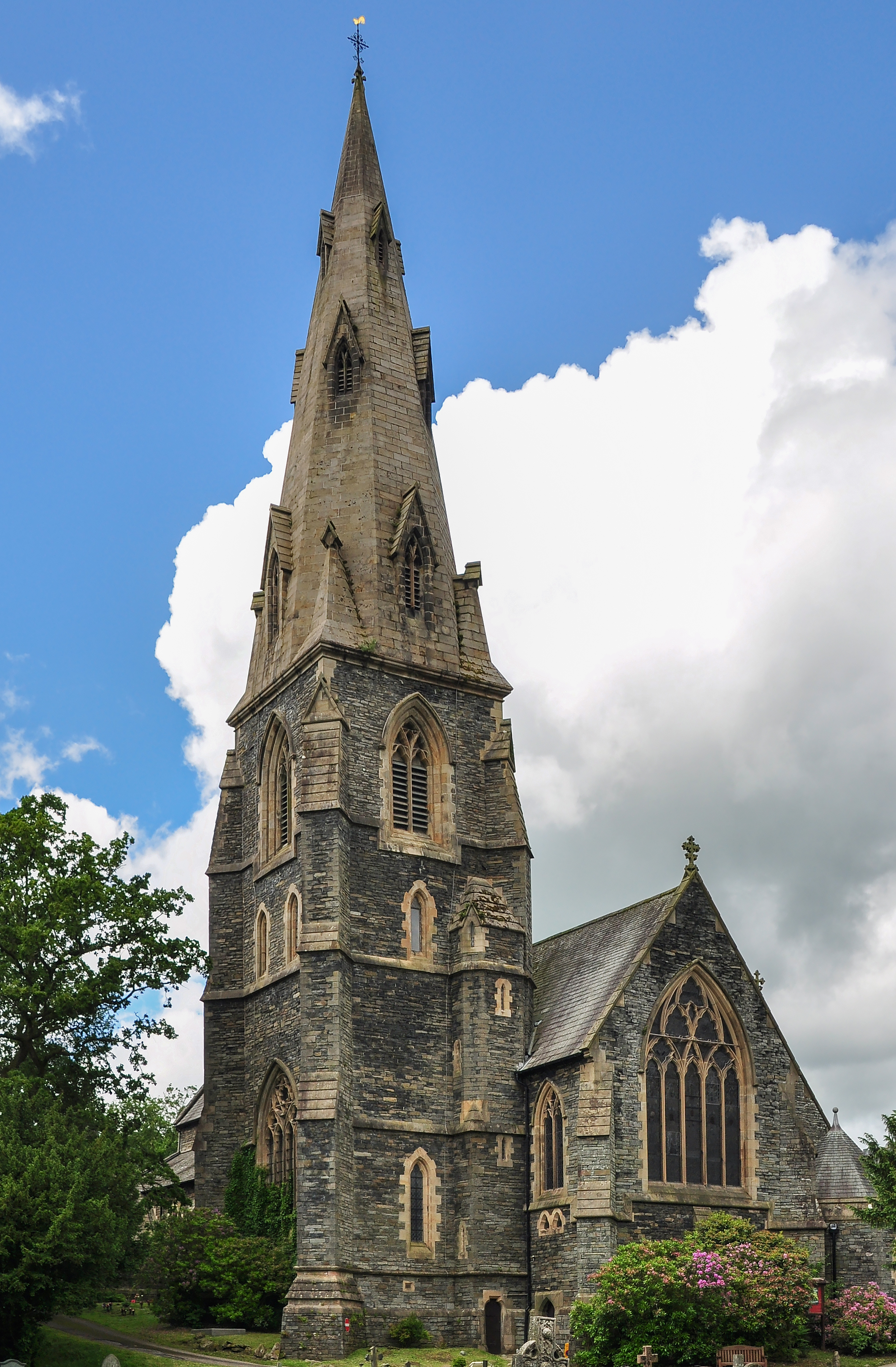

- Location in South Lakeland Location in Cumbria
- 54.430848°N 2.966588°W
- OS grid reference: NY 37396 04360
- Location: Ambleside
- Country: England
- Denomination: Church of England
- Website: amblesidechurch.org.uk

Architecture
- Heritage designation: Grade II*
- Architect: George Gilbert Scott
- Style: Gothic Revival
- Years built: 1850s

Administration
- Province: York
- Diocese: Carlisle
- Archdeaconry: Westmorland

Clergy
- Bishop: James Newcome
- Pastor: Beverley Lock

St Mary's Church is in Ambleside, Cumbria, England. It was built in the 1850s to a design by George Gilbert Scott in Gothic Revival style (specifically Decorated Gothic). The building is Grade II* listed. Notable features include its stone spire, which is a local landmark and an unusual feature in Lake District churches.

The building is constructed of slate, the typical building stone of the locality, and sandstone which is used for dressings and the spire.

== History ==
The decision to build the church reflects the coming of the railway to Windermere in 1847 and the subsequent expansion of Ambleside because of the increased opportunities for tourism.

A north-east choir vestry was added in 1889 to the designs of Paley & Austin of Lancaster.

== Interior ==
=== Wall-painting ===
There is a 26-foot mural on the west wall depicting the traditional ceremony of rushbearing (which still takes place on the first Saturday in July). The mural was created by Gordon Ransom of the Royal College of Art when the College was evacuated to Ambleside during the Second World War. The vicar of Ambleside, Henry Adamson Thompson, is depicted on the right hand side of the mural.

== Bells ==
The tower contains a heavy peal of eight bells cast by John Taylor & Co of Loughborough in 1901. With the tenor weighing 32 and a half long cwt (1,652 kg), they are the fourth heaviest ring of eight in the United Kingdom and the heaviest ring of eight outside of the West Country. The bells can be heard from across Lake Windermere and are considered to be amongst the finest rings of their kind in the UK.

== Burials ==
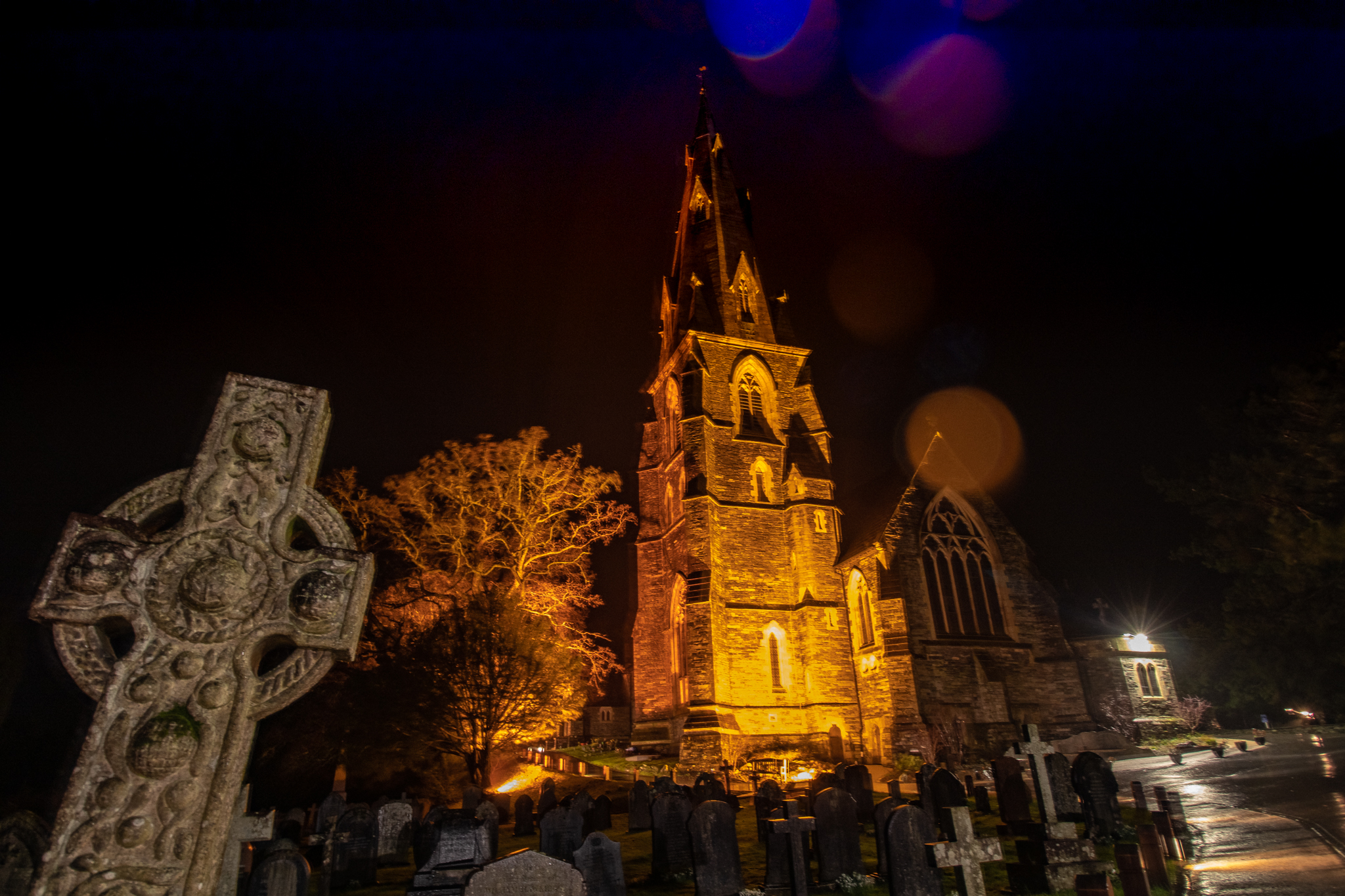
St Mary's Church, Ambleside during Storm Dennis 2020

Burials include Mary Louisa Armitt, the founder of Ambleside's Armitt Library. Her sisters Annie and Sophia are also buried there.
