= Armitt =

Armitt may refer to:

== People with the surname ==
- Annie Armitt (1850–1933), British author
- Charles Armitt (1926—2004), British rugby player
- John Armitt (born 1946), English civil engineer
- John Armitt (wrestler) (1925–2008), New Zealand wrestler
- Mary Louisa Armitt (1851–1911), British polymath, ornithologist, and founder of the Armitt Library
- Sophia Armitt (1847–1908)m British teacher, writer, and naturalist.
- Thomas Armitt (1904—1965), English rugby footballer

== Other uses ==
- Armitt Library, British museum and library
