= Parents' National Educational Union =

British homeschooling organisation

The Parents' National Educational Union (abbreviated PNEU), founded in Bradford, Yorkshire in 1887 as the Parent's Educational Union, was an organisation providing resources and support for teachers and homeschoolers in the United Kingdom in accordance with the educational ideas of Charlotte Mason. Mason was co-founder of PNEU together with Emeline Petrie Steinthal. The word "National" was adopted as part of the name in 1890, and in the same year, the organisation began publishing The Parents' Review, "a monthly magazine of home-training and culture", under the editorial leadership of Charlotte Mason.

== History ==
After its founding, Henrietta Franklin played a key role in the organisation's development. She had met Mason in 1890 and by 1892 she had opened the first school in London based on these principles. In 1894 Franklin became the secretary of the PNEU and went on speaking tours to major cities in America, Europe and South Africa. She devoted her own money to the cause and wrote on its behalf, and her efforts ensured that PNEU gained national and international attention.

In 1978, the World-Wide Education Service (WES) was created as a separate division of the PNEU, encompassing an overseas educational service for company schools and home-schooling.

The last PNEU branch in Birmingham closed in 1984, with the organisation itself closing five years later. The responsibility for the overseas service was given to Bell Educational Trust in Cambridge. Mason's Ambleside-based House of Education (renamed Charlotte Mason College in 1938), founded in 1892 to train governesses, eventually merged with St Martin's College and other institutions to form the University of Cumbria. The teacher training programme at the site was ended in 2010.
