= Beryl Fowler =

British painter

- Born: Mary Beryl Menzies; 1881
- Died: 1963 (aged 81–82)
- Other name: Mary Beryl Fowler
- Education: Herkomer’s Art School
- Known for: painting
- Spouse: Francis "Frank" Hugh Fowler
- Children: W. M. W. Fowler

Beryl Fowler, née Mary Beryl Menzies (1881–1963) was an English painter. Her oil paintings often depict rural life in Eskdale, Cumbria in England.

== Biography ==
Mary Beryl Menzies was born in 1881 in Newcastle upon Tyne. Her father was an engineer. She was married to painter and teacher, Francis "Frank" Hugh Fowler (1878–1945) of Repton. She and her husband studied with German artist Hubert von Herkomer at Herkomer's Art School in Bushey, Hertfordshire.

Her work is included in various museum collections including the Bushey Museum & Art Gallery, the Armitt Museum and Library, the Beacon Museum in Whitehaven, and the Laing Art Gallery.

== See also ==
- List of museums in Cumbria
