= Mechanics' Institute, Manchester =

Listed building in Manchester, England

Mechanics' Institute
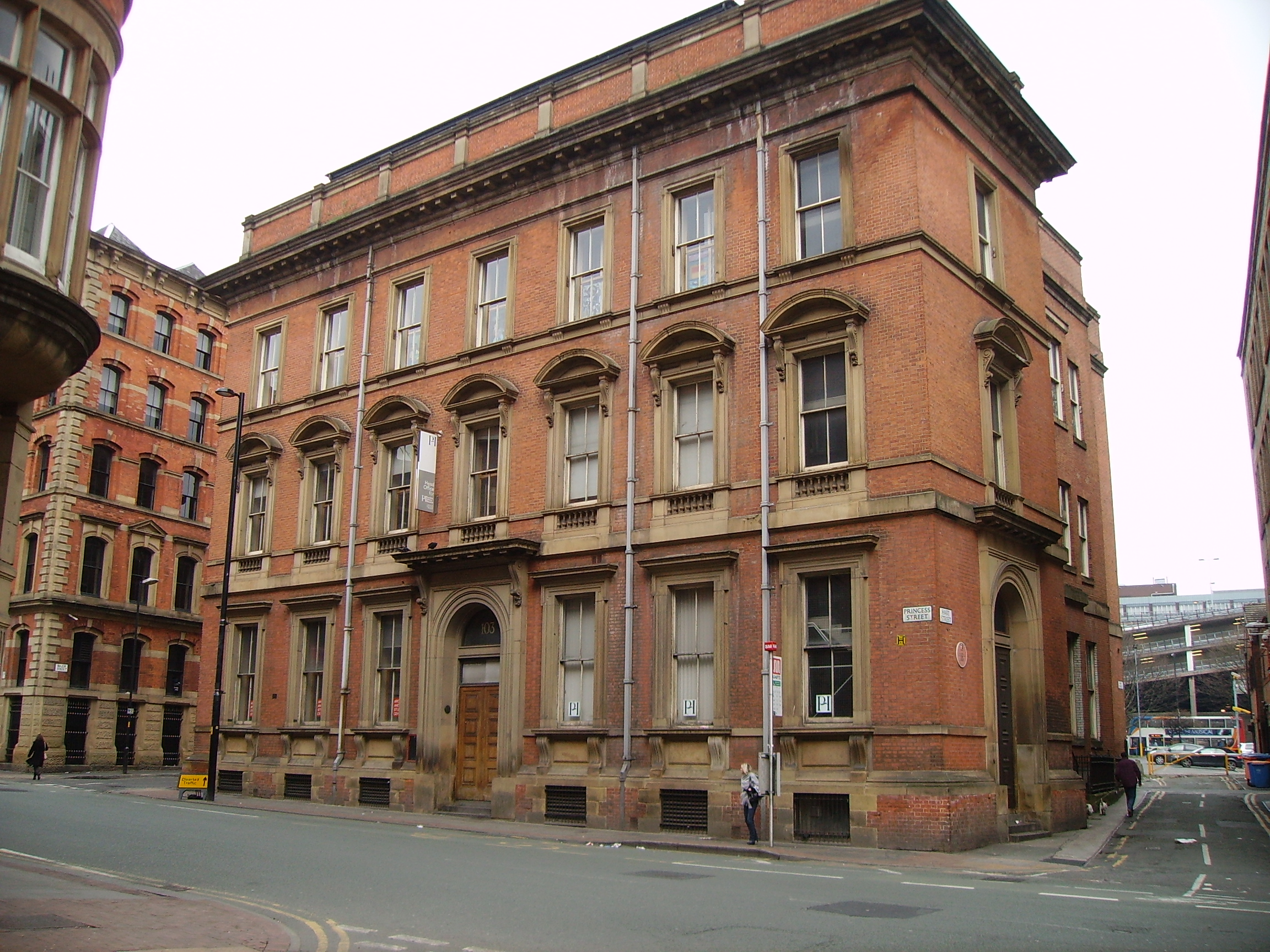
- The Mechanics' Institute in 2011

- Location within Greater Manchester

General information
- Architectural style: Italian palazzo
- Location: Princess Street, Manchester, England
- Coordinates: 53.4769°N 2.2392°W
- Year built: 1854

Design and construction
- Architect: J. E. Gregan
- Designations

Listed Building – Grade II*
- Official name: 103, Princess Street
- Designated: 11 May 1972
- Reference no.: 1247391

Website
- www.mechanicsinstitute.co.uk

The Mechanics' Institute at 103 Princess Street, Manchester, England, is a Grade II* listed building known as the place where the Trades Union Congress, the Co-operative Insurance Society and the institution later called UMIST were founded. Built in 1855 for the Manchester Mechanics' Institution, it is now used by Mechanics Centre Ltd for meetings, functions and conferences.

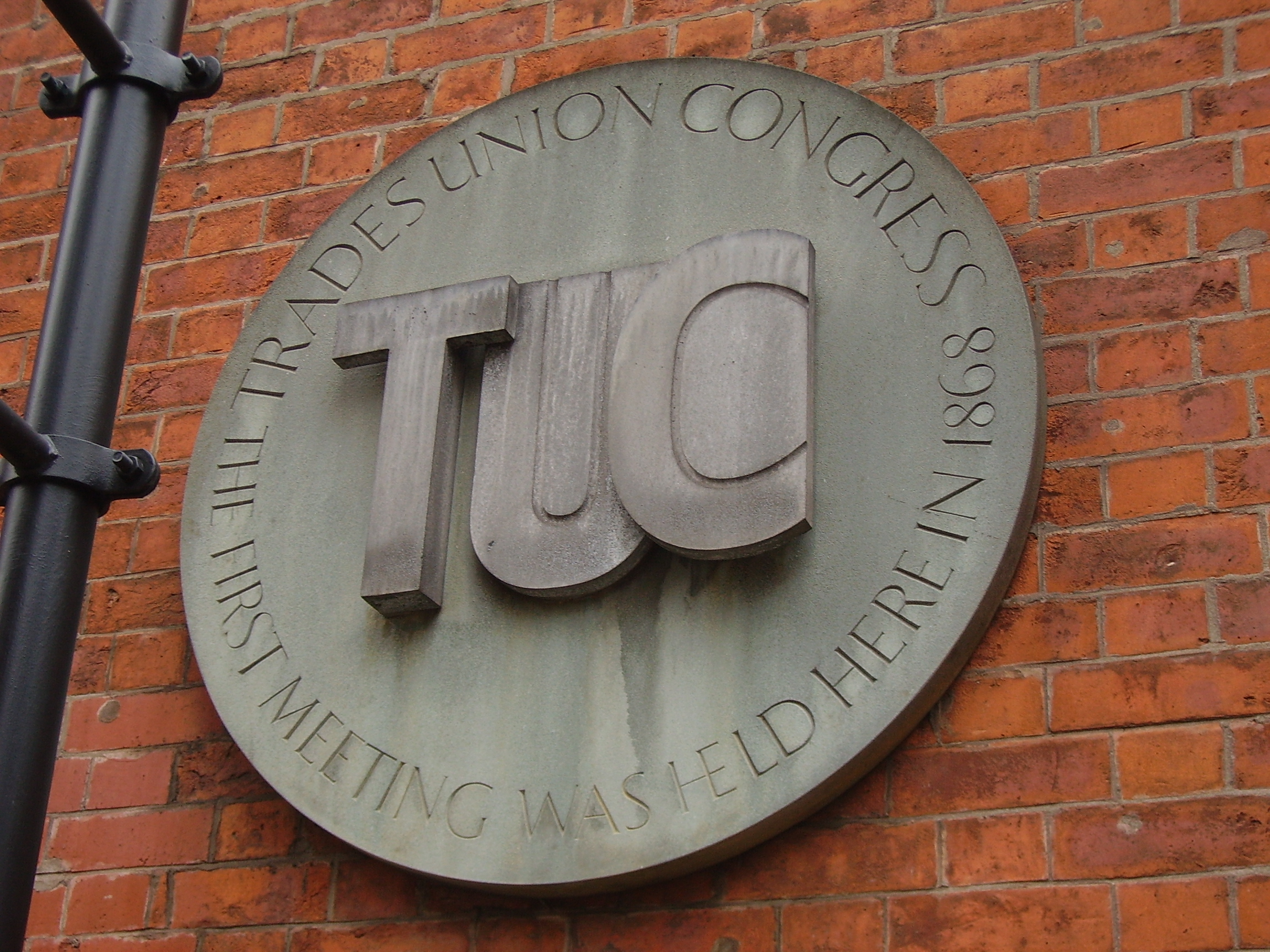
Plaque commemorating the first meeting of the Trades Union Congress at the Mechanics' Institute in 1868

== History ==
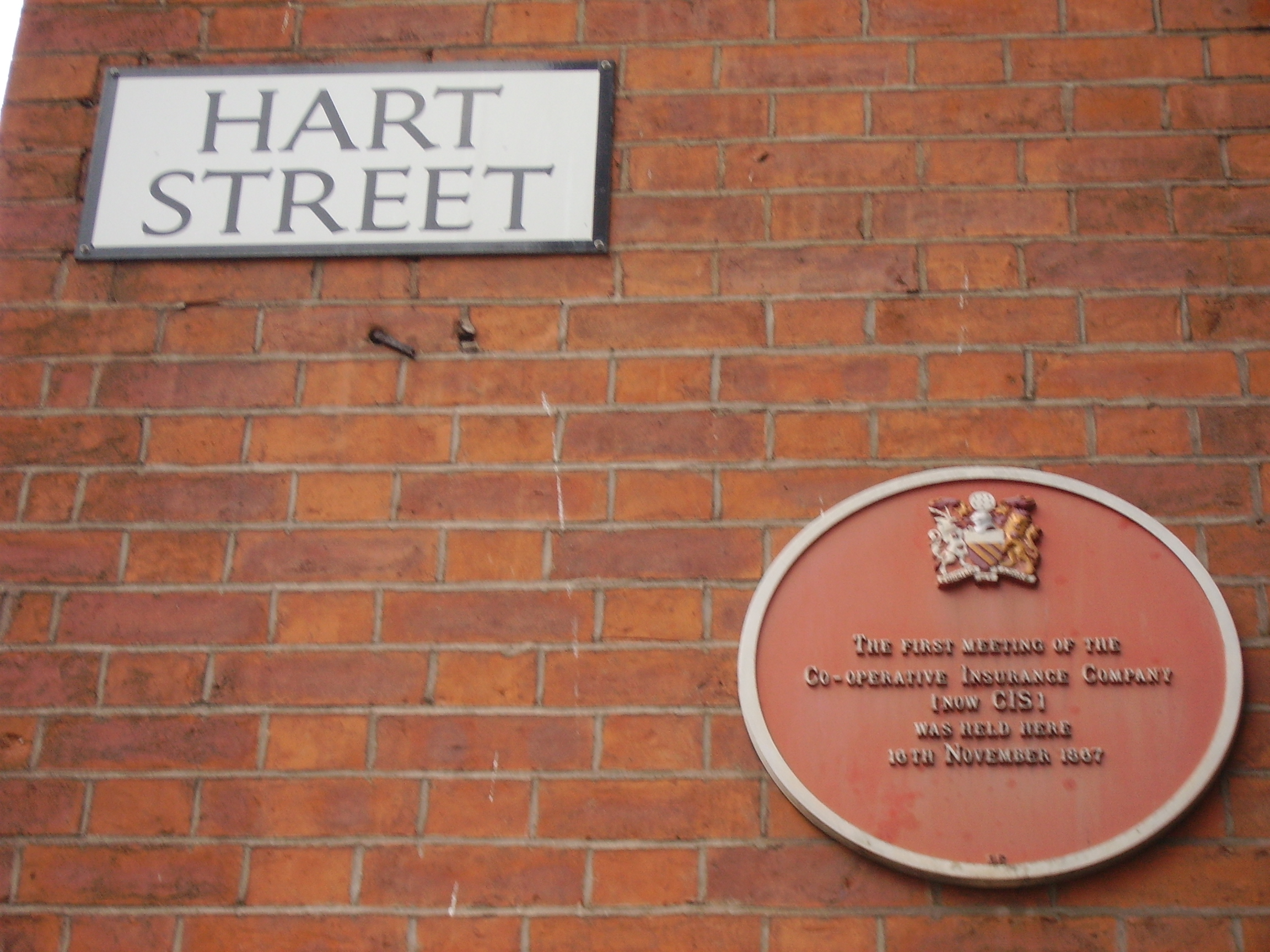
Plaque commemorating the first meeting of the Co-operative Insurance Company at the Mechanics' Institute in 1867

=== Early years ===
The Manchester Mechanics' Institution (not, properly, 'Institute') institute, which was one of many mechanics' institutes in Britain and beyond, was established in Manchester on 7 April 1824 at the Bridgewater Arms hotel. Its purpose was to provide facilities for working men to learn the principles of science through part-time study. The original prospectus of the institute stated

The Manchester Mechanics' Institution is formed for the purpose of enabling Mechanics and Artisans, of whatever trade they may be, to become acquainted with such branches of science as are of practical application in the exercise of that trade; that they may possess a more thorough knowledge of their business, acquire a greater degree of skill in the practice of it, and be qualified to make improvements and even new inventions in the Arts which they respectively profess. It is not intended to teach the trade of the Machine-maker, the Dyer, the Carpenter, the Mason, or any other particular business, but there is no art which does not depend, more or less, on scientific principles, and to teach what these are, and to point out their practical application, will form the chief object of this Institution.

The most notable of the founders were William Fairbairn, John Dalton, Richard Roberts, George William Wood, George Philips, Joseph Brotherton and Benjamin Heywood. The last of these chaired the first meeting, became the leading patron and is often considered to be the founder. Many of these men shared similar interests, such as being Unitarians and members of the Manchester Literary and Philosophical Society, aside from a desire to improve the commercial, industrial and technological life of Manchester. In this regard, Brotherton stood out as a deviation from the norm, for example in politics and religion. Others among the founders were James Murray, Thomas Hopkins, J. C. Dyer and Phillip Novelli, all of whom were later significant figures in the Anti-Corn Law League.

In 1825 the first building in England expressly designed for use as a mechanics' institute was erected for its use in Cooper Street, off Princess Street, in Manchester. This was demolished in the early 1970s.

Although the original purpose of the institute was maintained, it was increasingly the case that emphasis was placed also on the wider social aspects of the organisation. Heywood's initial optimism regarding the moral upliftment of a significant number of working men through technical education was tempered by the realisation that tiredness and even employment status impeded its achievement. From around 1830, the scope of education was widened to include more elementary aspects, there were proposals to set up reading groups in surrounding areas that would be supplied with books from the institute's library, and also moves to encourage involvement in sports and in general social events. Mostly led from the top, although occasionally the result of explicit demands from its membership, the changes included the creation of a room for reading newspapers, a change in the type of lectures, which became less rigidly based on scientific topics, as also did the library stock, and events such as concerts, exhibitions and excursions played a more important role. Facilities for educating women and children were also introduced but, for example, a request to begin classes in history was rejected because of fears that it would lead to debates about politics.

This institute organised the first City exhibition in 1837 and this led to a large number of similar exhibitions in English industrial towns and cities. By the 1840s, the exhibitions included thousands of casts, busts and masks relating to the fashionable subject of phrenology and were attracting over 100,000 visitors. The Manchester Phrenological Society used its facilities.

=== Relocation ===
The institute moved to the current building in 1855. The building was designed by J. E. Gregan in an Italian palazzo style and was Gregan's last work.

The inaugural meeting of the Trades Union Congress was held in the building, 2–6 June 1868. In 1882 it was decided to establish a technical school, the Technical School and Mechanics' Institution; it opened in September 1882. This was the beginning of the institution later known as UMIST.

=== 20th century–present ===
On 11 May 1972, the building was designated a Grade II* listed structure.

As of 1988 it is home to Mechanics Centre Ltd, a not for profit organisation, which provides various rooms for meetings, functions and conferences.

== Architecture ==
The building is constructed of red brick with stone detailing. Its roof cannot be seen from the street. It has an uneven layout set within a parallelogram-shaped plot on an island site, and its appearance follows the Italian palazzo tradition. It has three storeys, a cellar and an added attic level, arranged in seven evenly spaced bays. The front has a stone base, horizontal bands marking each floor, a plain strip below the roofline, and a deep cornice with small brackets. A tall parapet with shallow pilasters hides the later attic addition.

The main entrance is a round‑headed doorway with a shaped stone frame and a very large projecting cornice supported on brackets. All floors have tall four‑pane sash windows with shaped stone surrounds. On the ground floor these windows have cornices, decorative panels beneath, and raised sills on large brackets. On the first floor they have curved pediments on brackets and blind balustrade‑like panels below, linked by a horizontal band.

The left side wall has one bay matching the front, including a plaque near the corner. Beyond this, the wall steps forward and the next section contains a large three‑part window on each floor. Both have stone surrounds, but the upper window is larger and has round‑headed openings.

According to a contemporary architectural review: "It set a standard for the scale of the commercial warehouses which were to follow, but the nobility and purity of the design sets it apart from its neighbours".

== Notable alumni ==
- Mary Louisa Armitt (1851–1911), founded the Armitt Library
- Robert Whitehead (1823–1905), engineer and developer of the first self-propelled torpedo
- Ellen Wilkinson (1891–1947), Labour Party MP and social justice campaigner

== See also ==
- Grade II* listed buildings in Greater Manchester
- Listed buildings in Manchester-M1

== Sources ==
- Pevsner, Nicholas; Hartwell, Clare & Hyde, Matthew, The Buildings of England: Lancashire — Manchester and the South East (2004) Yale University Press ISBN 0-300-10583-5
