= The Rum Story =

Museum in Whitehaven, England

Coordinates: 54.5482°N 3.5889°W

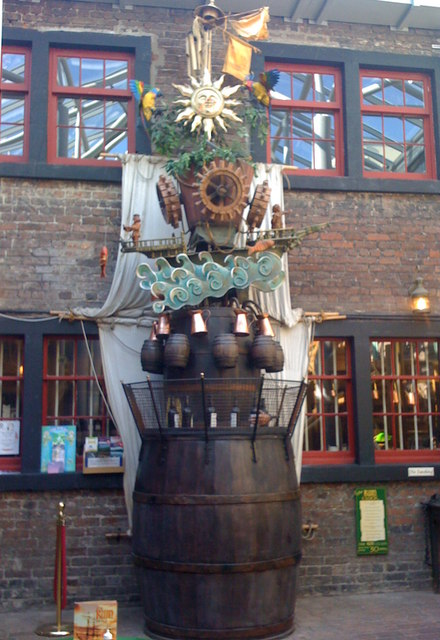
Clock at the Rum Story.

The Rum Story is a visitor attraction in Whitehaven, Cumbria, England. It presents the story of the rum trade and the creation of rum. It is located in an original 1785 trading shop and warehouses.

The Rum Story was started with United Kingdom National Lottery funding from the Millennium Commission and opened in May 2000. It was voted Cumbria Tourism's "Small Visitor Attraction" in 2007.

The Jefferson family, wine merchants, imported wine and spirits for over two centuries until 1998. Their story is covered by The Rum Story. The first of this family to move to Whitehaven was Robert Jefferson (1704-1779). He became a master mariner working in the tobacco trade from Virginia to Whitehaven. At this time, Whitehaven was a major tobacco importer, capitalising on a position relatively protected from the sequence of wars with the French.

In 1832, brothers Henry and Robert Jefferson provided a mortgage on two estates in Antigua that were owned by the heirs of Rear Admiral Sir William Ogilvy (the lead executor was his son, Sir John Ogilvy, 9th Baronet). These were York's Estate (which had 146 enslaved people) and the New Division Estate (309 enslaved people). The indenture which effected this mortgage is owned by the Rum Story.

In 2025, the museum announced plans to update its exhibits to highlight Whitehaven's "glossed over" ties to slavery, using money from the National Lottery Heritage Fund. The Whitehaven Harbour Commissioners, alongside the non-profit Anti-Racist Cumbria, announced they would work with historians to fact-check details. They noted that for years, the involvement of ports like Whitehaven in the slave trade had not been accurately represented. This meant that "intergenerational consequences, including trauma had been ignored". There had been "active avoidance or euphemism", with terms such as "shipping" or the "Virginia Trade" bring used to refer to slavery.

== See also ==
- List of museums in Cumbria
- List of food and beverage museums
