= John Edgar Gregan =

Scottish architect

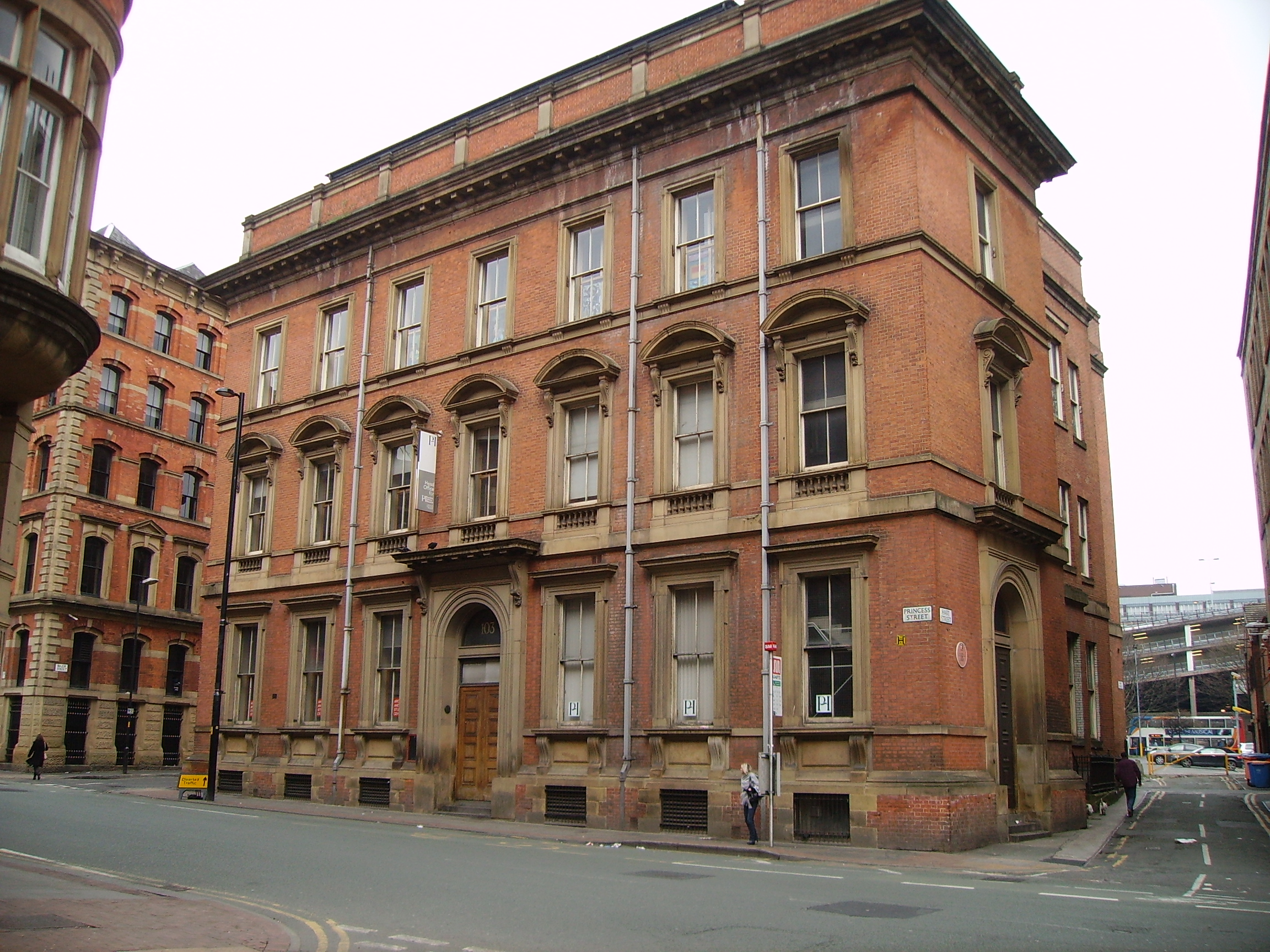
The Mechanics' Institute, 103, Princess Street, Manchester

John Edgar Gregan (1813–1855), was a Scottish architect.

Gregan was born at Dumfries on 18 December 1813. He studied architecture first under Walter Newall and afterwards at Manchester under Thomas Witlam Atkinson. He commenced practice on his own account in 1840, and was engaged on many important buildings erected in Manchester during the next fifteen years, including the churches of St James' Breightmet, St Peter's, Belmont, St John, Longsight, and St John, Miles Platting; the warehouses of Robert Barbour and Thomas Ashton, and the bank of Sir Benjamin Heywood & Co. in St. Ann's Street. His last work was the design for the new Mechanics' Institution in David Street (later renamed Princess Street).

His zeal for art and education led him to take much interest in various local institutions. He was elected to membership of the Manchester Literary and Philosophical Society on 25 January 1848, he acted as honorary secretary of the Royal Institution, assisted materially in the success of the local school of art, and sat as a member of the committee which undertook the formation of the Manchester Free Library. On the visit of the British Archæological Association to Manchester, he read a paper entitled 'Notes on Humphrey Chetham and his Foundation,' which is printed in the association's journal for 1851. He died at York Place, Manchester, on 29 April 1855, aged 42, and was buried in St. Michael's churchyard, Dumfries.
