= W. M. W. Fowler =

English Royal Air Force pilot and cookbook author

William Menzies Weekes Fowler
- Born: 14 July 1914; Lostock, Bolton, Lancashire, England
- Died: 1977
- Other names: W. M. W. Fowler, Willie Fowler
- Parents: Francis Hugh Fowler (father); Beryl Fowler (mother)

William Menzies Weekes Fowler (14 July 1914 – 1977) was an English Royal Air Force pilot and author of the cookbook Countryman's Cooking.

== Biography ==
Fowler was born in 1914 in Lostock, Bolton, Lancashire, to parents Beryl Fowler (née Menzies) and Francis Hugh Fowler. He went to Durham School. He settled in Eskdale, Cumbria.

A Lancaster bomber pilot in the Second World War, he was shot down in July 1941 over Münster, Germany. Subsequently, Fowler was detained in several prison camps until he was moved to Stalag Luft III in April 1943.

After the war he returned to Eskdale where he farmed mink and daffodils. In 1965, he published his cookbook Countryman's Cooking, which focused upon the preparation and cooking of game and fish. While the first edition of his book was not popular, the 2006 edition proved more so, selling over 10,000 copies.

His writing is studded with amusing anecdotes and his forthright opinions about a wide variety of topics, some of which were considered "racy". Notably, the book details an infamous spoof recipe on cooking cormorant that includes the memorable advice, "hang up by the feet with a piece of wire, soak in petrol and set on fire" (taken from Fowler, 2006).

Fowler was married three times. He married his second wife Toni Richards (also known as "Slosh"), in 1958. She was the inspiration for his published work and Countryman's Cooking is dedicated to her.

Fowler died in 1977.

== Publications ==
- Fowler, W.M.W. (2006) [1965]. Countryman's Cooking. Ludlow: Excellent Press. ISBN 1-900318-29-6.
