= List of museums in Cumbria =

This list of museums in Cumbria, England contains museums which are defined for this context as institutions (including nonprofit organizations, government entities, and private businesses) that collect and care for objects of cultural, artistic, scientific, or historical interest and make their collections or related exhibits available for public viewing. Also included are non-profit art galleries and university art galleries. Museums that exist only in cyberspace (i.e., virtual museums) are not included.

Name	Image	Town/City	Type	Summary
Abbot Hall Art Gallery		Kendal	Art	Collections include George Romney, J. M. W. Turner, 18th and 19th century watercolours, and modern paintings
Armitt Library		Ambleside	Multiple	Local history, natural history, features over 450 watercolours by Beatrix Potter of archaeological and zoological subjects
Beacon Museum, Whitehaven		Whitehaven	Multiple	website, local history, art, industry, natural history, maritime heritage
Beatrix Potter Gallery		Hawkshead	Art	Operated by the National Trust, original sketches and watercolours by Beatrix Potter for her books
Birdoswald Roman Fort		Gilsland	Archaeology	Excavated Roman fort
Blackwell		Bowness-on-Windermere	Historic house	Arts and Crafts Movement style house from the turn-of-the-20th century, with period rooms, art exhibits
Brantwood		Coniston	Historic house	Home and museum of art critic John Ruskin, art displays, gardens and grounds
Brougham Hall		Brougham	Historic house	Restored country house with local history exhibits
Carlisle Castle		Carlisle	Military	Operated by English Heritage, historic fortress and museum of the Duke of Lancaster's Regiment
Dalemain Estate		Ullswater	Historic house	Medieval, Tudor and early Georgian house and Lake District gardens
Dalton Castle		Dalton-in-Furness	Local	Operated by the National Trust, 14th century peel tower with displays of local history
Derwent Island House		Keswick	Historic house	Operated by the National Trust, 18th-century house on an island, open only a few days a year by timed ticket
Derwent Pencil Museum		Keswick	Industry	Pencil making
Dock Museum		Barrow-in-Furness	Local	Local history, shipbuilding, steel industry, World War II bombings
Dove Cottage		Grasmere	Historic house	A home and museum of poet William Wordsworth
Guildhall Museum, Carlisle		Carlisle	Historic House	website, 1407 building with items related to Guilds
Haig Colliery Mining Museum		Whitehaven	Mining	Coal mining
Hawkshead Grammar School Museum		Hawkshead	Education	Historic school dating back to the 17th century
Helena Thompson Museum		Workington	Multiple	website, period rooms, costumes, decorative arts, local history, industry, culture, agriculture
Heron Corn Mill		Beetham	Mill	Working 18th-century watermill
Hill Top		Near Sawrey	Historic house	Operated by the National Trust, home of children's author Beatrix Potter
Holker Hall		Grange-over-Sands	Historic house	Large country house and gardens
Hub of the North Pennines Museum		Alston	Multiple	website, vintage cars, motorbikes, bicycles, local history, agriculture, model railroad
Hutton in the Forest		Penrith	Historic house	Medieval manor house and gardens
Kendal Museum		Kendal	Multiple	Local history, culture, archaeology, geology, local and world natural history, Roman Britain, Ancient Egypt
Keswick Museum and Art Gallery		Keswick	Multiple	Local history, natural history, minerals, art, collection of oddities
Lakeland Motor Museum		Backbarrow	Automotive	Classic automobiles and memorabilia
Laurel and Hardy Museum		Ulverston	Biographical	website, comedy team Laurel and Hardy
Levens Hall		Kendal	Historic house	Manor house, topiary garden, steam vehicle and engine collection
Maryport Maritime Museum		Maryport	Maritime	website, Maryport's maritime and painting history, also industry, social and political history
Millom Discovery Centre		Millom	Local	Period store displays, iron mining, rural trades, 19th century miner's cottage, agriculture, archaeology, poet Norman Nicholson, local history
Mirehouse		Keswick	Historic house	17th-century house and gardens with connections to Lord Tennyson, Edward Fitzgerald, Thomas Carlyle and William Wordsworth
Muncaster Castle		Ravenglass	Historic house	Decorated castle, gardens
Museum of Lakeland Life & Industry		Kendal	Multiple	Local history, period rooms, agriculture, mining, Arts & Crafts movement, costumes
Nenthead Mines Heritage Centre		Nenthead	Mining	website, mineral mining past of the North Pennines, lead and zinc mine, equipment, buildings
Norman Centre		Appleby-in-Westmorland	History	website, castle keep with interactive experience
Penrith and Eden Museum		Penrith	Local	website, local history, geology, archaeology
Quaker Tapestry		Kendal	Religious	77 embroidered panels illustrating the history of the Quakers from the 17th century to the present
Ravenglass & Eskdale Railway		Ravenglass	Railway	Heritage railway and museum at the station
Rheged Centre		Penrith	Art	website, attraction with galleries for art and photography, also 3D films, shops, play areas
Rum Story		Whitehaven	Industry	Story of the rum trade and the creation of rum, located in an original 1785 trading shop and warehouses
Ruskin Museum		Coniston	Local	Local history, copper mining, slate, geology, lace, farming, art critic John Ruskin, car and motorboat racer Donald Campbell
Rydal Mount		Ambleside	Historic house	A home and museum of poet William Wordsworth
Senhouse Roman Museum		Maryport	Archaeology	website, site of the Roman fort Alauna, artifacts
Sir John Barrow Cottage		Ulverston	Historic house	Birthplace of statesman Sir John Barrow, 1st Baronet, currently closed
Sizergh Castle & Garden		Helsington	Historic house	Operated by the National Trust, medieval castle, stately home and garden, woodlands
Solway Aviation Museum		Carlisle	Aviation	Located at the Carlisle Lake District Airport, World War II aviation and local aviation history
Solway Coast Discovery Centre		Silloth	Local	website, local history, culture, natural history, art gallery
Stott Park Bobbin Mill		Newby Bridge	Industry	Operated by English Heritage, former bobbin mill with preserved engines
Threlkeld Quarry & Mining Museum		Threlkeld	Mining	website, former microgranite quarry, exhibits, tools and artifacts from area mines
Townend		Troutbeck	Historic house	Operated by the National Trust, wealthy farming family's house
Tullie House Museum and Art Gallery		Carlisle	Multiple	Contemporary and historic art, decorative art, costumes and textiles, natural history, archaeology, Roman Britain, Carlisle's social history
Windermere Jetty: Museum of Boats, Steam and Stories		Windermere	Maritime	Boat collection and "the sights, smells and sounds of life on the lake"
Wordsworth House		Cockermouth	Historic house	Operated by the National Trust, 18th century Georgian townhouse, childhood home of poet William Wordsworth
World in Miniature Museum		Houghton	Toy	website, collection of miniature furnished room displays

== Defunct museums ==
- Cars of the Stars Motor Museum, Keswick, closed in 2011
- Cumberland Toy and Model Museum, Cockermouth, website
- Florence Mine Heritage Centre, Egremont
- James Bond Museum, Keswick, closed in 2011
- Keswick Mining Museum, Cotehill, website
- Lanternhouse International, Ulverston, website
- RAF Millom Museum, closed in 2010

== See also ==
- Visitor attractions in Cumbria
