= Windermere and Troutbeck =

National Trust property in Cumbria, England

Coordinates: 54.390°N 2.915°W

Windermere and Troutbeck (including Bridge House) is a National Trust property consisting of land around Windermere, a lake in Cumbria, England.

This National Trust property includes the head of the Troutbeck Valley, several sites next to Windermere, and six farms. One of the farms — Troutbeck Park — once belonged to Beatrix Potter and was, in fact, her largest farm.

Other popular places on the property include Ambleside Roman Fort, Bridge House in Ambleside, and Cockshott Point in Bowness-on-Windermere.
