= St Martin's College =

British higher education college

Coordinates: 54.8912°N 2.9206°W

- Motto: Scio cui credidi (I know Him in whom I have believed)
- Type: Higher Education College
- Active: 1964–2007
- Location: Lancaster, Ambleside, Carlisle, Whitehaven, Barrow and London, UK
- Website: www.cumbria.ac.uk

St Martin's College (Note: The college's name is sometimes given as S Martin's or S. Martin's according to traditional usage.) was a British higher education college with campuses in Lancaster, Ambleside and Carlisle, as well as sites in Whitehaven, Barrow and London. Established as a teacher training college, it ultimately provided undergraduate and postgraduate courses in the arts, humanities, business studies, teacher training, health and social care. In 2006 the college was granted the power to award its own degrees – prior to this they were accredited by Lancaster University. On 1 August 2007, the college merged with other institutions to form the University of Cumbria.

== Foundation ==
St Martin's College opened in Lancaster in 1964, founded by the Church of England as a college of education to train teachers, one of only two church colleges to be established in the 20th century. Built on the former site of Bowerham Barracks, the college opened with 89 students. The college was officially opened by the Queen Mother in 1967.

The college was named after St Martin of Tours, a Roman soldier who tore his cloak in two to clothe a naked beggar and later had a vision of Christ wearing the cloak. It is significant because just as St Martin renounced his life as a soldier after this to take on a life of caring and teaching, Bowerham Barracks left behind its military past to become a Church College.

The college's founder principal was Dr Hugh Pollard, who stayed with the college until his retirement in 1976. He had overseen the college’s establishment and led it through its formative years. The student population had grown to 700 students by the time of Dr Pollard’s retirement.

== Expansion ==
Pollard was replaced by Robert Clayton, who had been previously principal of Matlock College in Derbyshire. During his time in charge, the college branched out into Health, Radiography and Nursing courses, areas that would form a substantial part of the college’s provision from then on. In 1989, Mr Clayton announced his intention to retire. His replacement was Dr Ian Edynbry, formerly Vice-Principal of Worcester College of Higher Education and Assistant Principal at Middlesex Polytechnic.

Dr. Edynbry was to oversee the college’s greatest expansion to date, as St Martin's started to establish campuses in Cumbria. In 1996, Charlotte Mason College in Ambleside became part of St Martin's College to become its first campus in Cumbria. Originally an independent college, it had previously become part of Lancaster University. This was soon followed in 1998 by the college's acquisition of Carlisle's former City General Hospital and City Maternity Hospital (originally a Workhouse) on Fusehill Street. The college had been active in Carlisle since 1995, since its takeover of the Lakeland College of Nursing. It was left to Edynbry's successor to take these new campus developments forward, as he announced he was to retire earlier than expected in 1997.

The new Principal was Professor Chris Carr, whose previous role was as Pro-Vice Chancellor of University of Central Lancashire. Professor Carr faced the challenge of bringing cohesion to a diverse and multi-campus institution, whilst encouraging further diversification and expansion. Developments continued on each campus during that time, with new sports complexes built in Carlisle and Lancaster, a new library named the Charlotte Mason Library on the Ambleside campus and new en-suite halls of residence built on the Carlisle campus. The Carlisle campus was subsequently enhanced with modern facilities including en-suite student accommodation and the "Learning Gateway", a building kitted out with state-of-the-art IT to aid flexible and distributed learning. The Alexandra Building was opened on the Lancaster campus in 2004, a teaching and learning block with dedicated facilities for the arts.

As of 2005, over 11,500 students studied at St Martin's College, which by then employed over 1000 staff. The college had a substantial national reputation in teacher training and nursing, as the largest provider of teachers in the UK and a major provider of Health Care Practitioners in the North and North-West. The college had a diverse undergraduate and postgraduate portfolio with degrees accredited by Lancaster University. As the largest provider of Higher Education in Cumbria, St Martin's College offered a range of courses from the traditional academic subjects to Sport Studies, British Psychological Society (BPS) accredited Psychology, Information Technology and Environmental Management, to name just a few.

== Merger ==
St Martin's College, Cumbria Institute of the Arts and the Cumbrian sites of the University of Central Lancashire (UCLan) in Carlisle and Penrith amalgamated to form the University of Cumbria on 1 August 2007. This was instigated by a HEFCE (Higher Education Funding Council for England) report by Sir Martin Harris, published in September 2005, which recommended the amalgamation of the two institutions (UCLan's involvement came about after the report was published) to best serve the higher education needs of Cumbria.

== Legacy ==
=== St Martin's Lancaster campus ===
As of 2026 the University of Cumbria retains a presence in Lancaster. The original St Martin's campus was reduced in size by selling some land for social housing.

=== Charlotte Mason Ambleside campus ===
On 1 December 2009, the University of Cumbria announced that the Ambleside campus would be 'mothballed' at the end of July 2010, and would no longer take new undergraduate students. The action, if it led to closure, would have ended over 175 years of heritage and a protest was held on 1 December 2009 by the student body, with more actions following by students, the townspeople of Ambleside. Tim Farron MP also voiced his support for the campus and students.

Hundreds of local people have signed this petition and that shows how committed the community is to stopping this closure from happening. Now that the issue has national attention, I hope that the University will take notice of level of protest against this proposal and will reconsider their decision to downgrade Ambleside Campus...

— Tim Farron, speaking in the Commons.

In July 2011, the university announced a plan to reopen the Ambleside campus and increase student numbers, and this began in 2014. The campus now runs a variety of environmental, forestry, business and outdoor education courses.

=== St Martin's Carlisle campus ===
The Fusehill Street campus became the headquarters of the University. In 2025 it additionally became home to the Pears Cumbria School of Medicine, a collaboration between the University of Cumbria and Imperial College London.
