= Frederic Yates =

English painter (1854–1919)

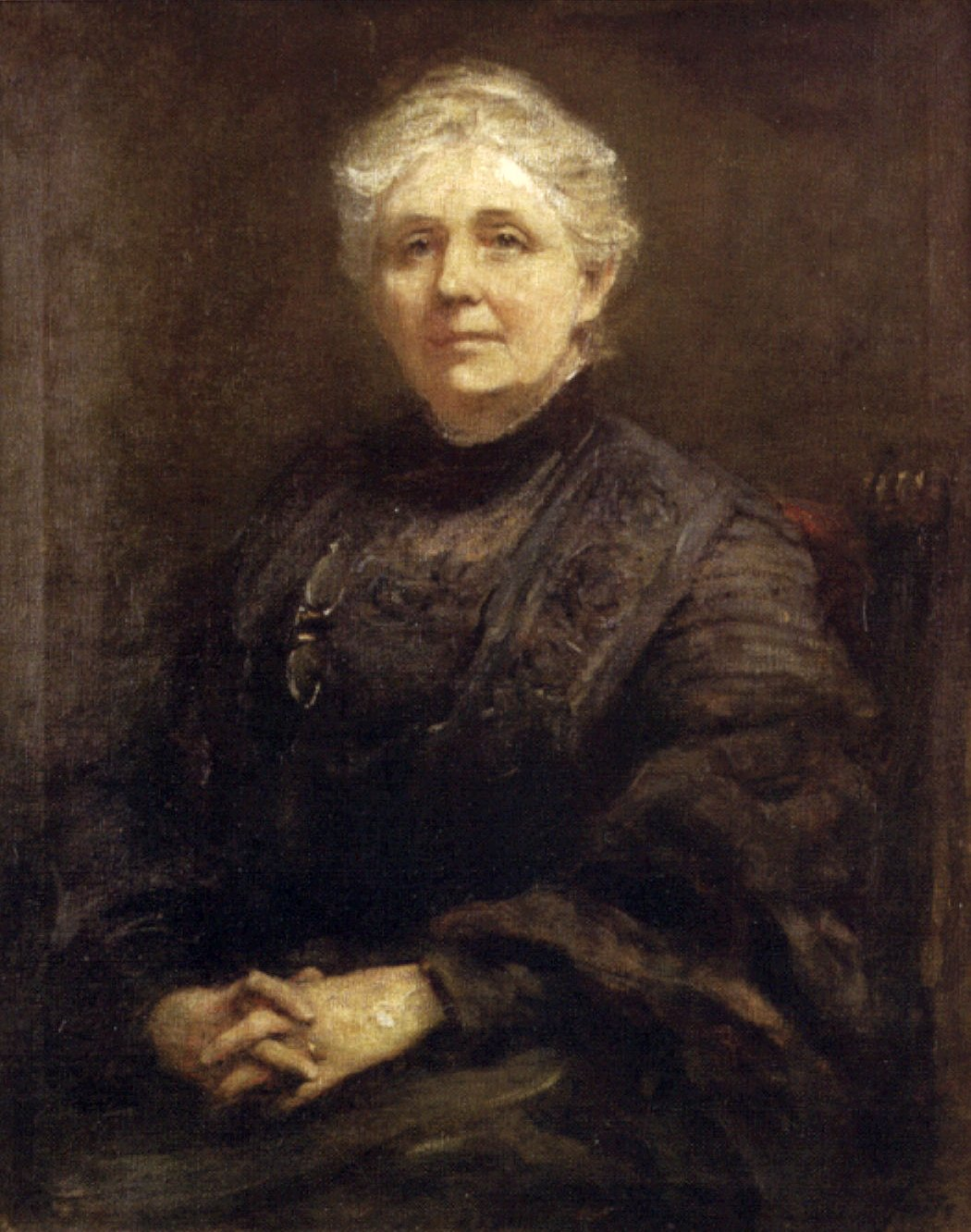
'Portrait of Anna Rice Cooke', oil on canvas painting by Frederic Yates, 1910, Honolulu Museum of Art

Frederic Yates (1854–1919) was an English painter. He painted landscapes and portraits including President Woodrow Wilson and Sanford Ballard Dole, the only president of Hawaii. He settled in the Lake District.

== Life ==
Frederic Keeping was born in Southampton in 1854, and his family later relocated to Liverpool before settling in America. For some reason the family changed their name from Keeping to Yates.

He studied painting in the Paris ateliers of Léon Bonnat, Gustave Boulanger, and Jules Joseph Lefebvre. In 1886, he moved to San Francisco where his family had settled a few years earlier. He married Emily, an American, in 1887. In San Francisco, he became a popular portraitist and taught at the newly formed Art Students League of San Francisco.

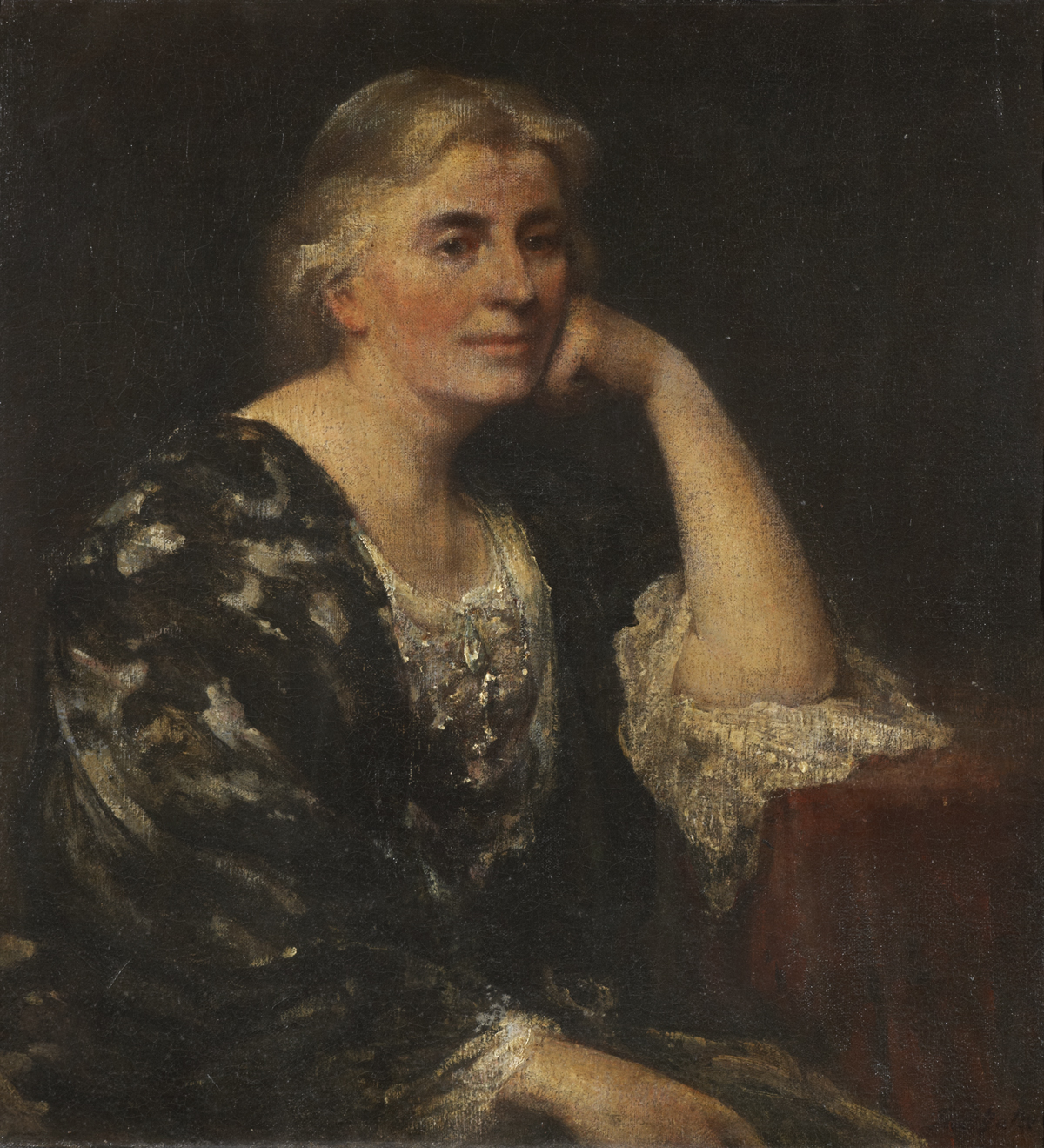
Mary Yates by Frederic Yates

In 1890 Frederic and Emily moved to Kent where their daughter Mary was born the following year. The three of them went to America to see Mary's grandparents. Whilst he was in Hawaii Yates painted the Hawaiian President Dole. They visited both China and Japan over the next few years.

Frederic made the acquaintance of the Dowager Marchioness of Downshire who became his patron and introduced him to London society. Yates was active in San Francisco until 1900, when he returned to England. Yates had a commission to paint the educationalist Charlotte Mason in the Lake District and he decided to bring his daughter up there. They lived at "Cote How" near Grasmere until 1906. During this period he painted the educator John Haden Badley. He was invited to America to attend the inauguration of United States President Woodrow Wilson and to paint his portrait. According to Armitt Library, Yates was given the flag that Woodrow Wilson rested his hand on whilst taking his oath of office. He died in 1919.

The Honolulu Museum of Art and the National Portrait Gallery, London are among the public collections holding work by Frederic Yates. There are 21 paintings in public collections in the United Kingdom.
