= Charlotte Mason =

British educator and reformer

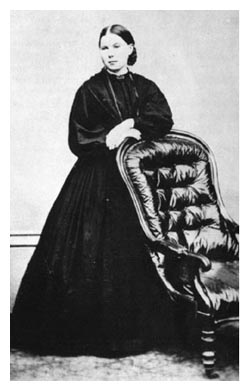
- Born: 1 January 1842; Bangor, Gwynedd, Wales
- Died: 16 January 1923 (aged 81); Ambleside, England
- Education: Home and Colonial Society
- Occupation: Educator
- Employer(s): Bishop Otter Teacher Training College, self-employed

Charlotte Maria Shaw Mason (1 January 1842 – 16 January 1923) was a British educator and reformer in England at the turn of the twentieth century. She proposed to base the education of children upon a wide and liberal curriculum. She worked for five years under Fanny Trevor at Bishop Otter College.

Mason's philosophy of education has been summarized as emanating from two principles, that "children are born persons" and "education is the science of relations." Mason promoted a humanistic and highly integrative model for education which emphasized cultivating a love of learning in children as well as spiritual and moral formation. Her theories have become especially influential in the Christian education and homeschooling movements.

== Biography ==
Charlotte Mason was born in the hamlet of Garth near Bangor on the Northwest tip of Wales, near Caernarfon. Garth has now been incorporated into the modern city of Bangor. An only child, she was mostly educated at home by her parents.

Mason taught for more than ten years at Davison School in Worthing, England. During this time she developed her vision for "a liberal education for all".

Mason was employed in 1874 at the Bishop Otter Teacher Training College under the Lady Principal of Fanny Trevor in Chichester. She worked there till 1878 as Senior Governess and gave a series of lectures about the education of children under 9, later published as Home Education (1886).

Between 1880 and 1892, Mason wrote a popular geography series called The Ambleside Geography Books:

- Elementary Geography: Book I for Standard II (1881)
- The British Empire and the Great Divisions of the Globe: Book II for Standard III (1882)
- The Counties of England: Book III for Standard IV (1881)
- The Countries of Europe Their Scenery and Peoples: Book IV for Standard V (1883)
- The Old and New World: Asia, Africa, America, Australia: Book V (1884)

She co-founded the Parents' National Educational Union (PNEU), an organisation that provided resources to parents educating their children at home. She launched and served as editor-in-chief at the Parents' Review to keep in touch with PEU members.

In 1890 she met Henrietta Franklin, in what others consider to be the "inspiring experience" of Franklin's life. By 1892 Franklin had opened the first school in London based on Mason's principles. In 1894 Franklin became the secretary of the renamed Parents' National Educational Union and she undertook speaking tours to major cities in America, Europe and South Africa. She devoted her own money to the cause and wrote on its behalf. Franklin's biography cites that the PNEU's continued operations is down to her.

== Career ==
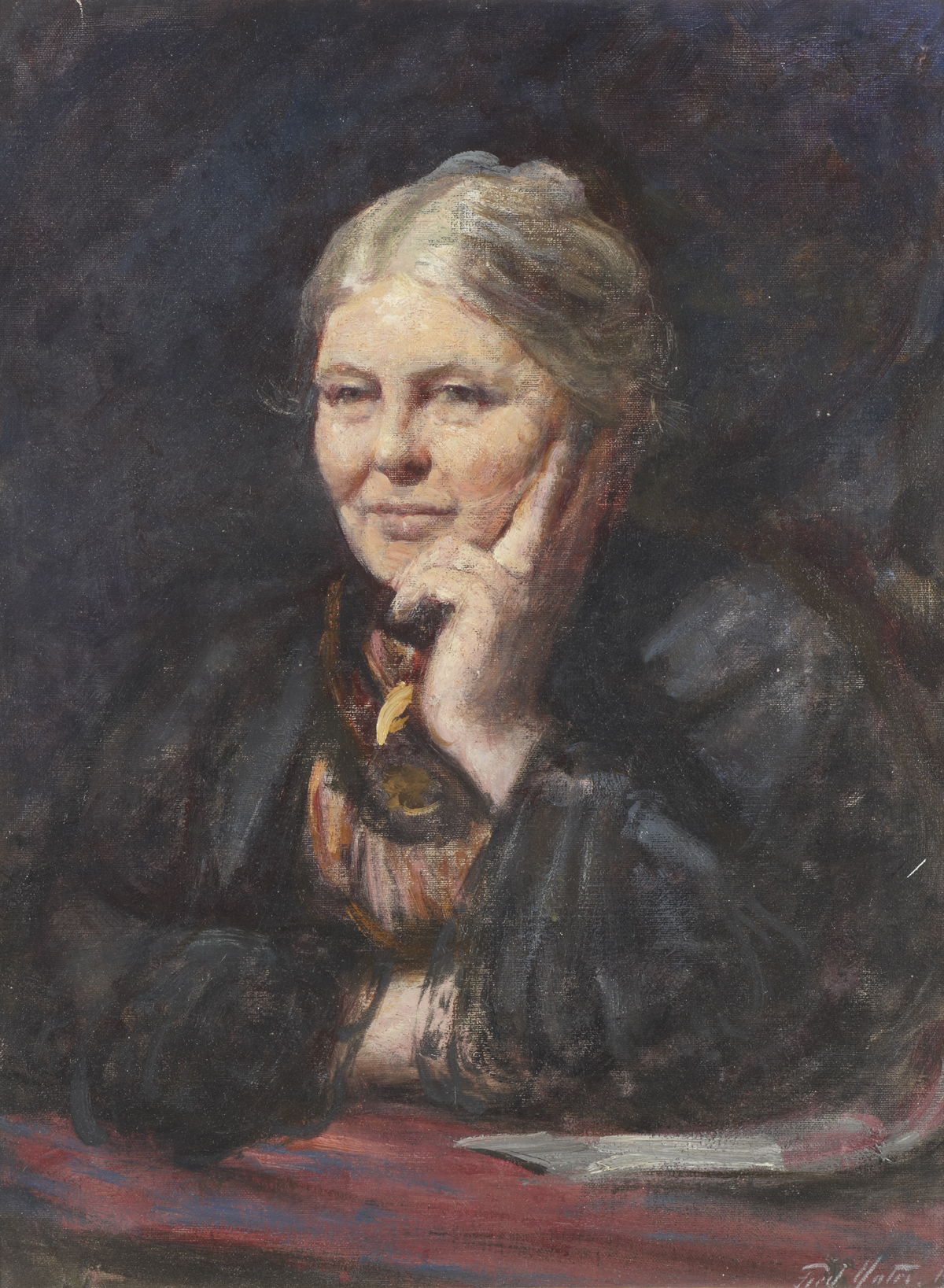
Charlotte Mason - painted in 1902 by Frederic Yates

Mason moved to Ambleside, England, in 1891 and established the House of Education, a training school for governesses and others working with young children. By 1892, the Parents' Educational Union had added the word "National" to its title to become the Parents' National Educational Union (PNEU). A Parents' Review School had been formed (later to be known as the Parents' Union School), at which the children were taught according to Mason's educational philosophy and methods.

Mason wrote and published several other books developing and explaining her theories of education:

- Parents and Children: Parents and Children is a collection of her articles and essays previously published in various sources.
- School Education: outlines her methods for educating children from approximately age 9 to 12.
- Ourselves, was also published in 1904. In it, Mason addressed herself directly to the children, or for parents to read aloud with their children, to help them learn to examine themselves and develop high moral standards and self-control. The first part is for children under age 16. Book two of Ourselves is written for students over 16.
- Formation of Character, published the following year, in 1905, was developed from a revision of earlier volumes. Mason explained in the preface to volume 5 (Formation of Character) that "In editing Home Education and Parents and Children for the 'Home Education' Series, the introduction of much new matter made it necessary to transfer a considerable part of the contents of those two members of the series to this volume, Some Studies in the Formation of Character." Her purpose with this volume, she said, was to demonstrate how her methods should assist children to naturally develop and strengthen good character traits.

"We may not make character our conscious objective," she wrote, but she believed that parents and teachers should "Provide a child with what he needs in the way of instruction, opportunity, and wholesome occupation, and his character will take care of itself: for normal children are persons of good will, with honest desires toward right thinking and right living. All we can do further is to help a child to get rid of some hindrance––a bad temper, for example––likely to spoil his life."

Mason's last book, Towards A Philosophy of Education was published in 1923, nearly forty years after her first book. It is written primarily to address the application of her methods and principles with high school students, but she also revised a summary of her principles, and in some cases revises and refines what she had written in previous volumes. Many home educators who read her volumes recommend starting with volume 6.

In addition to the geography series and her six volumes on education, Mason also wrote and published a six-volume work called The Saviour of the World (published between 1908–14), a study in verse of the life and teaching of Jesus.

Over the years between the publication of volumes 1 and 6 of her education series, other schools adopted her philosophy and methods. The Ambleside establishment became a teacher training college to supply all the Parents' Union Schools that were springing up, as well as to assist with correspondence programs provided for British parents living overseas and educating their children. The school trained young women according to Mason's methods in both homes and schools. Mason spent her final years overseeing this network of schools devoted to "a liberal education for all."

After her death, the training school was developed as Charlotte Mason College and was run by the Cumbrian Local Education Authority. In the 1990s, due to financial pressure, it became the tenth college of Lancaster University. An unfavourable Ofsted report four years later led to a merger with St Martin's College, and it became the Ambleside campus of St Martin's College.

The buildings now form part of the University of Cumbria and a health centre. There is also a museum attached. In March 2008, the University announced plans to end teacher training in Ambleside, and to develop the campus for postgraduate work and a conference centre.

== Educational philosophy ==
Mason's philosophy of education is probably best summarised by the principles given at the beginning of each book mentioned above. Two key mottos taken from those principles are "Education is an atmosphere, a discipline, a life" and "Education is the science of relations." She believed that children were born persons and should be respected as such; they should also be taught the Way of the Will and the Way of Reason. Her motto for students was "I am, I can, I ought, I will." According to Mason, children have a natural love for learning and she devised strategies that facilitated this through the creation of a positive learning atmosphere. She believed that children should be fed upon the best ideas, which she called 'mind-food.' She believed even the youngest children should be given 'ideas, clothed upon with facts' as they occur, inspiring tales, and worthy thoughts. Her approach is child-centred and is focused on liberal arts. It also emphasizes more on concepts (ideas) than on facts. Today, one can find Charlotte Mason inspired homeschool curriculums in many subject areas including maths and science.

Mason placed great emphasis on the reading of high-quality literature, and coined the phrase "living books" to denote those writings that "spark the imagination of the child through the subject matter."

== Scouting ==
Charlotte Mason was the first person to perceive the educational potential of Scouting applied to children. In April 1905, she added Aids to Scouting by Robert Baden-Powell to the syllabus of the Parents' Union School. Later, Baden-Powell credited a governess trained by Mason, coupled with the reputation of Mason herself, for suggesting the educational possibilities of Scouting. This, amongst other influences, led to Scouting for Boys and the formation of the Scouting movement.

Mason and her teachers organised the Parents' Union Scouts for boys and girls around the country, both those educated at home and those at schools using the P.N.EU system (date?). When the Girl Guides were established, Mason suggested that the P.U. Scouts amalgamate with national organisations for boys and girls respectively.

== Publications ==
Charlotte wrote several books in the latter portion of her life, mainly on the subjects Education & Geography.

- Home Education Series - Vol 1, Home Education
- Home Education Series - Vol 2, Parents and Children
- Home Education Series - Vol 3, School Education
- Home Education Series - Vol 4, Ourselves
- Home Education Series - Vol 5, Formation of Character
- Home Education Series - Vol 6, Towards a Philosophy of Education
- Elementary Geography
- An Essay Towards a Philosophy of Education: A Liberal Education for All
- Home education
- Parents and children
- Poetry: The Savior of the World
- Scale How Meditations
- Parents' Review Articles Archive

== Mason vs. modern Classical Education ==
- Some versions of the Classical education movement put less emphasis on the fine arts, especially visual art, although other classical Christian educators like George Grant, draw heavily from the insights of both Charlotte Mason and Dorothy L. Sayers.
- Classical Education may sometimes be described as rigorous and systematic, separating children and their learning into three rigid categories, Grammar, Dialectic, and Rhetoric. Charlotte Mason believed that all children are born as full persons, and should be educated on real ideas, through their natural environment, the training of good habits, and exposure to living ideas and concepts from the beginning.
- Classical Education often will introduce writing composition earlier and teaches it as a separate subject, while Mason depends on oral narration and a smooth transition into written narration in later grades without studying composition as a separate subject until the upper years.
- Classical Education introduces formal grammar at an earlier age than Mason does. She believed in beginning grammar lessons with whole sentences rather than parts of speech.
- Classical Education allows more parental explanations and distilling of information than Mason does.
- The version of classical education developed by Dorothy L. Sayers relies heavily on rote memorisation for young children. Mason's students memorised scripture, poetry, and songs, but she did not value rote memorisation for the sake of rote memory. She believed that children should be fed upon the best ideas, which she called 'mind-food.' She believed even the youngest children should be given 'ideas, clothed upon with facts' as they occur, inspiring tales, and worthy thoughts.
- The Classical Education approach in The Well Trained Mind relies on abridged books and simplified version of the classics for younger children; this version of Classical Education terms this period as 'the Grammar Stage'. Mason believed that children should be introduced to subjects through living books, not through the use of "compendiums, abstracts, or selections." She used abridged books only when some of the content was deemed inappropriate for children. She preferred that parents or teachers read aloud those texts (such as Plutarch and the Old Testament), making omissions only where necessary.

== Sources ==
- Andreola, Karen (1994). "The Charlotte Mason Method". Practical Homeschooling Magazine. Archived from the original on 15 April 2006.
- Bell, Debra (2005). The Ultimate Guide to Homeschooling (3rd ed.). Tommy Nelson. ISBN 1-4003-0566-7.
- Cholmondley, Essex (1960). The Story of Charlotte Mason, 1842–1923.
- Gardner, Penny (1997). Charlotte Mason Study Guide (1st ed.). SunRise Publishing. ISBN 1-57636-039-3.
- Griffith, Mary (1999). The Homeschooling Handbook (Revised 2nd ed.). Three Rivers Press. ISBN 0-7615-1727-8.
- Kerr, Rose (1976). Story of the Girl Guides 1908–1938. London: Girl Guides Association.
- Levison, Catherine (1997). A Charlotte Mason Education (2nd Printing ed.). Charlotte Mason Communique-tions. ISBN 0-9655044-0-9.
- Macaulay, Susan Schaeffer (2009). For the Children's Sake: Foundations of Education for Home and School (revised and updated from the 1984 ed.). Crossway Books. ISBN 978-1-4335-0695-6.
- "The ABC's of Charlotte Mason". Archived from the original on 4 April 2006.
- "What is the difference between the Charlotte Mason approach and the Classical approach?".
- "What methods did Charlotte Mason use?".
- "The Original Homeschooling Series by Charlotte M. Mason".
- "Ambleside Online Parents' Review Article Archive".
- "Ambleside Online Frequently Asked Questions".
- "The Classical Side of Charlotte Mason by Karen Glass". Archived from the original on 18 August 2010.
- "Classical Education and Four Year Cycles by Karen Glass".
