= Mary Louisa Armitt =

American librarian and author

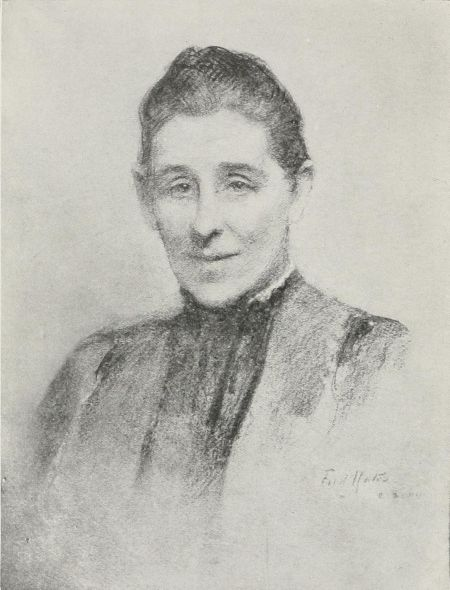
- portrait by Frederic Yates
- Born: 31 July 1851; Salford, Lancashire, England
- Died: 24 September 1911 (aged 60); Rydal, Cumbria, England
- Education: Manchester Mechanics' Institute

Mary Louisa Armitt (31 July 1851 – 24 September 1911) was an English polymath. She was a teacher, writer, ornithologist and philanthropist. She was the funder and founder of the Armitt Library, Ambleside.

== Life ==
Armitt was born in Salford, Lancashire in 1851. She was one of three gifted daughters who were born to William and Mary Ann Armitt (née Whalley). All three girls wrote, and they all attended Islington House Academy, but each specialised in a different subject. This academy was in Salford and it trained people to teach along Pestalozzian principles. Sophia, who was born in 1847, took botany and art while her younger sister Annie Maria, who was born in 1850, studied English literature. Mary—who was known as Louie—was the youngest and excelled at music and natural history. She was educated at the Mechanics' Institute in Manchester as soon as she was of age.

The three sisters were all teenagers when their father died. They were well educated so they established a school at Eccles in Lancashire. The eldest child at the school was fourteen, which was only a year younger than Armitt. The three girls spent their spare time attending recitals, art exhibitions, and lectures. They wrote, sketched, and discussed natural history at meetings. Armitt and Sophie both discussed their ambitions with John Ruskin, who encouraged Sophie to study art but told Armitt not to write but to devote herself to women's activities. Luckily Armitt eventually ignored Ruskin's advice and began regular contributions to the Manchester City News in 1877. She was assisted in her studies by a scholarship from Trinity College, Cambridge and by becoming a reader at the Bodleian Library in Oxford.

One of Armitt's notable areas of study was music. She wrote a number of articles on the history of music and also was a music critic for the Manchester City News.

In 1886, Armitt and Sophie retired to Hawkshead, near where Annie was already living, and continued their cultural interests, talking to artists, writers and educationalists like Charlotte Mason and Frances Arnold. Mason, who ran a school for governesses, was publishing the Parents Review, and Mary contributed articles for it. By 1894 Annie was a widow and had moved in with her sisters and Armitt was so ill with heart trouble that she was prevented from travelling far. She mitigated this by joining the London Library. In 1897 she published Studies of Lakeland Birds, a book that gathered together articles from the Westmorland Gazette.

== Death and legacy ==
Armitt died in Rydal in 1911 and was buried in Ambleside. By then, her library included two earlier collections dating from 1828 and 1882. The latter was John Ruskin's Ambleside library, and the former was an early collection from the Ambleside Book Club, to which William Wordsworth had been a subscriber. The Armitt Library was officially opened in 1912. On 8 November 1912 a friend of the Armitts', Canon Hardwicke Rawnsley, who was to co-found the National Trust, read his poem in celebration. The poem starts:

As in some inland solitude a shell
Still gently whispers of its home, the deep,
So from the world of being beyond all sleep
Where those two happy sister spirits dwell...

The "two happy sister spirits" were Armitt, who had died the year before, and Sophie, who had died in 1908.

In 1912, Armitt's history of Grasmere Church was published posthumously.

In 1916, Willingham Franklin Rawnsley finished editing Armitt's notes on local history, which she had partially researched at Rydal Hall.
