= Annie Armitt =

English writer and poet

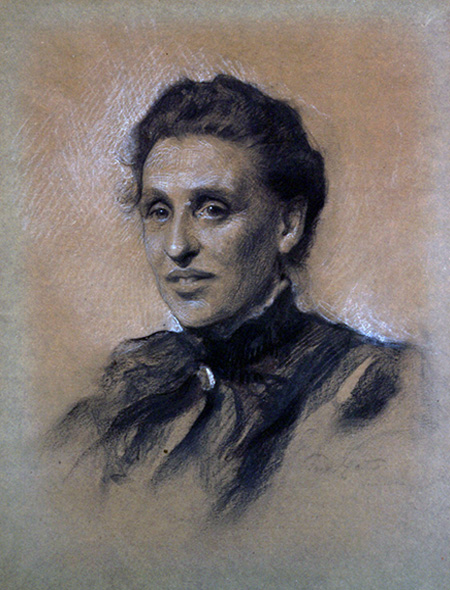
- Born: Annie Maria Armitt; 1850
- Died: 1933 (aged 82–83)
- Other names: A.M. Harris, Annie M. Harris
- Spouse: Stanford Harris

Annie Armitt (1850 – 30 November 1933) was an English novelist, poet, short story writer, and essayist. She was also one of the founders of a school in Eccles, England.

== Early years ==
Annie Maria Armitt was born in Salford, England, in 1850. She was the middle of three gifted daughters of William and Mary Ann (Whalley) Armitt.

The sisters were all well educated. Armitt, who knew from an early age that she wanted to be a writer, studied English literature at Islington House Academy in Salford, which trained people to teach according to the Pestalozzian principles. Her older sister Sophie took to botany and would later become a nature writer. Her younger sister Mary Louisa (known as Louie) excelled at music and natural history. She later wrote (mainly for periodicals) on topics ranging from ornithology to local history.

== Founding a school ==
Armitt travelled to Paris in 1866 with Sophie to study French, but the following year her father died unexpectedly and she returned to England. Armitt and her sisters then established a school in Eccles, Lancashire.

In 1877, Armitt married Stanford Harris, a physician. The couple went to live near Hawkshead, but neither of them was well and the marriage was unhappy.

== Literary work ==
Armitt published her first novel, The Garden at Monkholme, in 1878. It was critically well received, with The Westminster Review praising it as "a new departure in fiction" for its focus on characters who were unattractive and for Armitt's ability to make drama out of commonplace events. Similarly, The Scottish Review admired it for Armitt's outstanding depiction of character. Her 1885 novel In Shallow Waters was praised for its compelling depiction of the self-sacrificing protagonist, Henry Dilworth. An excerpt from this novel gives a sense of Armitt's dry, Austenian style at its best:

"She did not admire clever girls, and was never enthusiastic in her praise of good ones—those at least, who were specially marked out as such by their parochial visitations and love of week-day services...She was inclined to insinuate that any one who made a very visible application of herself to heavenly things must be drawn thereto by a lack of earthly prosperity."

Armitt also published poems, short stories, and essays including a brief life of Mary Shelley. The poet Robert Browning wrote that he was impressed by some of her poems.

== Old age ==
In 1882, Armitt's sisters came to live near Hawkshead in the town of Rydal, and after being widowed, Armitt joined them there in 1894. The sisters lived together until Sophie and Louie died in 1908 and 1911. Armitt survived her sisters by two decades, dying in 1933.

== Selected novels ==
- The Garden at Monkholme (1870)
- Man and His Relatives: A Question of Morality (1885)
- In Shallow Waters (1885)
