= Armitt Library =

Museum and library in Cumbria, England

Coordinates: 54.4343°N 2.9633°W

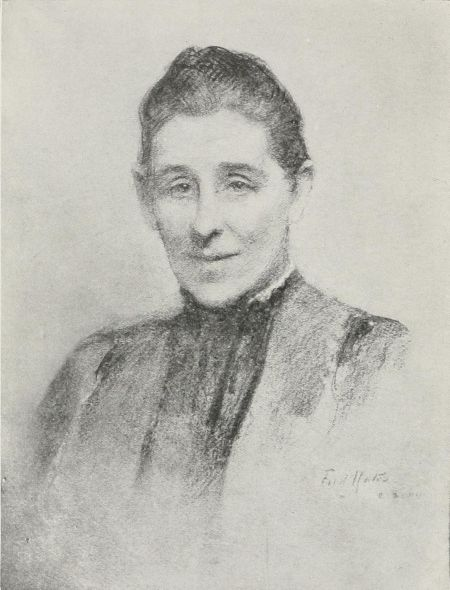
The library is named for Mary Louisa Armitt (picture by Frederic Yates)

The Armitt Museum, also known as the Armitt Museum and Library, is an independent museum and library, founded in Ambleside in Cumbria by Mary Louisa Armitt in 1909. It is a registered charity under English law.

== History ==
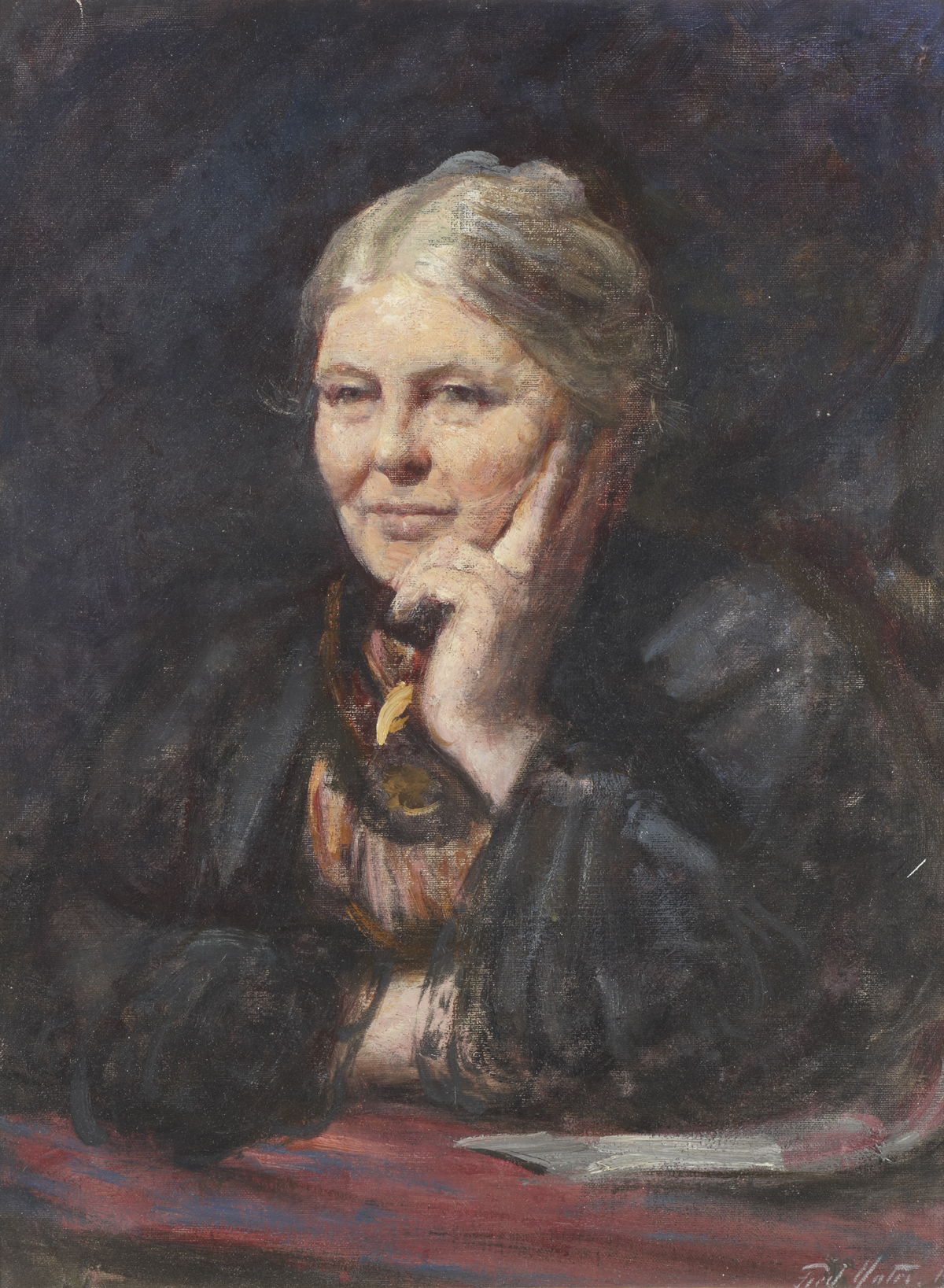
Charlotte Mason - painted in 1902 by Frederic Yates is a painting in the Library's collection

The library was founded by a bequest of Mary Louisa Armitt in order that the intellectual activity of Ambleside could be celebrated. The roots of the organisation go back to the Ambleside Book Society which was founded in 1828 and which formed part of the library. On 8 November 1912 the library opened and Hardwicke Rawnsley who was to co-found the National Trust wrote a poem in celebration. The poem starts:

As in some inland solitude a shell
Still gently whispers of its home, the deep,
So from the world of being beyond all sleep
Where those two happy sister spirits dwell...

The "two happy sister spirits" were Mary Louisa Armitt, who died the year before, and her sister Sophia Armitt.

Beatrix Potter donated books and paintings in her lifetime, and on her death bequeathed her portfolios of natural history watercolours and her personal copies of her "little books". These are on permanent display in an exhibition Beatrix Potter: Image and Reality.

The current building was constructed in 1997 from slate and stone on the land belonging to St Martin's College (formerly Charlotte Mason College).

The Armitt also houses a collection of works by Kurt Schwitters, a German refugee artist who lived and died in Ambleside.

The library of over 11,000 books covers the local and natural history of the Ambleside area and the wider Lake District. It is an important resource for information on notable people connected with the area, including Mary Louisa Armitt, William Wordsworth, Harriet Martineau, John Ruskin, Frederic Yates, Canon Hardwicke Rawnsley and Kurt Schwitters.

== See also ==
- List of museums in Cumbria
