= Ambleside =

Town in Cumbria, England

Coordinates: 54.430°N 2.963°W

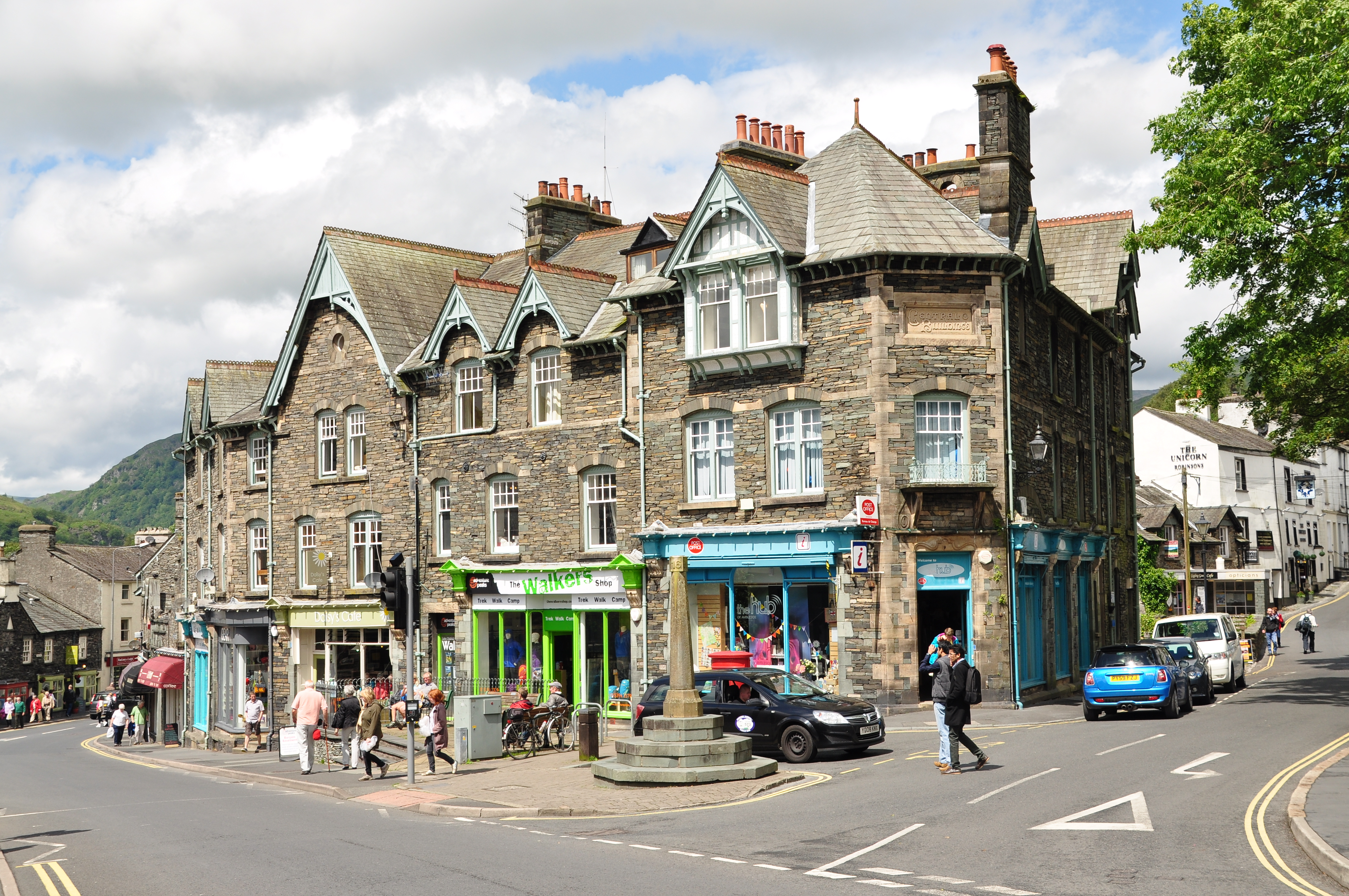
- Shops on Rydal Road in Ambleside town centre

- Location within Cumbria
- Area: 1.238 km^{2} (0.478 sq mi)
- Population: 2,586 (Built up area, 2022 estimate)
  - Density: 2,089/km^{2} (5,410/sq mi)
- OS grid reference: NY375037
- Civil parish: Lakes
- Unitary authority: Westmorland and Furness
- Ceremonial county: Cumbria
- Region: North West
- Country: England
- Sovereign state: United Kingdom
- Post town: Ambleside
- Postcode district: LA22
- Dialling code: 015394
- Police: Cumbria
- Fire: Cumbria
- Ambulance: North West
- UK Parliament: Westmorland and Lonsdale

Ambleside is a town in the civil parish of Lakes and the Westmorland and Furness district of Cumbria, England. Within the boundaries of the historic county of Westmorland and located in the Lake District National Park, the town sits at the head of Windermere, England's largest natural lake. In 2022 the built up area had an estimated population of 2,586.

== History ==
The town's name is derived from the Old Norse "Á-mel-sǽtr" which literally translates as "river – sandbank – summer pasture".

On the southern edge of Ambleside is the Roman fort of Galava, dating from AD 79.

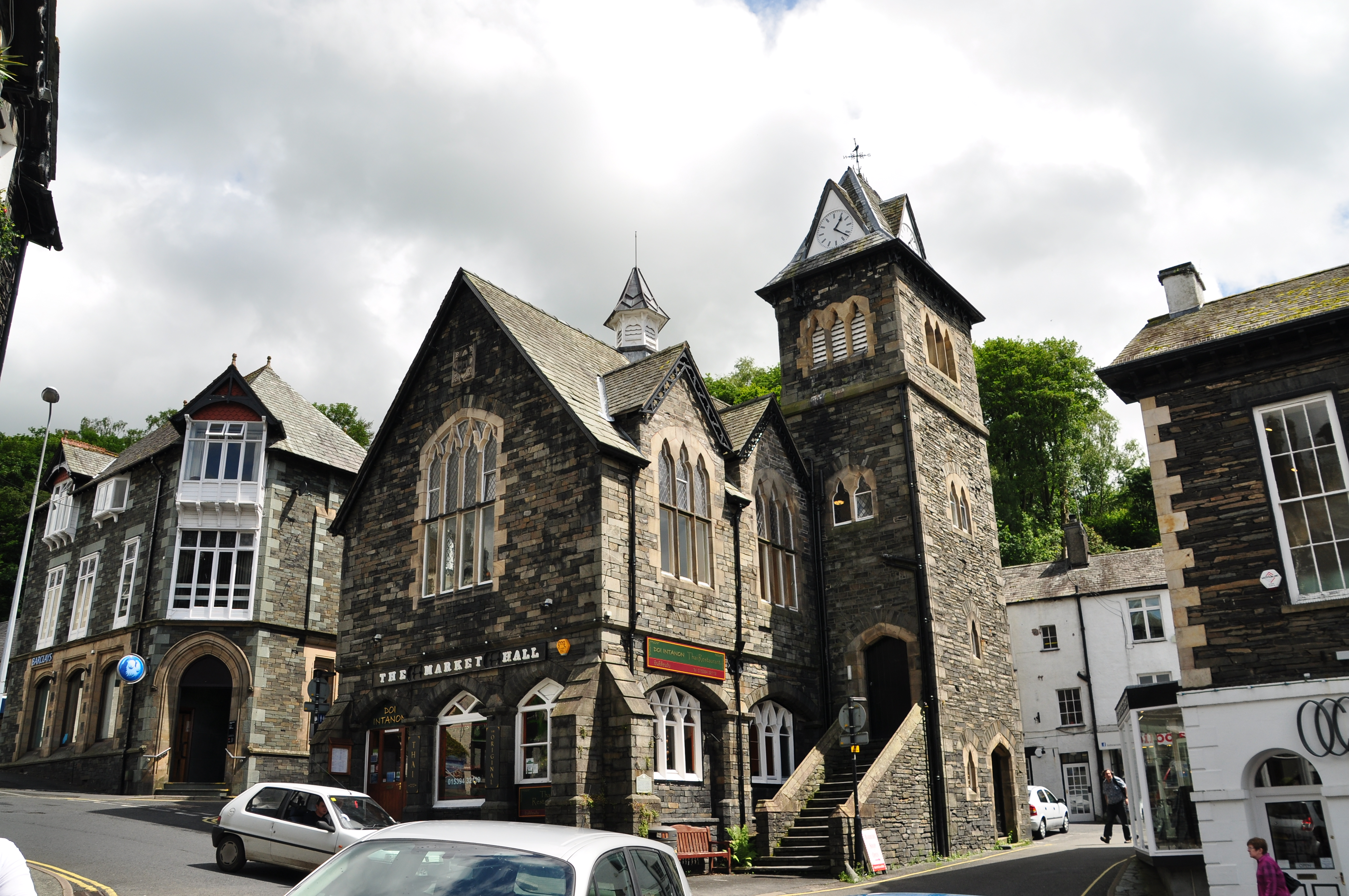
The Market Hall

In 1650 the town was granted a charter to hold a market. In the reign of James II, another charter was granted for the town to collect tolls. The town's Market Place became the commercial centre for agriculture and the wool trade. The old packhorse trail between Ambleside and Grasmere was the main route between the two towns before the new turnpike road was completed in 1770. Smithy Brow at the end of the trail was where pack ponies were re-shod after their journey. With the coming of the turnpikes, the packhorse trains were superseded by horse-drawn stagecoaches, which regularly travelled between Keswick and Kendal via Ambleside.

The Samling Hotel was built in the 1780s, then called the "Dove Nest".

Ambleside & District Golf Club founded in 1903 ended in the late 1950s; Windermere Golf Club is a few miles along the lake's east side.

The Armitt Library and Museum opened in 1912 in memory of Sophia and Mary Louisa Armitt is notable as a resource for history. Its main resident collection overviews Lake District artists and writers with display panels, photographs and copies of their key works, and some originals of minor works.

== Landmarks ==
=== Bridge House ===
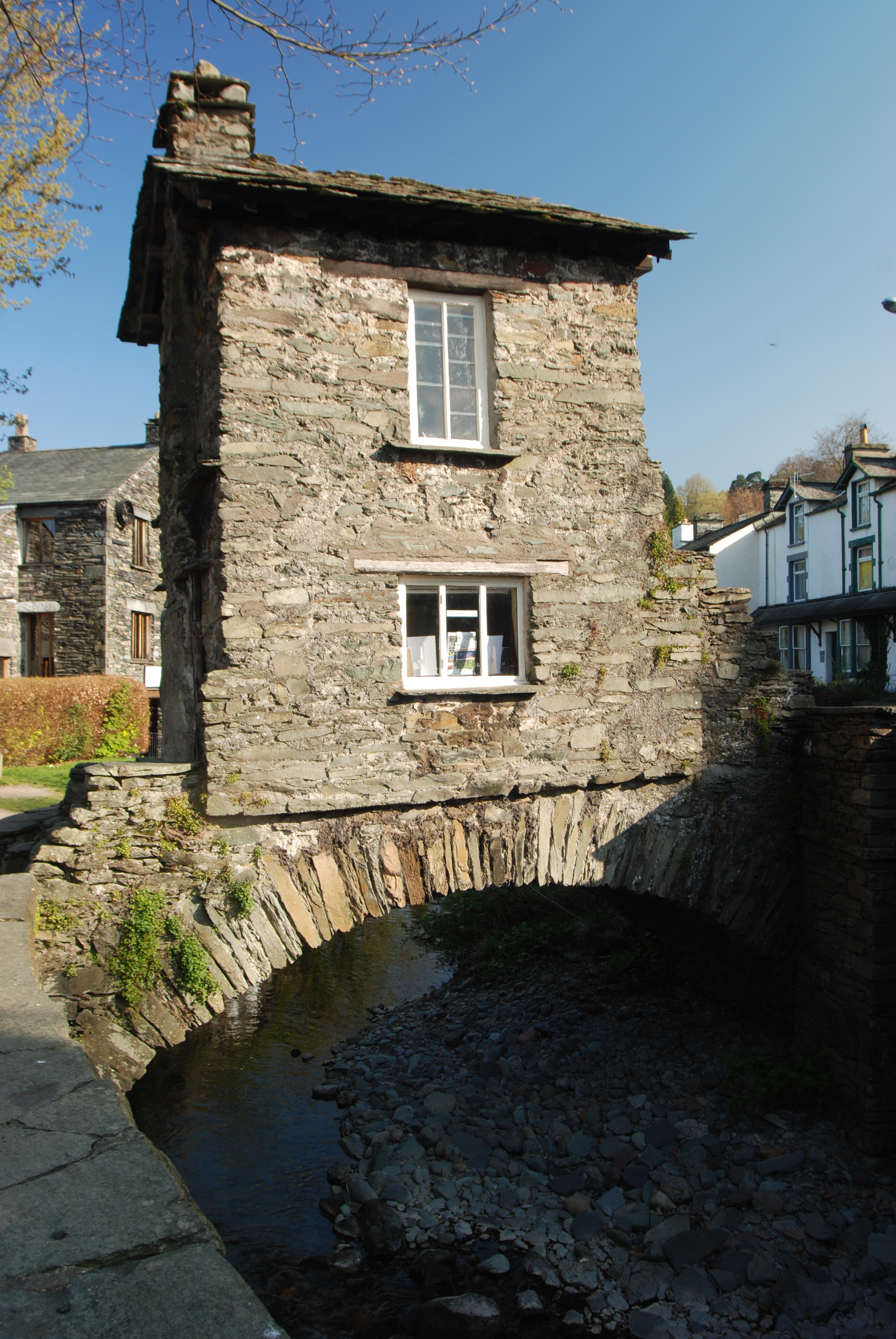
Bridge House in 2009

Bridge House was built over Stock Ghyll more than 300 years ago, probably as a summer house and apple store for Ambleside Hall. It subsequently had a range of different uses including being a counting house for the mills of Rattle Ghyll, a tea-room, weaving shop, cobbler's, chair maker's and, at one time, home to a family of eight. It was purchased by local people in 1926 and given to the National Trust. Listed Grade I, the building is now used as an information centre for the National Trust, and is part of the Trust's Windermere and Troutbeck property.

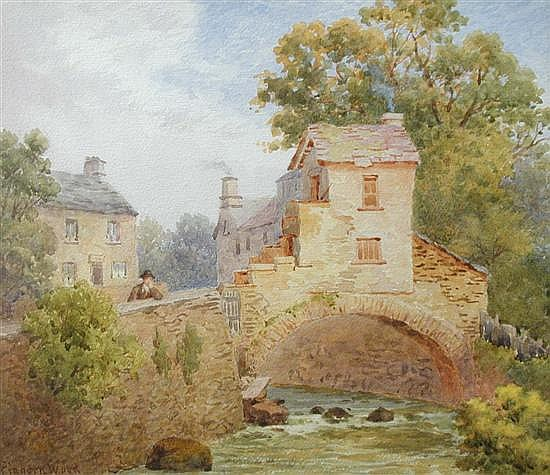
Lewis Pinhorn Wood's The Cobbler's Shop on the Bridge

The building was depicted by the Victorian landscapist Lewis Pinhorn Wood (1848–1918) in his late 19th century work The Cobbler's Shop on the Bridge and has been painted by a large number of artists including John Ruskin and JMW Turner.

=== St Mary's Church ===
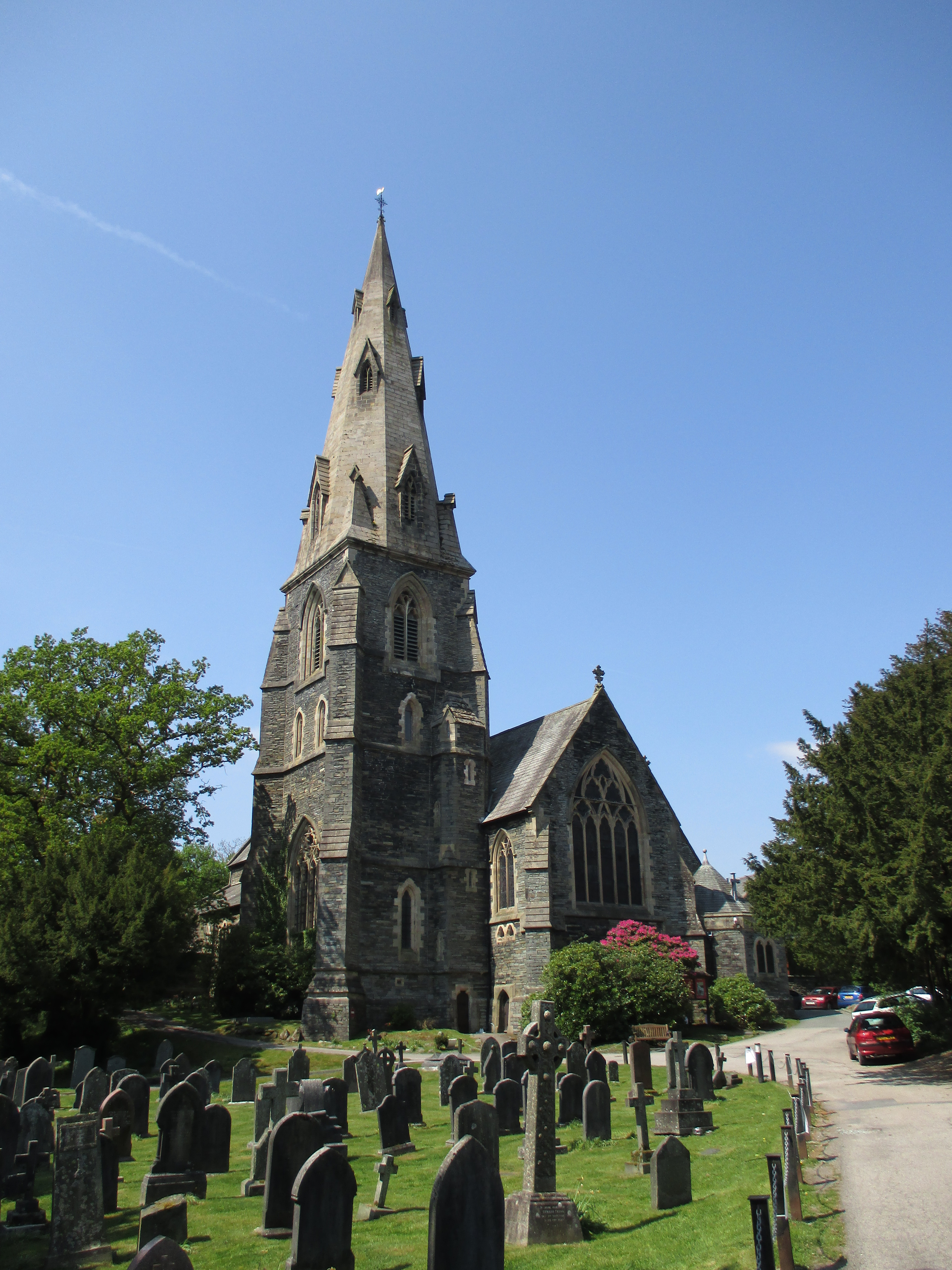
St Mary's Church

A shared Church of England and Methodist church. Before the 17th century the dead of Ambleside were buried at St Martin's Church, Bowness-on-Windermere, Ambleside then gained the right to its own registers and had a chapel dedicated to St Anne. This was too small to accommodate the enlarged Anglican congregations as tourism boomed from the Kendal and Windermere Railway opened in 1847. St Mary's Church was built in the 1850s to a design by George Gilbert Scott in the Gothic Revival style. Notable features include:

- the stone spire, an unusual feature in Westmorland churches,
- the mural depicting rushbearing (a ceremony which is held on the first Saturday in July). The mural was created during World War II when the Royal College of Art was based in Ambleside.

Early 20th century vicar Henry Adamson Thompson is depicted on the right of the mural. His body and that of his only son, Henry Lionel Francess Thompson – killed in World War II – share the same part of the churchyard.

Other burials include Annie, Sophia and Mary Louisa Armitt.

=== Mater Amabilis church ===
The town's many decades-old Catholic Church in a traditional design is a consolidation of two churches; until 2013 nearby Grasmere held services, whose reverend, Kevan Dorgan of Windermere, was translated to the consolidated parish. His predecessor, who retired, was David Duanne.

== Economy ==
=== Tourist amenities ===
"Steamers" are the throwback name for the ferries (diesel-propelled) which run most days to Bowness-on-Windermere and Lakeside offering fine views of the lake and the mountains.

Ambleside is a base for hiking, mountaineering and mountain biking. It has several hotels, guest houses, restaurants and shops. Specialist shops sell equipment, guides and give recommendations to walkers, backpackers and climbers. Ambleside is a popular starting point for the Fairfield horseshoe, a hillwalking ridge hike.

A concentration of ten pubs or bars within a quarter-mile radius reflects how the local hospitality market serves residents, tourists, visitors and the student population associated with the University of Cumbria.

Ambleside is also home to two Michelin-starred restaurants, Lake Road Kitchen and The Old Stamp House, both of which have been recognised for their innovative tasting menus.

== Governance ==
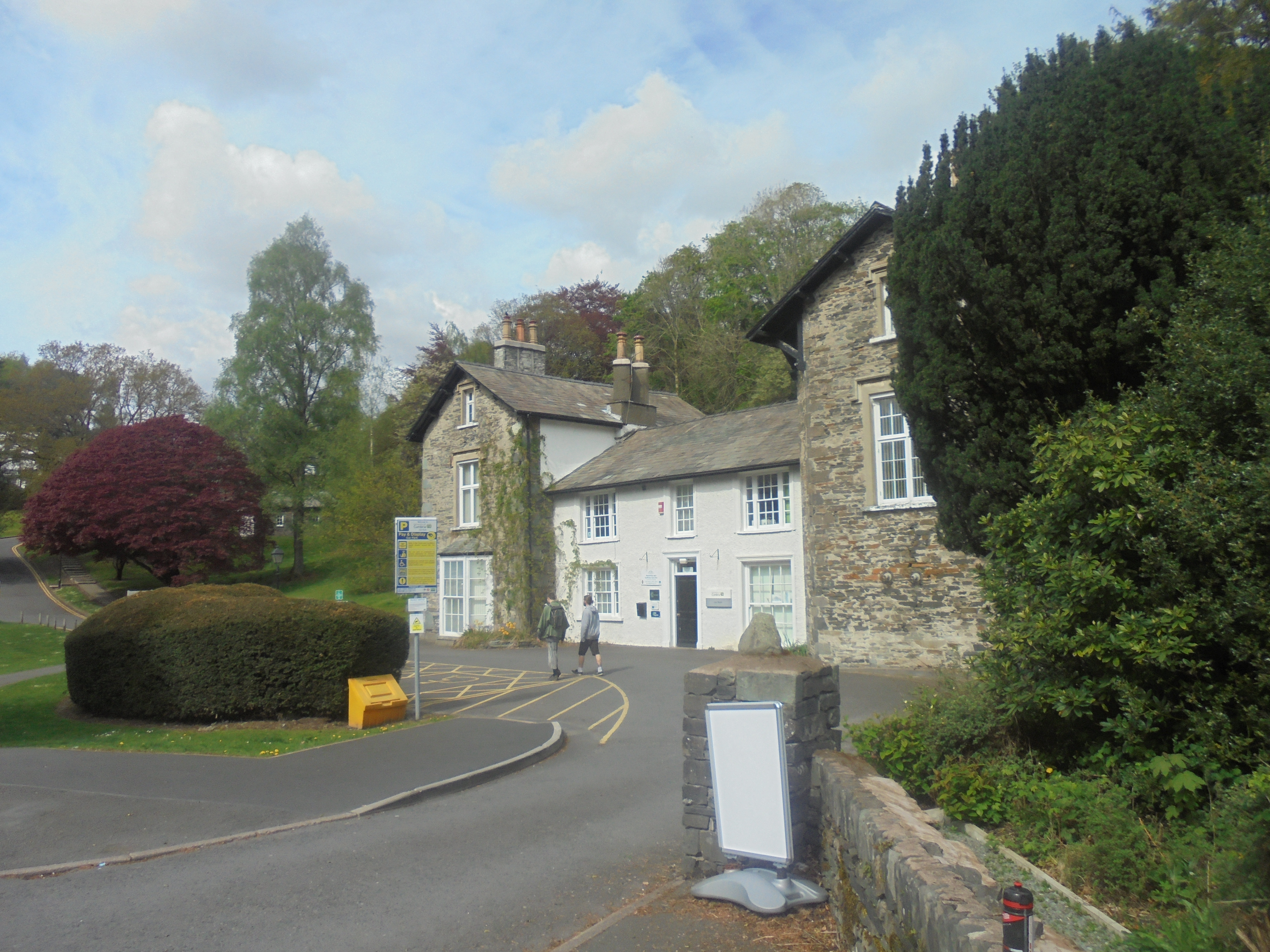
Low Nook, Rydal Road

Ambleside is the main settlement within the civil parish of Lakes. There are two tiers of local government covering Lakes, at parish and unitary authority level: Lakes Parish Council and Westmorland and Furness Council. The parish council is based at Low Nook on Rydal Road, on the University of Cumbria's Ambleside campus. The parish is wholly within the Lake District National Park, and so some functions are administered by the Lake District National Park Authority, notably planning.

For national elections, Ambleside is within the Westmorland and Lonsdale constituency.

=== Administrative history ===
Ambleside was historically a township in the ancient parish of Kendal in the historic county of Westmorland. After the Reformation in the 16th century, the very large parish of Kendal was subdivided into smaller parishes, and Ambleside township thereafter straddled the parishes of Grasmere and Windermere. The boundary between the two new parishes followed the stream of Stock Ghyll through the middle of Ambleside.

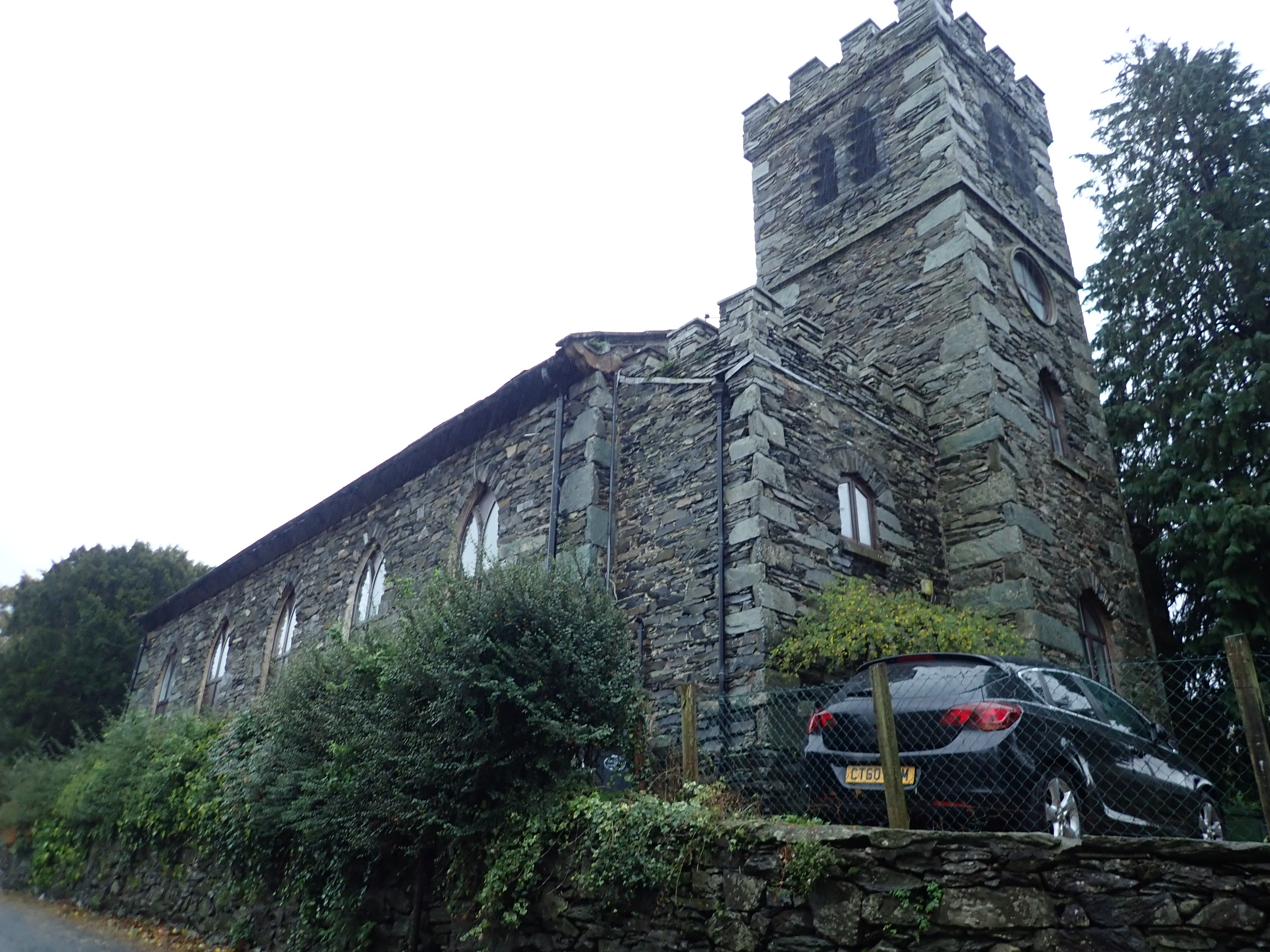
Former St Anne's Church

The township of Ambleside took on civil functions under the poor laws from the 17th century onwards. As such, the township also became a civil parish in 1866, when the legal definition of 'parish' was changed to be the areas used for administering the poor laws. In ecclesiastical terms, Ambleside township was served by a chapel of ease dedicated to St Anne, which was rebuilt in 1812. St Anne's was replaced by a much larger church dedicated to St Mary on a new site west of the town centre, which was completed in 1854. The township of Ambleside was subsequently also made an ecclesiastical parish in 1863.

Ambleside was made a local government district in 1884, administered by an elected local board. Such districts were reconstituted as urban districts under the Local Government Act 1894. Ambleside Urban District was abolished in 1935, when the area was merged with Grasmere Urban District and the civil parishes of Langdales, Patterdale, Rydal and Loughrigg, and Troutbeck to form Lakes Urban District. Ambleside was the largest settlement in the district and where the council was based. After the 1935 reforms, Ambleside continued to form a civil parish within Lakes Urban District between 1935 and 1974, but as an urban parish it had no separate council. At the 1961 census (one of the last before the abolition of the parish), Ambleside had a population of 2562.

Lakes Urban District was abolished in 1974. Patterdale was transferred to Eden District, and the remainder of the old Lakes Urban District, including Ambleside, became a successor parish called Lakes within the South Lakeland district of the new county of Cumbria. South Lakeland was in turn abolished in 2023 when the new Westmorland and Furness Council was created, also taking over the functions of the abolished Cumbria County Council in the area.

== Education ==
=== University of Cumbria ===
The Ambleside campus of the University of Cumbria, formerly St. Martin's College and Charlotte Mason College, is at the northern end of the town; courses held at the campus include Conservation, Forestry, and Outdoor Studies.

On 1 December 2009, it was announced that the Ambleside campus would be 'mothballed' at the end of July 2010, and would no longer take new undergraduate students. The closure was in the face of fierce opposition from the Ambleside students, the townspeople, and support pledged from Tim Farron, MP for the campus and its students.

In July 2011, the university announced a plan to reopen the campus and increase student numbers at the Ambleside campus beginning in 2014. In September 2014, the newly refurbished campus was reopened.

=== Exploration youth group ===
Brathay Exploration Group, a youth charity, mainly meets at associated Clappersgate.

== Waterhead locality ==
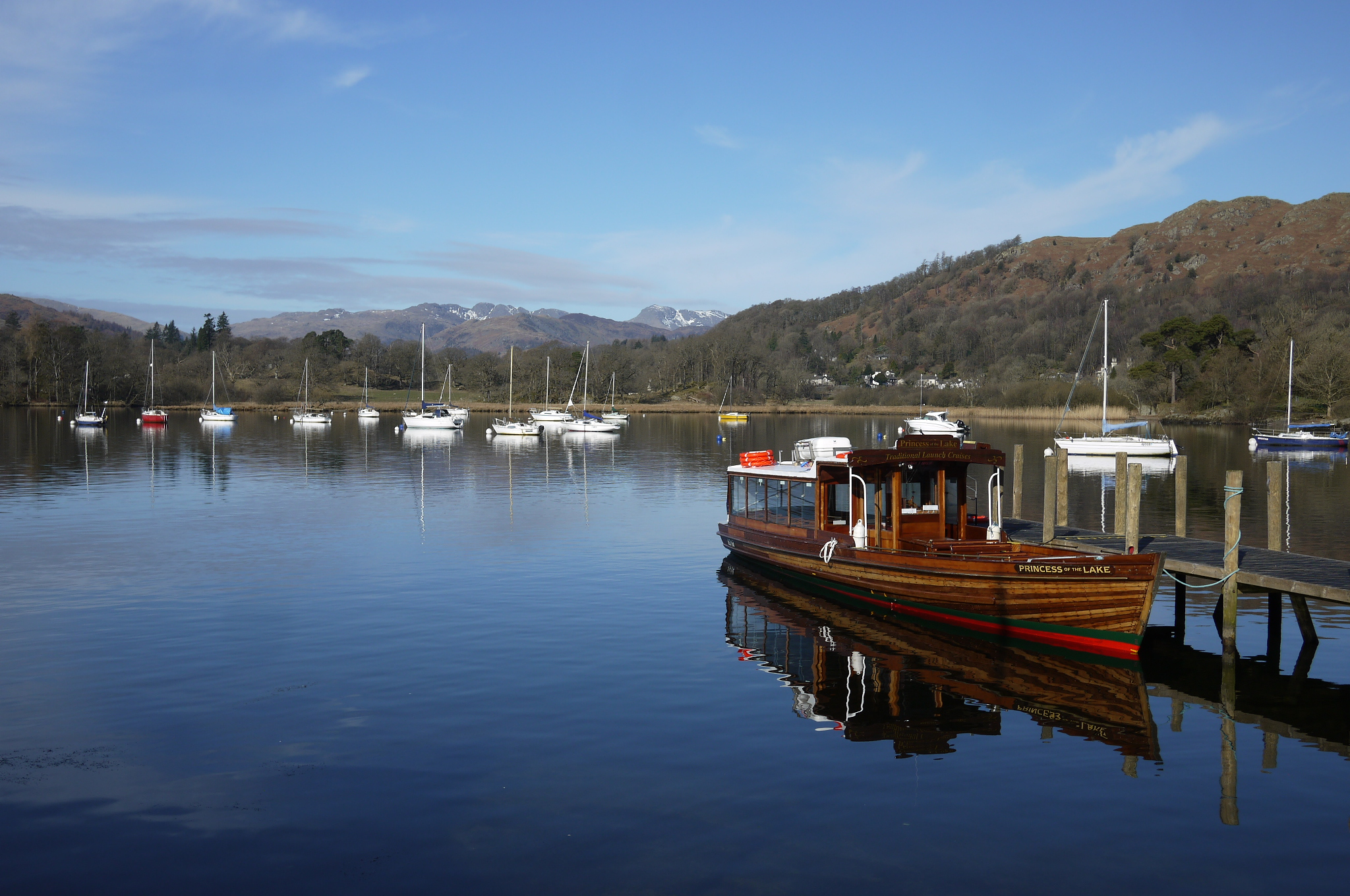
Boats at Waterhead Pier

Ambleside Pier at Waterhead, about one mile south of the town centre, is a boarding point for Windermere Lake Cruises on Windermere. Services run year-round connecting to Bowness-on-Windermere and Lakeside. Between March and October, a second service operates to the Brockhole Lake District Visitor Centre and Wray Castle.

Waterhead has hotels, cafés, boat hire establishments and the YHA youth hostel. It is mostly green buffered from the town, including by copses of mature trees.

== Media ==
Local news and television programmes are provided by BBC North West and ITV Border. Television signals are received from one of the two local relay TV transmitters (Windermere and Hawkshead).

Local radio stations are BBC Radio Cumbria, Heart North West, Smooth Lake District, and Lake District Radio that broadcast online from its studios in Kendal.

The town is served by the local newspapers, The Westmorland Gazette and North West Evening Mail.

== Notable residents ==
William Wordsworth worked in Ambleside, as Distributor of Stamps for Westmorland, from 1813, while living at Rydal Mount in the nearby village of Rydal. This government position induced Shelley to write a sonnet of mild reprimand, To Wordsworth, but it gave an income other than poetry. In 1842, he became the Poet Laureate and resigned his office.

In 1846 Harriet Martineau moved into her new house, "The Knoll", where she lived until her death in 1876. "Something of a Victorian superstar," she was a professional woman, international correspondent, ran a micro-farm on her property and formed and worked for a Property Association which helped working families in the neighborhood build their own homes. Her winter lectures packed the Methodist Church beside her home.

The author Mairin Mitchell (1895–1986) was born at Ambleside, the daughter of Dr Thomas Houghton Mitchell, a local GP.

Artist Kurt Schwitters was resident for 2 1/2 years until his death in January 1948. Under legislation to lower the risk of well-covered sympathiser spies he was interned in the Isle of Man for 14 months of World War II after fleeing Nazi Germany to Norway which was invaded in 1940; his release to London was secured with A. Dorner of Rhode Island School of Design's attestation and sponsorship.

Locomotive manufacturer Edward Bury (died 1858) and his wife Priscilla Susan.

The poet Dorothy Gurney wrote the words to the popular wedding hymn "O Perfect Love" at Pullwyke near Ambleside.

== Eponyms in fiction and music ==
- The Ambleside Alibi (part of series Lake District Mysteries), by Rebecca Tope, Allison & Busby
- Album CSI:Ambleside, by Birkenhead-based band Half Man Half Biscuit.

== Mountain rescue ==
The town maintains a Mountain Rescue England & Wales team, Langdale & Ambleside MRT, one of the busiest volunteer mountain rescue teams nationally.

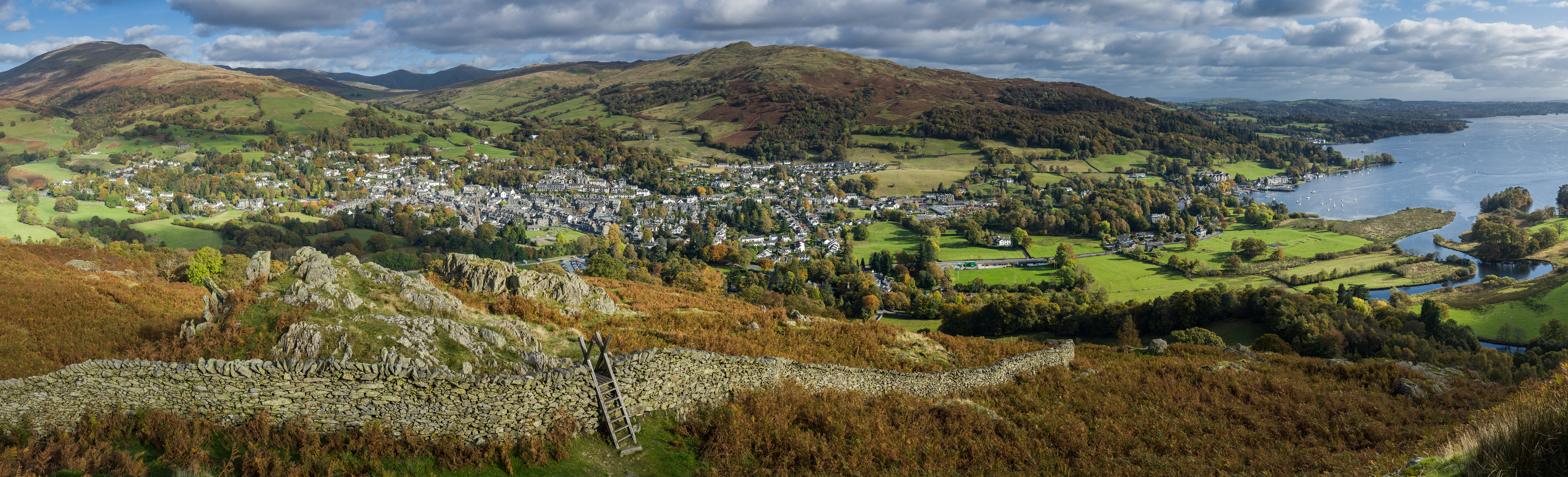
Ambleside (centre-left) and associated neighbourhood Waterhead (right) looking east from Loughrigg Fell

== Transport ==
Bus services from Ambleside are operated predominantly by Stagecoach Cumbria.

The nearest National Rail station is Windermere, which provides services to Oxenholme on the West Coast Main Line with some through services to Manchester Airport.

== Climate ==
Ambleside features an oceanic climate, but being within the Lake District it does experience higher annual rainfall than the average for the North-West of England. Parts of the town have been flooded on numerous occasions, with the River Rothay breaking its banks during Storm Desmond in December 2015.

Climate data for Ambleside (1991–2020)
Month	Jan	Feb	Mar	Apr	May	Jun	Jul	Aug	Sep	Oct	Nov	Dec	Year
Record high °C (°F)	11.1 (52.0)	13.9 (57.0)	21.1 (70.0)	20.6 (69.1)	25.6 (78.1)	30.0 (86.0)	27.8 (82.0)	28.9 (84.0)	27.8 (82.0)	22.8 (73.0)	15.6 (60.1)	12.2 (54.0)	30.0 (86.0)
Mean daily maximum °C (°F)	7.0 (44.6)	7.7 (45.9)	9.3 (48.7)	12.8 (55.0)	16.2 (61.2)	18.4 (65.1)	20.2 (68.4)	20.0 (68.0)	17.1 (62.8)	13.3 (55.9)	9.9 (49.8)	7.4 (45.3)	13.3 (55.9)
Daily mean °C (°F)	4.1 (39.4)	4.7 (40.5)	6.0 (42.8)	8.7 (47.7)	11.6 (52.9)	14.2 (57.6)	16.0 (60.8)	15.8 (60.4)	13.4 (56.1)	10.1 (50.2)	6.8 (44.2)	4.6 (40.3)	9.7 (49.5)
Mean daily minimum °C (°F)	1.2 (34.2)	1.7 (35.1)	2.6 (36.7)	4.5 (40.1)	7.0 (44.6)	10.0 (50.0)	11.8 (53.2)	11.7 (53.1)	9.6 (49.3)	6.8 (44.2)	3.8 (38.8)	1.9 (35.4)	6.1 (43.0)
Record low °C (°F)	−15.6 (3.9)	−13.3 (8.1)	−8.9 (16.0)	−5.6 (21.9)	−1.7 (28.9)	0.6 (33.1)	2.2 (36.0)	2.8 (37.0)	0.0 (32.0)	−3.3 (26.1)	−6.1 (21.0)	−13.3 (8.1)	−15.6 (3.9)
Average precipitation mm (inches)	235.3 (9.26)	205.3 (8.08)	157.9 (6.22)	101.4 (3.99)	100.8 (3.97)	118.3 (4.66)	128.9 (5.07)	157.8 (6.21)	162.8 (6.41)	224.3 (8.83)	236.2 (9.30)	274.0 (10.79)	2,102.9 (82.79)
Average precipitation days (≥ 1.0 mm)	18.9	14.6	16.1	12.7	12.4	11.6	12.8	14.7	14.0	18.9	18.3	16.0	180.9
Mean monthly sunshine hours	47.0	65.2	97.3	140.9	161.8	158.5	143.4	136.9	99.5	72.8	53.3	48.6	1,225.2
Source 1: Met Office (precipitation days 1981-2010)
Source 2: Starlings Roost Weather
