= Sophia Armitt =

British teacher, writer, and naturalist

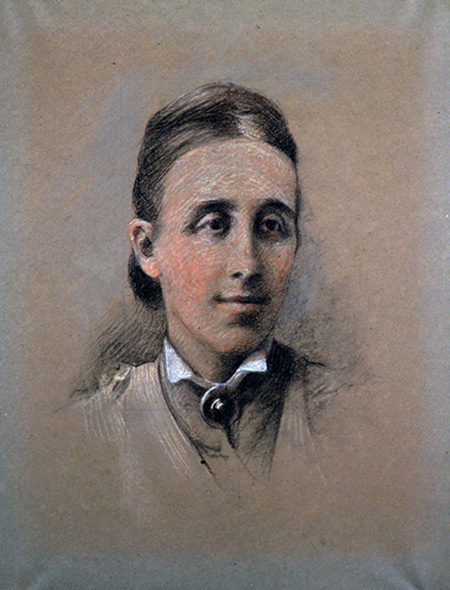
- Born: 1847; Salford, England
- Died: 12 June 1908 (aged 60–61)
- Education: Manchester School of Art
- Known for: Art and botany

Sophia Armitt (1847 – 12 June 1908) was a British teacher, writer, and naturalist.

== Life ==
Sophia Armitt was born in Salford in 1847, one of three gifted daughters of William and Mary Ann (Whalley) Armitt. All three girls wrote, and they all attended Islington House Academy, but each specialised in a different subject. Armitt took to botany and art, while her middle sister Annie Maria studied English literature and her youngest sister Mary Louisa was a polymath who excelled at music and natural history. Armitt's parents encouraged their daughters' education, and Armitt attended Manchester School of Art.

Armitt and Annie went to Paris in 1866 to study French, but the following year their father died without warning and they returned to Great Britain. They then established a school at Eccles in Lancashire and Armitt became the school's head teacher. The three women spent their spare time attending recitals, art exhibitions, and lectures. They also wrote and sketched and discussed natural history at meetings. Armitt and Mary both discussed their ambitions with John Ruskin, who told Mary to just do womanly things but encouraged Armitt to study art.

In 1882, Armitt and Mary received a legacy and retired together to Hawkshead; later, after being widowed, Annie joined them. They continued their cultural interests, talking to artists, writers, and educationalists like Charlotte Mason and Frances Arnold. Mason, who ran a school for governesses, published the Parents Review, for which Armitt wrote articles.

Armitt died in 1908.

== Works in The Parents Review ==
- "Irritability in Plants" (vol. 7, 1896, pp. 521–526)
- "Winter Buds" (vol. 8, no. 3, 1897, pp. 162–169)
- "Water Plants" (vol. 8, 1897, pp. 375–381)
- "Characteristic Forms of the Lake District Flora" (vol. 9. 1898, p. 780)
- "Seedless Reproduction of Seed Plants" (vol. 10, 1899, p. 98)
- "Nature Notes for April" (vol. 10, 1899, p. 251; with Mary Armitt)
- "Garden Gossip 2" (vol. 12, 1901, pp. 146–148)
- "Garden Gossip 3" (vol. 12, 1901, pp. 222–225)
- "Garden Gossip 4" (vol. 12, 1901, pp. 296–297)
- "Garden Gossip 5" (vol. 12, 1901, pp. 382–386)
- "Garden Gossip 6" (vol. 12, no. 9, 1901, pp. 459–462)
- "Garden Gossip 7" (vol. 12, 1901, pp. 715–717)
- "Garden Gossip 8" (vol. 12, no.9, 1901, pp. 814–816)
- "Garden Gossip 9" (vol. 12, no. 9, 1901, pp. 884–886)
- "Garden Gossip 10" (vol. 12, no. 9, 1901, pp. 965–967)
