= John Shaw (stone carver) =

British stone letter-carver

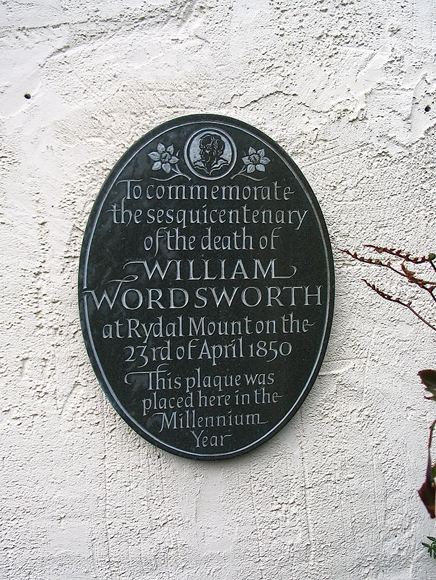
The plaque for the William Wordsworth Sesquicentenary, Rydal Mount, Cumbria, by John Shaw.

John Shaw, MA FRSA (b. 1952) is a British stone letter-carver, based in Saxby, Lincolnshire, England.

== Education ==
Shaw was educated at Derby College of Arts from 1970 to 1971 where he was the Earp Legacy Award winner. He graduated from Camberwell School of Art and Crafts, in 1974 with a BA in Fine Art. A PGCE followed from Brighton Polytechnic in 1975, and then an MA in 1983 from Birmingham Polytechnic. Shaw has had Workshop experience with Seán Crampton, David Kindersley and Ieuân Rees. He is also a member of the Art Workers Guild.

== Exhibitions ==
Shaw has had solo exhibitions in the Royal Society of Arts, Derby Museum and Art Gallery, Sam Scorer Gallery (Lincoln), Monnow Valley Arts Centre (Herefordshire), Harley Gallery and Foundation at Welbeck Abbey.

== List of works ==
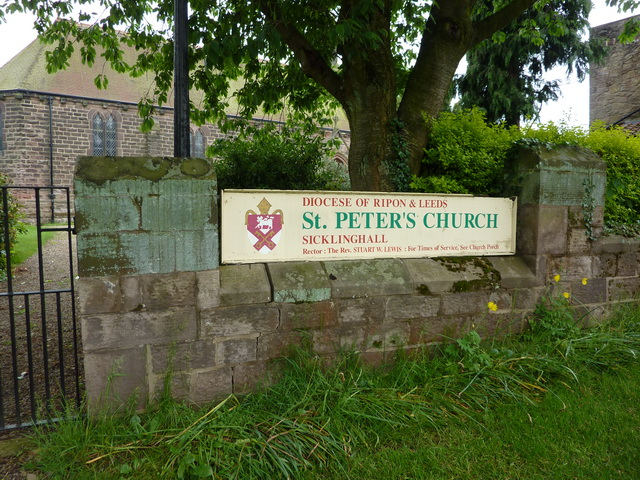
Sign for St Peter's Church, Sicklinghall.

- Sir Frank Whittle in Westminster Abbey
- Accrington Pals for St John’s Church Accrington
- Bishop John Robinson in Arncliffe, North Yorkshire
- Valley Parade Fire in Bradford Cathedral
- Fund Raisers in Bradford Cathedral
- Royal Maundy in Bradford Cathedral
- Pope John Paul II, St. Thomas More Church, Coventry
- Eighth Army, Dunkirk, Normandy Veterans in St. Peter’s Church, Derby
- Mayflower Pilgrims, Henlow, Hertfordshire
- J.B. Priestley in Hubberholme, North Yorkshire
- Foundation stone for West Yorkshire Playhouse
- Bishop Kenneth Skelton in Lichfield Cathedral
- Memorial to the Emergency Services, Commonwealth Games, Royal Maundy and Regimental Memorials in Manchester Cathedral
- Royal Arms for Manchester Law Courts
- Mary Potter Tomb in Nottingham Cathedral
- War memorials for St Wilfrid’s Church, Preston
- Preston Pals war memorial, Preston railway station
- Plaque for the William Wordsworth Sesquicentenary, Rydal Mount, Cumbria
- Burma Star memorial, Salisbury Cathedral
- War Memorial, St Helen's Church, Saxby, Lincolnshire
- Plaque for Lord Byron, Burgage Manor, Southwell, Nottinghamshire
- Memorial to Arthur Troop, Christ Church, Stamford, Lincolnshire
- Memorial to Tom Beastall, Tickhill Parish Church, South Yorkshire
- Memorial for the Dunkeswick Air Disaster, Weeton Parish Church, North Yorkshire
