= White Moss House =

Residence in the Lake District, England

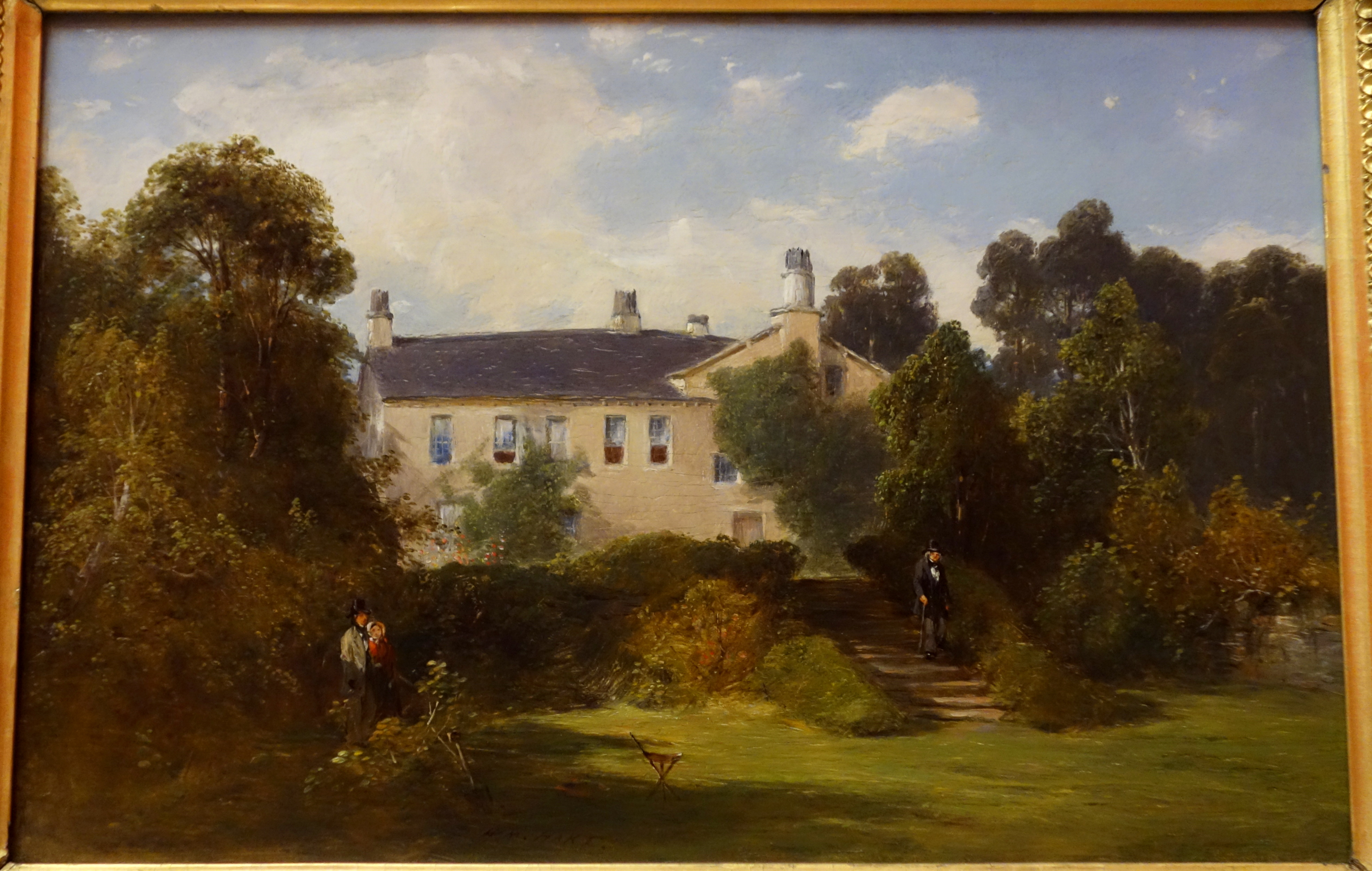
White Moss House by William Hart, 1852

White Moss House is situated at the north end of Rydal Water in the English Lake District.

William Wordsworth bought White Moss House when he moved from Dove Cottage in Grasmere to Rydal Mount.

Wordsworth rented all the houses that he lived in, and it was thought that he never owned a house, but Dove Cottage archives and the deeds for White Moss House, show that he bought this building for his son, Willie to live in.

Dorothy Wordsworth loved the White Moss area Journals of Dorothy Wordsworth and wrote about it extensively in her Grasmere Journals

The Wordsworth family expanded White Moss House from three miners cottages to a comfortable family home. The Wordsworth family lived there until the 1930s. The Dixon family have lived here for over 40 years.
