= Lida Lopes Cardozo Kindersley =

Lida Lopes Cardozo Kindersley MBE
- Born: 1954 (age 71–72); Leiden, Netherlands
- Education: Royal Academy of Art, The Hague
- Known for: Letter cutting
- Spouses: David Kindersley (m. 1986; died 1995) Graham Beck (m. 1998)
- Children: 3
- Website: https://www.kindersleyworkshop.co.uk/

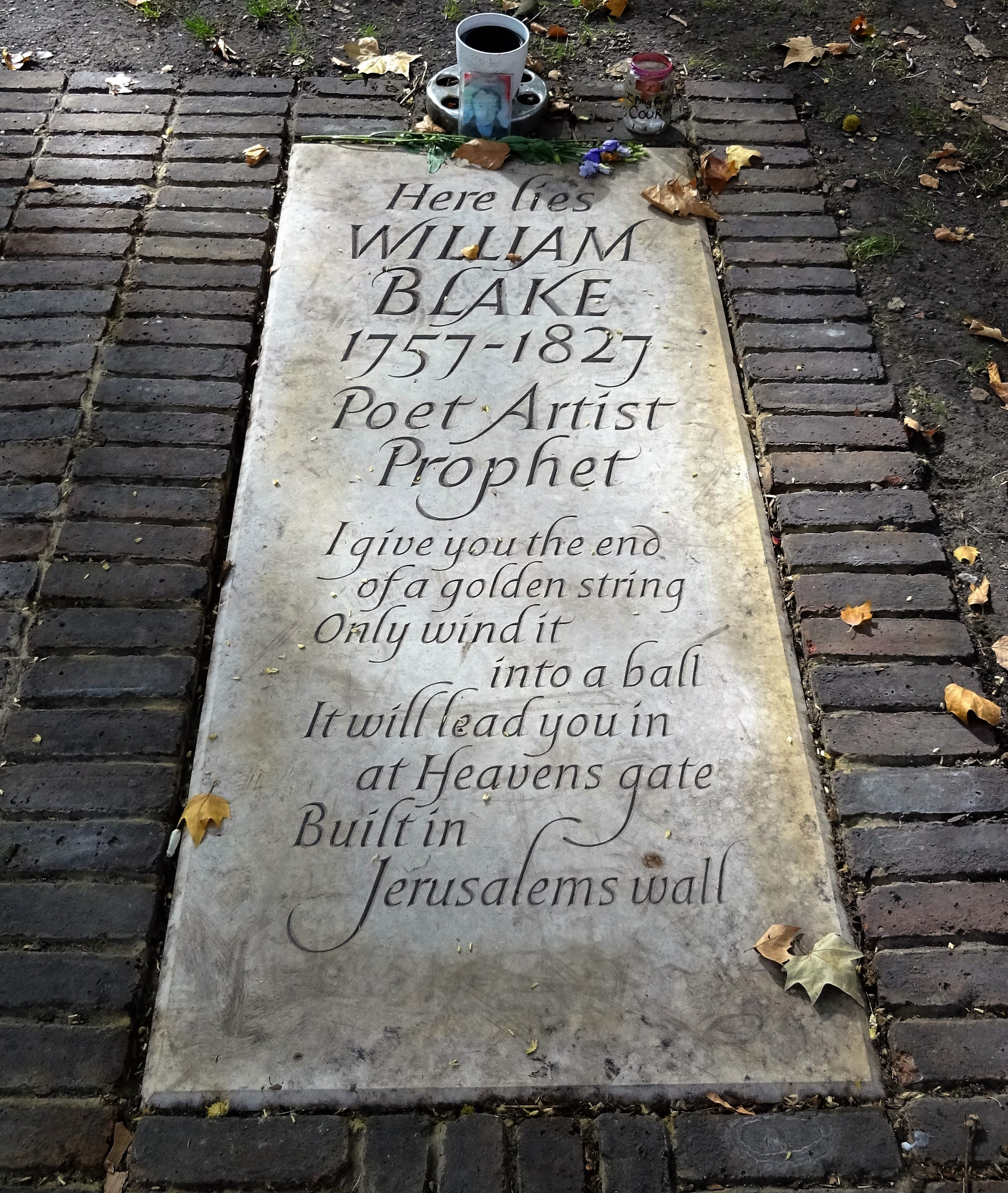
Ledger stone at William Blake's grave, Bunhill Fields, 2018

Lida Lopes Cardozo Kindersley MBE (born 1954), also known as Lida Lopes Cardozo and Lida Cardozo Kindersley, is a letter-cutter, typeface designer, author and publisher and runs the Cardozo Kindersley Workshop in Cambridge. She is considered the foremost letter-cutter currently working in the United Kingdom and is "dedicated to the increase of good lettering in the world". Her work in slate, stone and other media includes carved memorials, plaques, inscriptions and sundials which can be seen at many public locations in the United Kingdom and beyond. Her works include the ledger stone for the grave of William Blake at Bunhill Fields. With her first husband David Kindersley she also designed the main gates for the British Library.

== Early life and education ==
Lida Lopes Cardozo was born in 1954 in Leiden in The Netherlands. She graduated from the Royal Academy of Art, The Hague, in 1976 where she studied lettering with typographer and designer Gerrit Noordzij. It was in his classes that she realised that she wanted to create letters and work in carving stone.

== Career ==
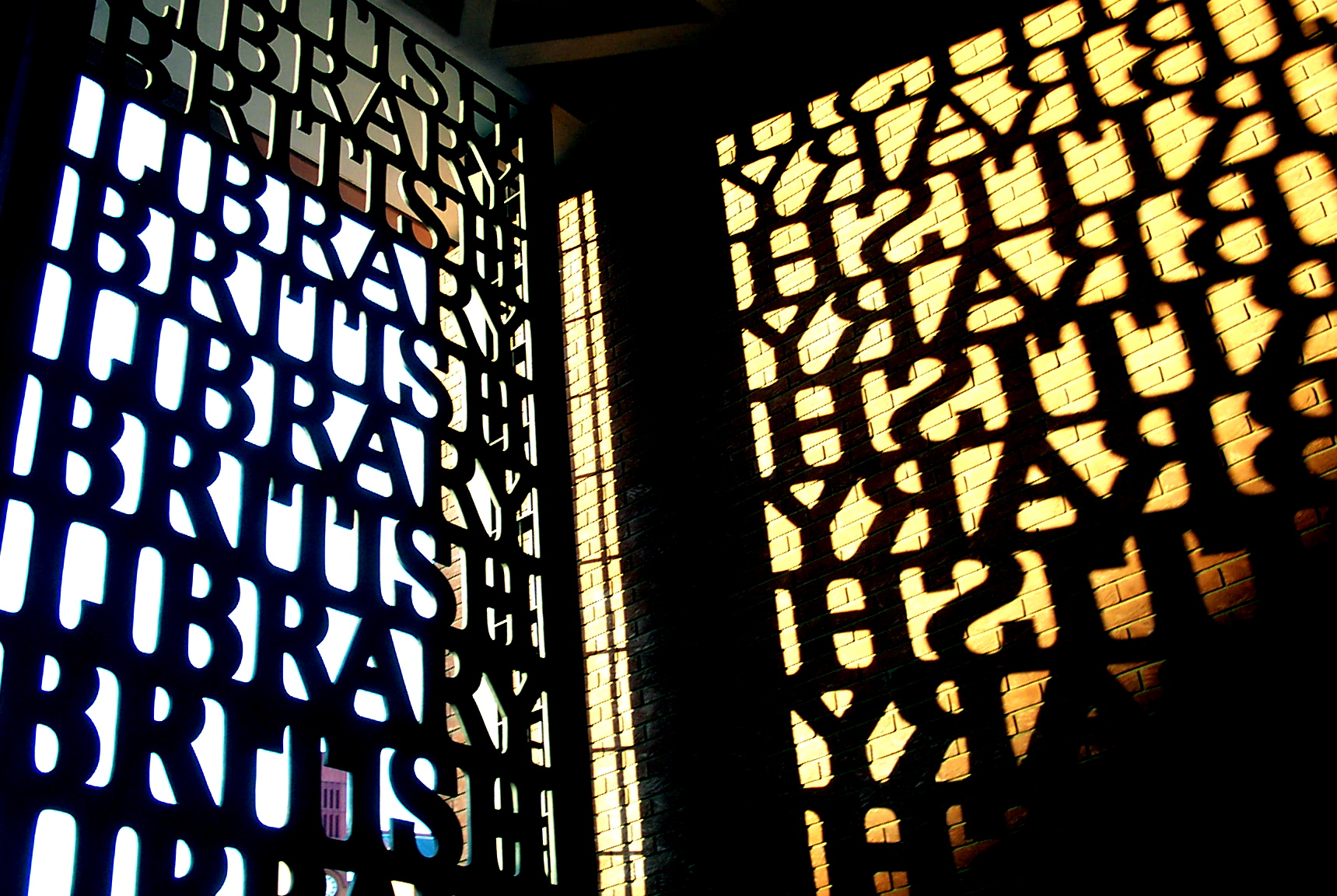
The British Library entrance gate

In 1976 she met British stone-carver and type designer David Kindersley at a conference about type design, and soon afterwards relocated to the UK to become his apprentice at his workshop in Cambridge. This association developed into a close creative partnership which lasted until David's death in 1995.

Lopes Cardozo and Kindersley collaborated on many creative works including the British Library gates, a 1980 memorial stone to Richard III at Leicester Cathedral and Stations of the Cross for the London Oratory School and in establishing the Cardozo Kindersley Workshop in Cambridge.

In her subsequent career Lopes Cardozo has created works across the UK and beyond as public and private commissions with a particular focus on gravestones and memorials.

Many of her works can be seen in Cambridge and Cambridge University, including a memorial for Stephen Hawking at Gonville and Caius College.

In the 2015 New Year Honours, she was appointed a Member of the Order of the British Empire (MBE) "for services to the craft of letter-cutting."

Lopes Cardozo is an Honorary Fellow of Magdalene College, Cambridge, and in 2023 was conferred with an honorary doctorate (Doctor of Letters) by Cambridge University.

=== Sundials ===
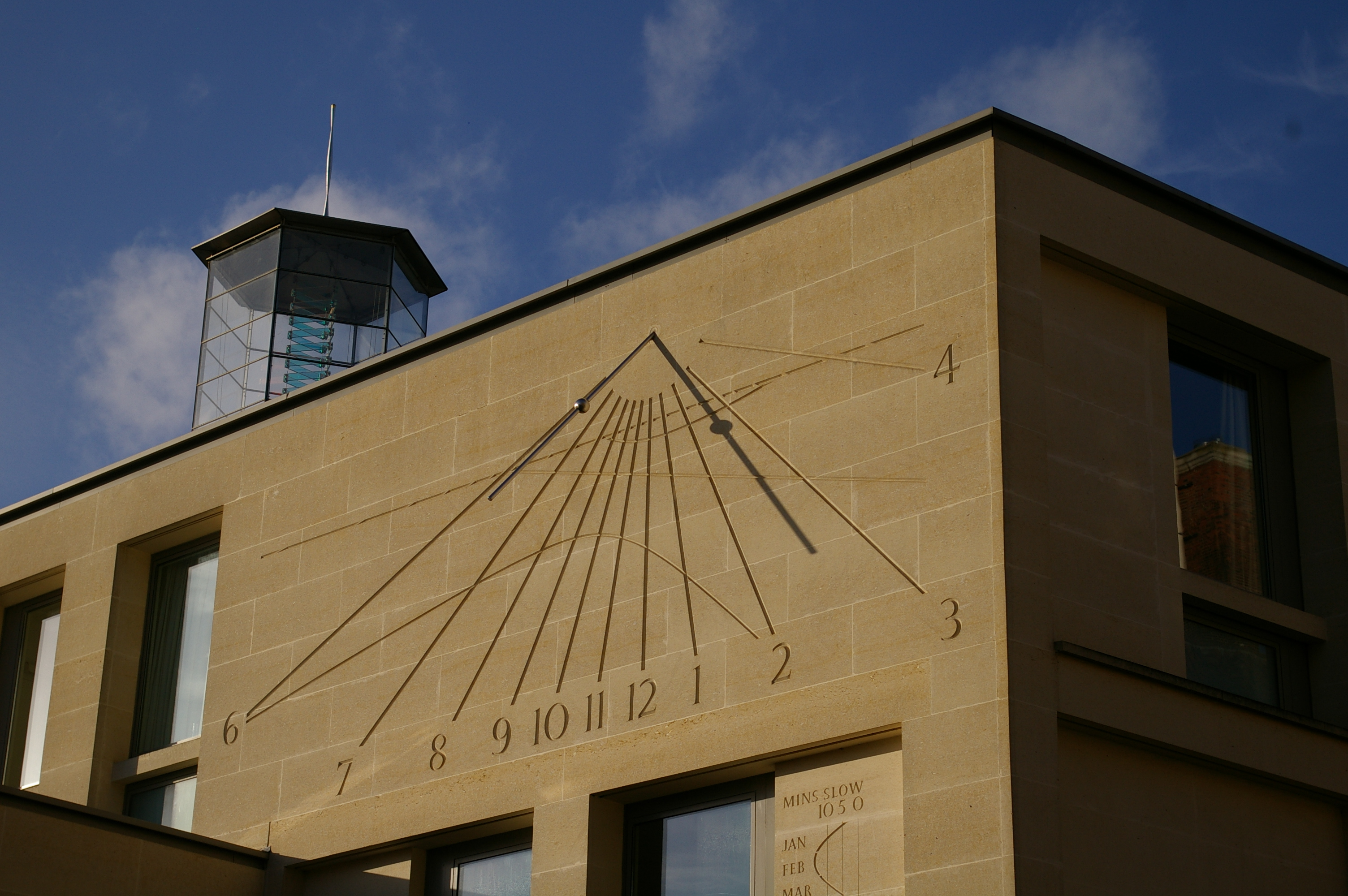
Sundial at Foundress Court, Pembroke College, Cambridge

Lopes Cardozo has cut a number of sundials on public buildings including Selwyn College and Pembroke College, Cambridge. In her work on sundials Lopes Cardozo has collaborated with Dr Frank King, Chairman of the British Sundial Society and Keeper of the Clock at Cambridge University, realising more than 20 of his sundial designs.

=== Type design ===
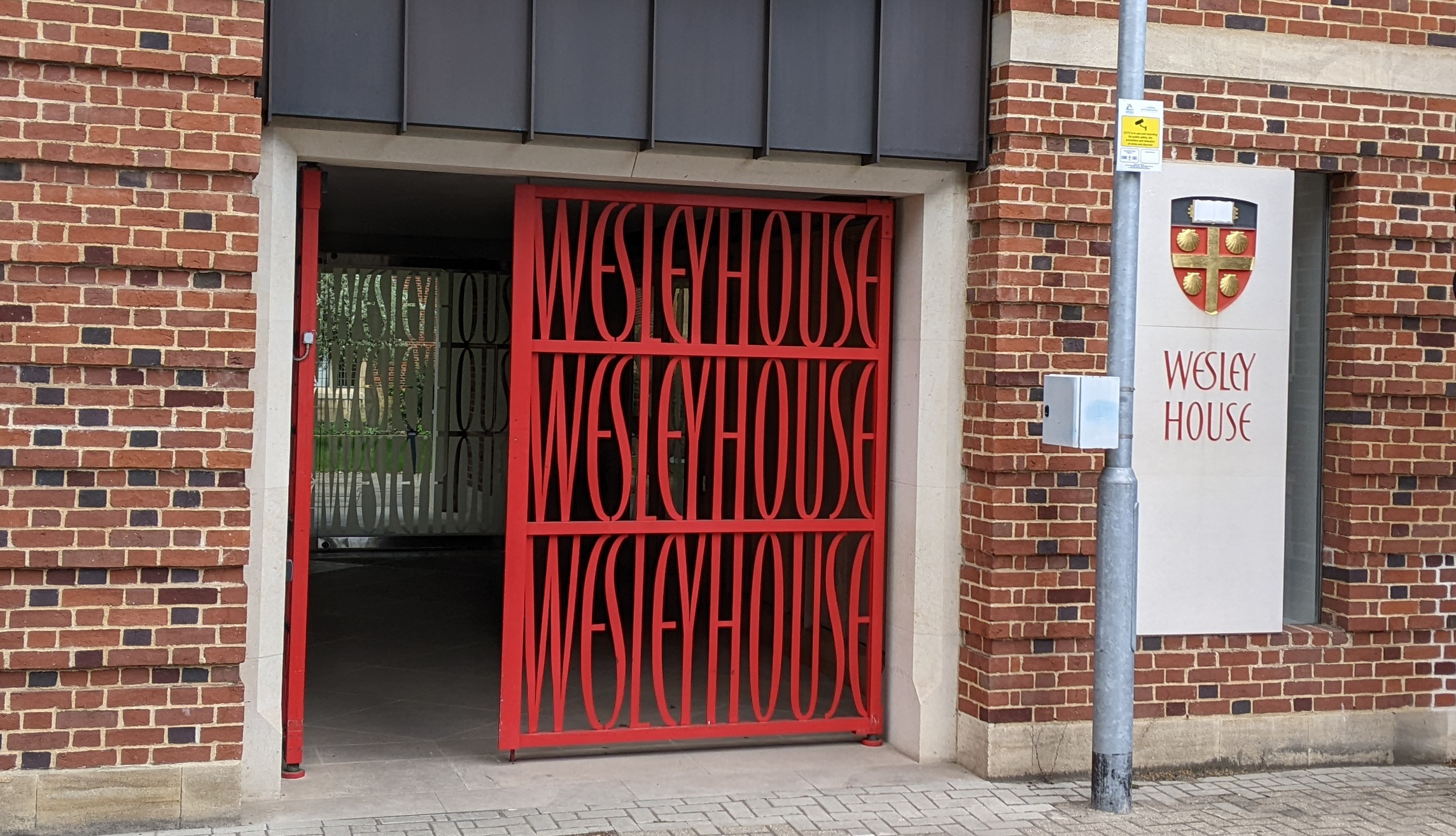
Entrance to Wesley House, Cambridge, 2016–17

As well as hand-cut letterforms, Lopes Cardozo has designed several digital typefaces including 'Emilida', commissioned by music company EMI and 'Pulle' which is based on letterforms Lopes Cardozo has been cutting for over 20 years and offers a very large range of letter heights rather than variations in weight.

'Pulle' was first used in public on a glass panel in the newly reopened Cambridge Central Library and also in Lopes Cardozo's design for the new entrance to Wesley House, Cambridge.

=== The Cardozo Kindersley Workshop ===
The Cardozo Kindersley Workshop in Cambridge was established by Lopes Cardozo and David Kindersley and since 1977 has occupied its current location in a converted Victorian school. Lopes Cardozo trains apprentices in lettercutting by hand, each usually staying at the workshop for three years.

Lopes Cardozo and Kindersley co-authored a number of publications on the art of lettering, their workshop, and the importance of apprenticeship. Lopes Cardozo has continued to write on these and other subjects and also publishes works through the Cardozo Kindersley imprint.

== The Shingle Street Shell Line ==
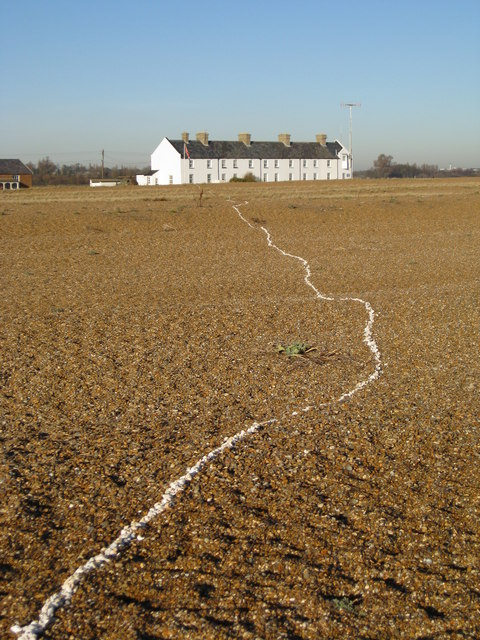
The Shingle Street Shell Line

In 2005 Lopes Cardozo and her childhood friend Els Bottema started to arrange a line of shells on the beach at Shingle Street in Suffolk. They began the line as a way of coping with their shared experience of cancer treatment and have returned regularly to maintain and add to the line since then.

== Personal life ==
Lida Lopes Cardozo married David Kindersley in 1986 and they had three sons together. Two of their sons—Hallam and Vincent—have joined her in working as letter cutters in the workshop, while the other—Paul—is an artist and filmmaker. Her second husband Graham Beck now runs the workshop with her, along with her daughter-in-law Roxanne Kindersley and her youngest son Vincent Kindersley.

== Selected publications ==
- Kindersley, David; Lopes Cardozo, Lida (1981). Letters Slate Cut: workshop practice and the making of letters. London: Lund Humphries. ISBN 0-85331-429-2.
- Lopes Cardozo, Lida (2009). The Annotated Capital: on the thinking behind the capital letter of the Cardozo Kindersley Workshop. Cambridge: Cambridge University Press. ISBN 9780521197229.
- Meara, David; Kindersley, Lida Lopes Cardozo (2013). Remembered Lives: personalised memorials in churches. Cambridge: Cardozo Kindersley Workshop/Cambridge University Press. ISBN 978-1-107-66448-7.
- Lopes Cardozo, Lida; Meara, David (2017). Cutting it in Oxford: Kindersley inscriptions in the city and county. Cambridge: Cardozo Kindersley. ISBN 9781874426219.
- King, Frank; Kindersley, Lida Lopes Cardozo (2019). Sundials: Cutting Time. Cambridge: Cardozo Kindersley Editions. ISBN 978-1-874426-23-3.
