= Ralph Beyer =

German letterer and sculptor

- Born: 6 April 1921; Berlin, Germany
- Died: 13 February 2008 (aged 86); Teddington, England
- Education: High Wycombe, London
- Known for: Sculpture, letter-cutter
- Notable work: Tablets of the Words Coventry Cathedral 1956
- Movement: New Typography movement

Ralph Alexander Beyer (6 April 1921 – 13 February 2008) was a German letter-cutter, sculptor and teacher. He was most noted for his work on Basil Spence's new Coventry Cathedral where Beyer carved Tablets of the Words.

== Early life ==
Ralph Beyer was born in Berlin in 1921. His father Oskar Beyer was a well known art historian. During his early childhood his family lived with relatives on an island near Potsdam before moving to Dresden in 1928. Due to the threat of arrest under the National Socialists the family moved to Crete in 1932 followed by Liechtenstein and Switzerland before going to stay with the German architect Erich Mendelsohn in England, United Kingdom, in 1937 and later in London and Cholesbury, Buckinghamshire with his mother's cousin and pioneering child psychotherapist, Margaret Lowenfeld. Ralph's Jewish mother, Margarete returned to Germany and during the Second World War was incarcerated in Auschwitz where she died in 1945. At the outbreak of war Ralph was sent to an internment camp in Liverpool and later on joined the Pioneer Corps in France and the British intelligence services as a translator.

== Career ==
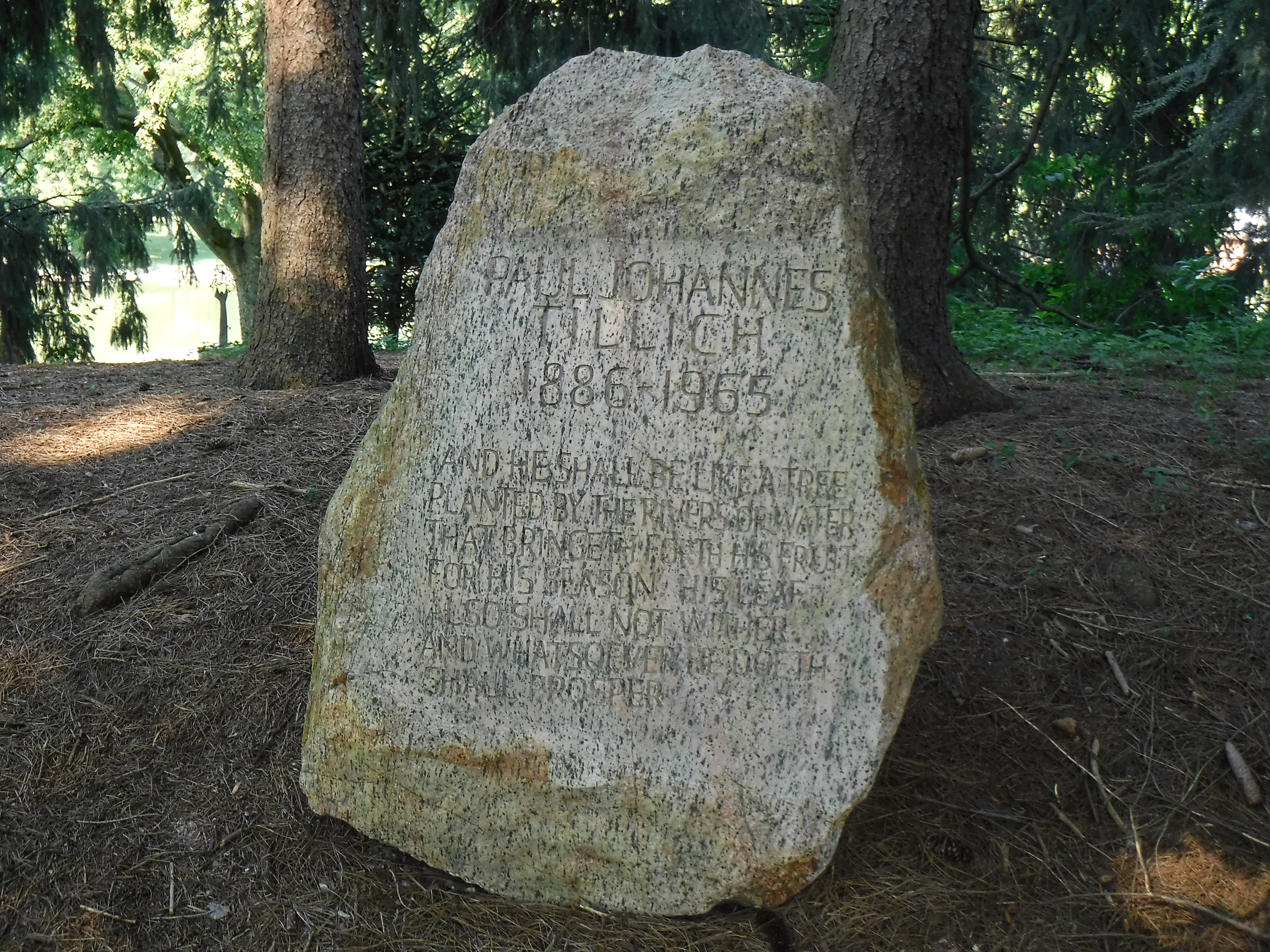
Paul Tillich's gravestone in the Paul Tillich Park, New Harmony, Indiana, United States

When Beyer came to England in 1937 he became apprenticed to the sculptor and typeface designer Eric Gill near High Wycombe, and went on to study at the Central School of Arts & Crafts and the Chelsea School of Art. He was taught there by the sculptor Henry Moore. During Beyer's internment he befriended the historian and architect Nicholas Pevsner assisting him on the writing of his books and in turn was greatly influenced by Pevsner's ideas on modern art.

After the War he worked as a mason and undertook numerous small commissions and taught briefly at St Christopher School, Letchworth, before being introduced in 1956 by Pevsner to Basil Spence who was looking for an artist to carry out lettering work on the interior of the new Coventry Cathedral. His unique typography style, known as "Felt" was in effect a customised corporate font for the new cathedral, appearing on hymnbooks, brasses and signs. However, it was the eight panels of Tablets of the Words, eight sandstone panels incised with quotations from the Bible and associated symbols which are most prominent, mounted on nave walls. This work, carried out in-situ while the cathedral was still under construction is noted as "the most significant work of British public lettering of the 20th century." Beyer's next major commission was to carve a memorial stone and lettering at the park in Indiana, United States created in memory to the German theologian Paul Tillich who he had first met as a boy in Potstam.

In 1960 he was teaching at Sidcup School of Art, where he remained until its closure in 1963, after which he transferred to the new Ravensbourne College of Art and Design. He also taught typography from 1968 to 1986 at the University of Reading and from 1983 to 1994 letter-cutting at the City and Guilds of London Art School.

== Personal life ==
Beyer was first married to Ann Poole in 1940 with whom he had a son and three daughters. In 1960 he married his second wife, Hilary Reynolds and had two children, both daughters. He died in Teddington London in February 2008.

== Works by Ralph Beyer ==
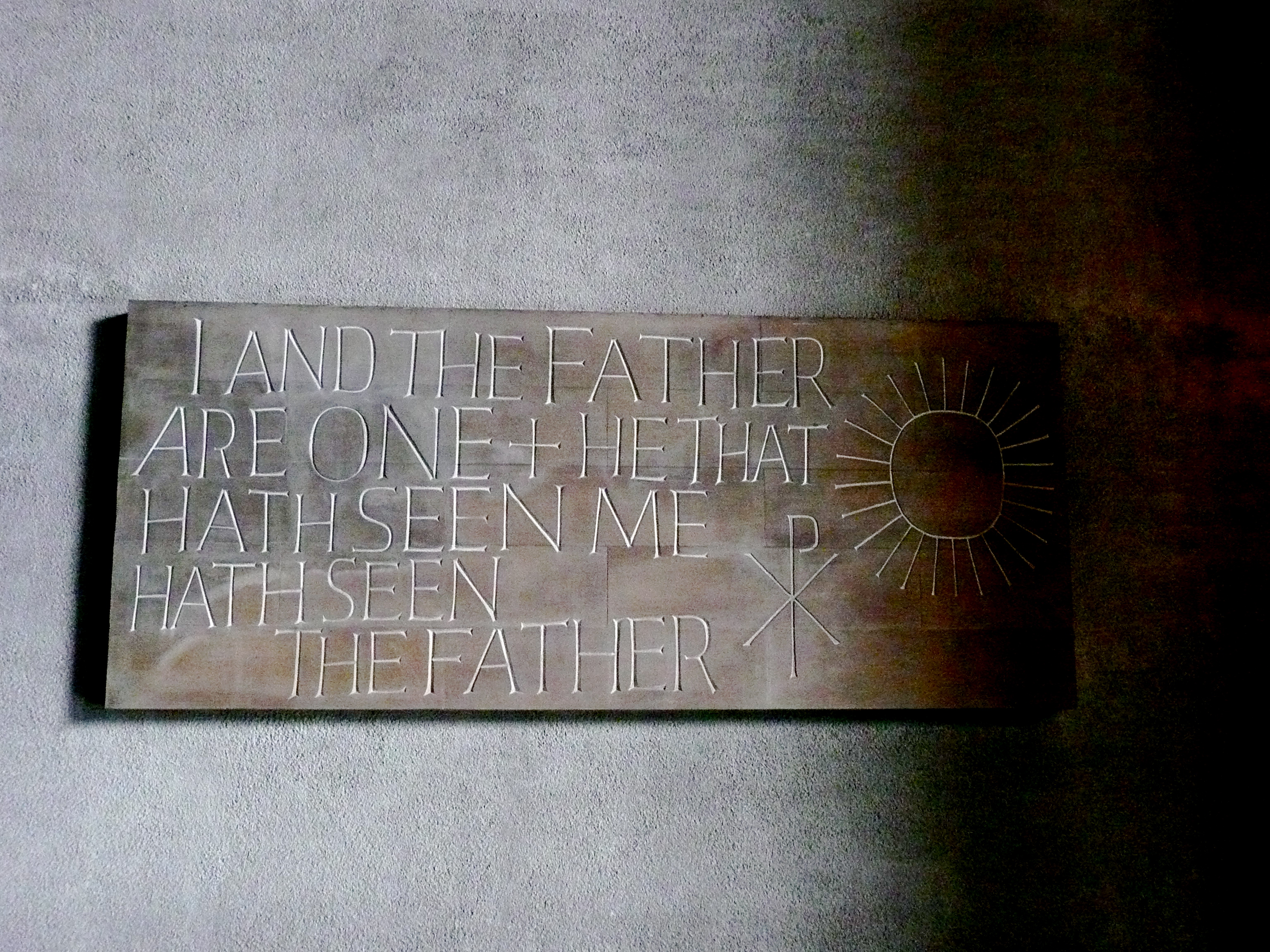
One of the Tablets of the Words in Coventry Cathedral

- Tablets of the Words – Coventry Cathedral – 1956–62
- Inscription – St Catherine of Siena, Richmond, Sheffield – 1959
- Cast concrete frieze – St Paul's Church, Bow Common, London – 1960
- Lettercut Memorial – Paul Tilich Park New Harmony, Indiana – 1966
- Inscription – Haddington Church, East Lothian – 1974
- Inscription Henry Moore Reclining Figure – Dartington Hall, Devon –
- Memorial – Edith Sitwell – St Mary's, Weedon Lois, Northamptonshire –
- Altar inscription & carving – Royal Foundation of St. Katharine, Tower of London-
- Inscription – Child Care Centre Paulikita (today Komşu), Berlin-Kreuzberg – 1985 (part of the International Building Exhibition Berlin)

== See also ==
- Eric Gill
- David Jones
- David Kindersley
- Rudolf Koch
- Erich Mendelsohn
- Henry Moore
- Nikolaus Pevsner
