= Intake, Sheffield =

Village in South Yorkshire, England

Coordinates: 53.356°N 1.421°W

Intake
- Suburb
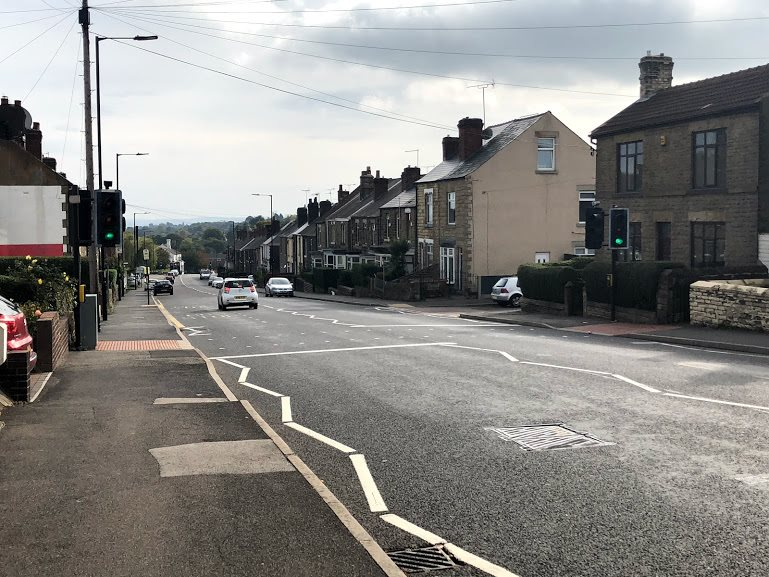
- Mansfield Road, Intake

- Location within South Yorkshire
- OS grid reference: SK386847
- Metropolitan borough: Sheffield
- Metropolitan county: South Yorkshire
- Region: Yorkshire and the Humber
- Country: England
- Sovereign state: United Kingdom
- Post town: SHEFFIELD
- Postcode district: S12
- Police: South Yorkshire
- Fire: South Yorkshire
- Ambulance: Yorkshire

Intake is a suburb and former village located 5 miles (8 km) south-east of Sheffield city centre, South Yorkshire, England. Due to expansion during the 20th century, the village became a part of the city of Sheffield. Intake is linked to Frecheville via Birley Moor Road, and to Gleadless via Hollinsend Road.

== History ==
Prior to the 19th century, the area was mainly farmland. The Shire Brook which flows through the south-east, originally marked the boundary between Derbyshire and Yorkshire. However, in the 20th century, many collieries were opened in the area, with coal mining being the main source of employment. In the 1870 publication Imperial Gazetteer of England and Wales by John Marius Wilson, Intake is described as being 'a village in Handsworth parish, W. R. Yorkshire; 3 miles SE of Sheffield. It stands adjacent to collieries, and has a post office under Sheffield'.

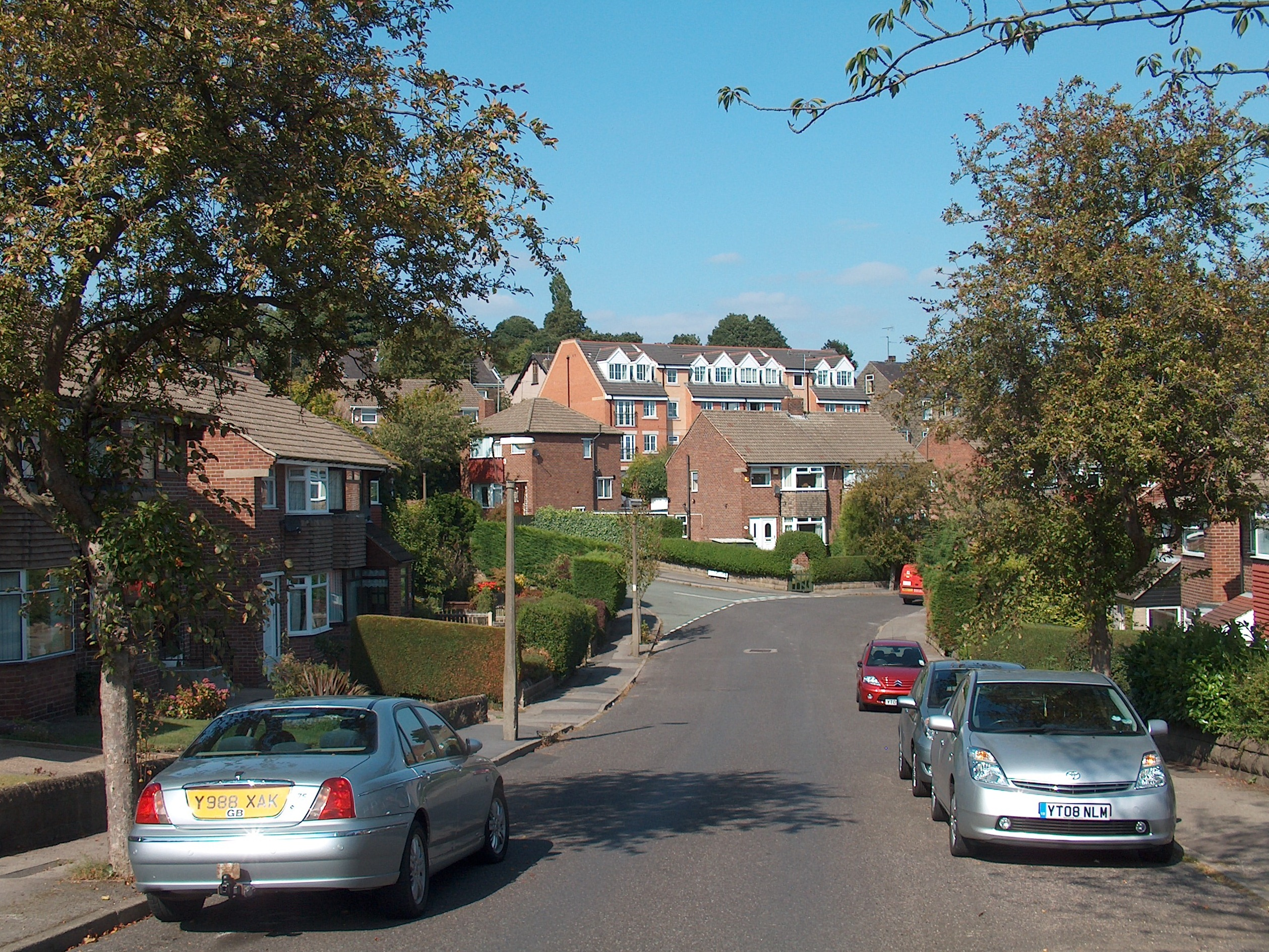
Residential housing on Pleasant Road, Intake

There are a number of listed buildings in the area, including the Intake Cemetery Chapel constructed in 1879, along with the surrounding walls and washhouse. The first burial at the cemetery was for a George Smith, killed at Birley Collieries on 13 January 1903.

== Notable people ==
- Jarvis Cocker of Pulp was born in Intake.

== See also ==
- Richmond, Sheffield
