= Richmond, Sheffield =

Suburb and electoral ward in the City of Sheffield, South Yorkshire, England

Coordinates: 53.364°N 1.395°W

Richmond
- Shown within Sheffield
- Population: 17,700 (2011)
- Metropolitan borough: City of Sheffield
- Metropolitan county: South Yorkshire
- Region: Yorkshire and the Humber
- Country: England
- Sovereign state: United Kingdom
- UK Parliament: Sheffield Heeley
- Councillors: Mike Drabble (Labour Party); Dianne Hurst (Sheffield Community Councillors Group); David Barker (Labour Party)

Richmond is a suburb of Sheffield in South Yorkshire, England. It lies in the eastern part of the city (grid reference SK403854).

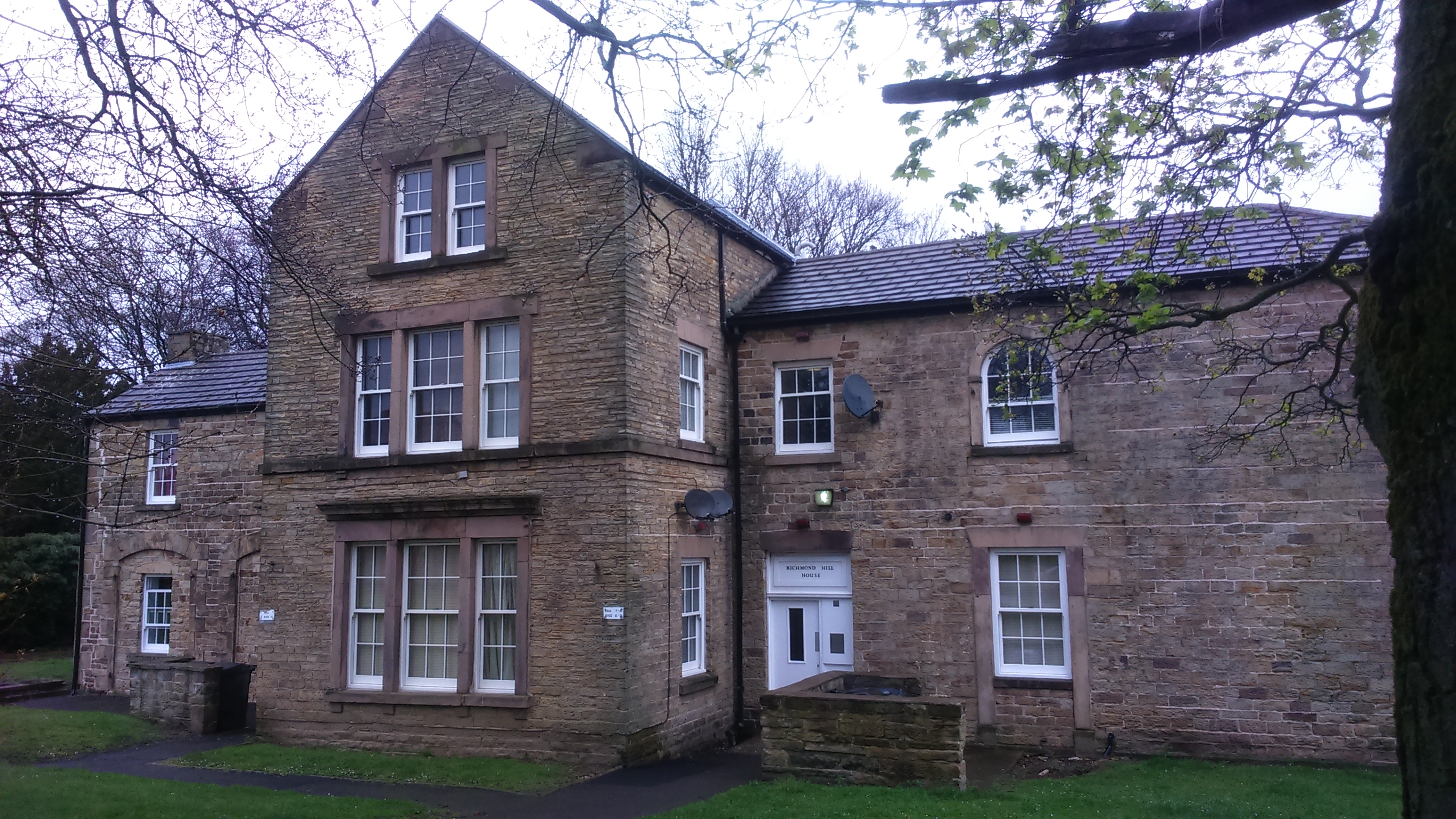
Richmond Hill House, on Stradbroke Road in Richmond

Richmond was historically a small settlement consisting of a few cottages and Richmond Hall Farm, built in 1668 and demolished in 1966. Gateposts from the farm, which may have originally flanked an entrance to Sheffield Park, can still be seen amidst a housing estate dating from the late 1960s.

The suburb is served by St Catherine of Siena church, designed by Basil Spence.

== Electoral ward ==
Richmond gives its name to one of the 28 electoral wards of Sheffield, in the southern part of the city. In addition to the suburb of Richmond, Richmond ward also includes the districts of Four Lane Ends, Intake, and Woodthorpe, and covers an area of 4.5 km^{2}. The population of the ward in 2011 was 17,724 people in 7,827 households. It is one of the five wards that form the Sheffield Heeley parliamentary constituency. The boundary changed at the local elections in May 2016.

=== Four Lane Ends ===
Four Lane Ends is the crossroads at the bottom of Birley Moor Road, where it continues as Mansfield Road with the B6063 cutting through from Normanton Hill, where it becomes Hollinsend Road heading towards Gleadless.

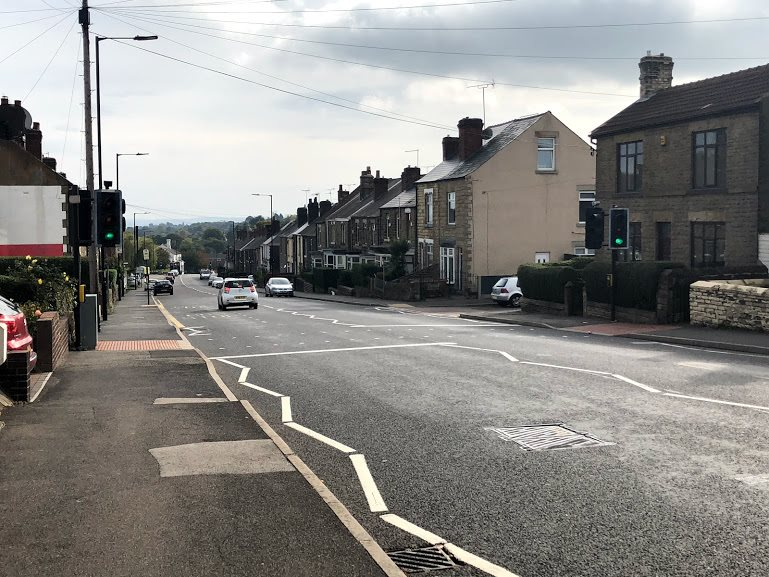
Mansfield Road, looking down towards Four Lane Ends

=== Intake ===
Intake (grid reference SK386846) lies south of Manor Top. It is primarily a 1930s residential area. Jarvis Cocker, lead singer of the band Pulp was born in the area. The area also features a local cemetery.

=== Woodthorpe ===
Built in the 1930s, Woodthorpe (grid reference SK392852) lies to the east of Intake. It has two pubs, the "High Noon" and "The Springwood", and also has a primary school (Woodthorpe), which was rebuilt in September 2005. However now "The Springwood" has closed down due to unpopular demand in the area and it is now abandoned and boarded up.
