= St Catherine of Siena, Richmond =

Church in Sheffield, England

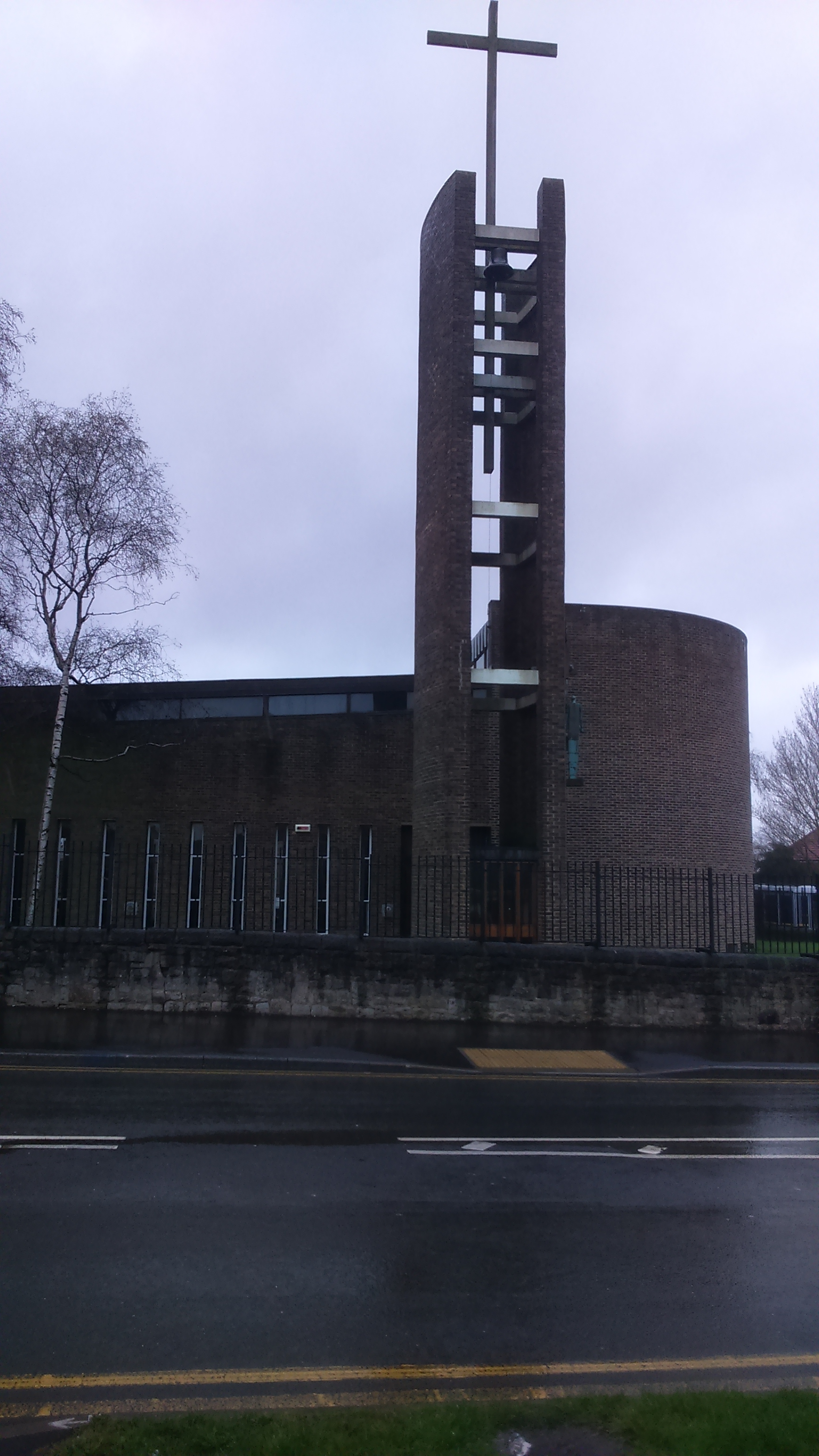
- St Catherine of Siena, seen from the south east

- Location within Sheffield

Religion
- Affiliation: Anglican
- District: Diocese of Sheffield
- Province: York
- Ecclesiastical or organizational status: Church
- Leadership: Philip Knowles (priest)
- Year consecrated: 1959

Location
- Location: Richmond, Sheffield; South Yorkshire, England
- Interactive map of St Catherine of Siena, Richmond
- Coordinates: 53.3615°N 1.4072°W

Architecture
- Architect: Basil Spence
- Type: Church
- Style: Modernist
- Completed: 1959
- Construction cost: £50000 (£1,010,000 in 2025)

Specifications
- Capacity: 300
- Length: 99 feet
- Width: 42 feet
- Height (max): 56 feet
- Materials: Brick

Website
- www.stcathsiena.co.uk

St Catherine of Siena is an Anglican church in the Richmond district of Sheffield in England.

== History of the parish ==
Historically, Richmond was a sparsely populated area forming the western end of the Handsworth parish. The Woodthorpe estate was constructed in the area from the 1930s, and in 1935, a chapel-of-ease was constructed to serve its population. It was a temporary structure of corrugated asbestos at the junction of Richmond Road and Hastilar Road. In 1949, a parish was created for it, but the local population had increased to more than 10,000 people, and the church was considered insufficient and in need of replacement. Frederick Etchells was commissioned to design a new church, to seat 500 people, but although he produced drawings, there was initially no money available to construct the building.

== Design ==
St Phillip's Church in Attercliffe was destroyed by bombing during World War II, and although War Damage compensation was available, population decline in that area led the Diocese of Sheffield to request that the money be transferred to the Woodthorpe parish. This was agreed, and Etchells was asked to update his previous design. However, Etchells had largely retired, and rejected the job. Instead, Basil Spence was given the commission. Initially, he produced a design similar to his work at St Hugh, Leicester, but in 1957 he completely altered the designs, working with Anthony Blee who produced drawings of the elevations. This new design was for a brick church, with an attached hall, bell tower attached by a glazed passage, and a detached vicarage. Its appearance, largely plain, with narrow windows, was inspired by Eliel and Eero Saarinen's Christ Evangelical Church in Minneapolis.

== Construction and opening ==
Construction started on the project, on the site of the earlier church. It was already well underway by April 1959, when its foundation stone was dedicated by the Bishop of Sheffield and the Earl of Scarborough. Ralph Beyer carved the name of the church by the doorway shortly before it opened on 5 December 1959. Once opened, the parish was renamed Richmond, after the larger suburb which it included. Congregations remained much smaller than expected, as many local residents were either Catholic or Methodist, and averaged only thirty worshippers for many years.

Inside the church, the altar is of black metal with a timber top, and the font is made of limestone with fossil inclusions. Work on furnishings and decorations continued over the next few years; an organ was installed, and a sculpture by Ronald Pope was added to the bell tower in 1966.

== Recent history ==
Congregations finally began growing in the late 1980s, as the population of the local area saw generational change. A major restoration was completed in 1997, following which, the church was listed at Grade II.

The church maintains what it describes as a Catholic style of worship. It does not support the ordination of women and, as such, has taken the option of submitting to the Provincial episcopal visitor, the Bishop of Beverley.
