= Ronald Pope =

English sculptor and artist

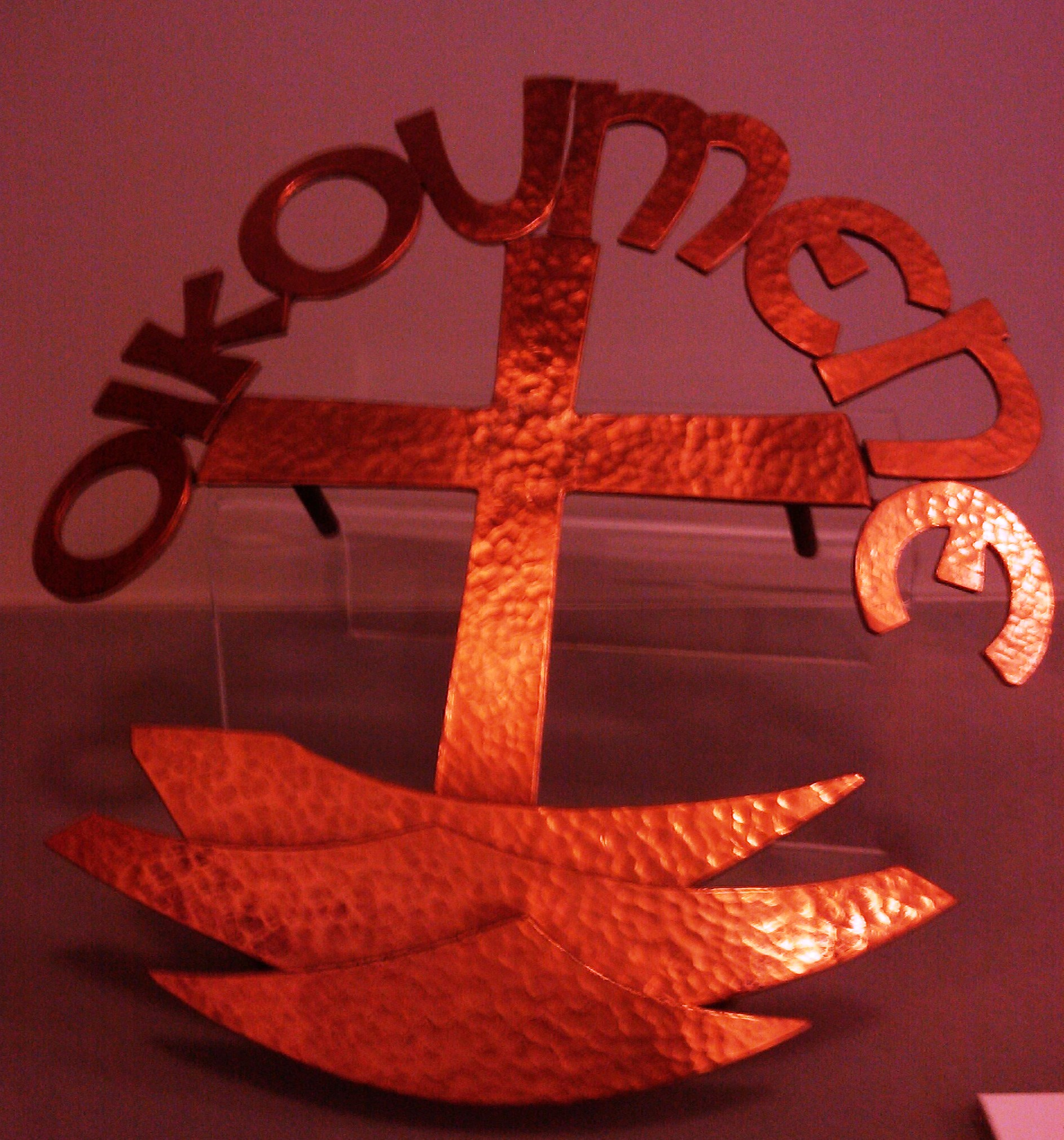
A sculpture from the chapel of Derby Royal Infirmary. Oikoumene is an ancient Greek word meaning "the inhabited world". This sculpture is now in Derby Museum

Ronald Pope (16 August 1920–14 May 1997) was an English sculptor and artist.

== Biography ==
Pope was born in 1920 and after his studies moved to Derbyshire to work as an engineer. He started at the Rolls-Royce factory in Derby (the largest employer at that time in the city). He was at Rolls-Royce throughout the Second World War as a tool maker, where the engines were built for the Spitfire aircraft. Pope learnt and gained experience in techniques such as welding and brazing which he exploited later for artistic reasons. After the end of the war he went to London to study sculpture at the Slade School of Fine Art with Prof. F. McWilliam. Pope continued studying ceramics afterward at Woolwich Polytechnic with the ceramist Heber Matthews.

Pope lived and worked as an artist in Melbourne, Derbyshire. He was inspired by his love of the countryside, particularly the Derbyshire High Peak, the Derbyshire Dales, the Lake District and Snowdonia. The influence of rock formations can be seen in a number of his sculptures.

== Artworks ==
Pope used various materials for his artwork: wood, stone and metal. Some of his metal works (and some in wood, too) look austere, but this is due to their abstract form. Apart from sculptures, Pope also created paintings and drawings. As an artist, Pope received commissions from churches and from local authorities like Hertford, where he created the "'Five Bishops" sculpture on what was then called Castle Hall to celebrate the 13th centenary of the first synod at Hertford.

Other Pope locations include: Derby University, Derby Cathedral, and school commissions he completed for Derby Moor School, Derby School for the Deaf, Curzon Primary and Normanton Junior in Derby, Abington High School in Wigston, architects, private companies, and individuals, including the architect Sir Basil Spence, for whom he designed a sculpture at St Catherine of Siena, Richmond, in Sheffield.

In 2008 Derby Museum and Art Gallery held an exhibition of his works entitled "Ronald Pope – Sculpture from the Museums' Collection".
