= Rydal Water =

Lake in Cumbria, England

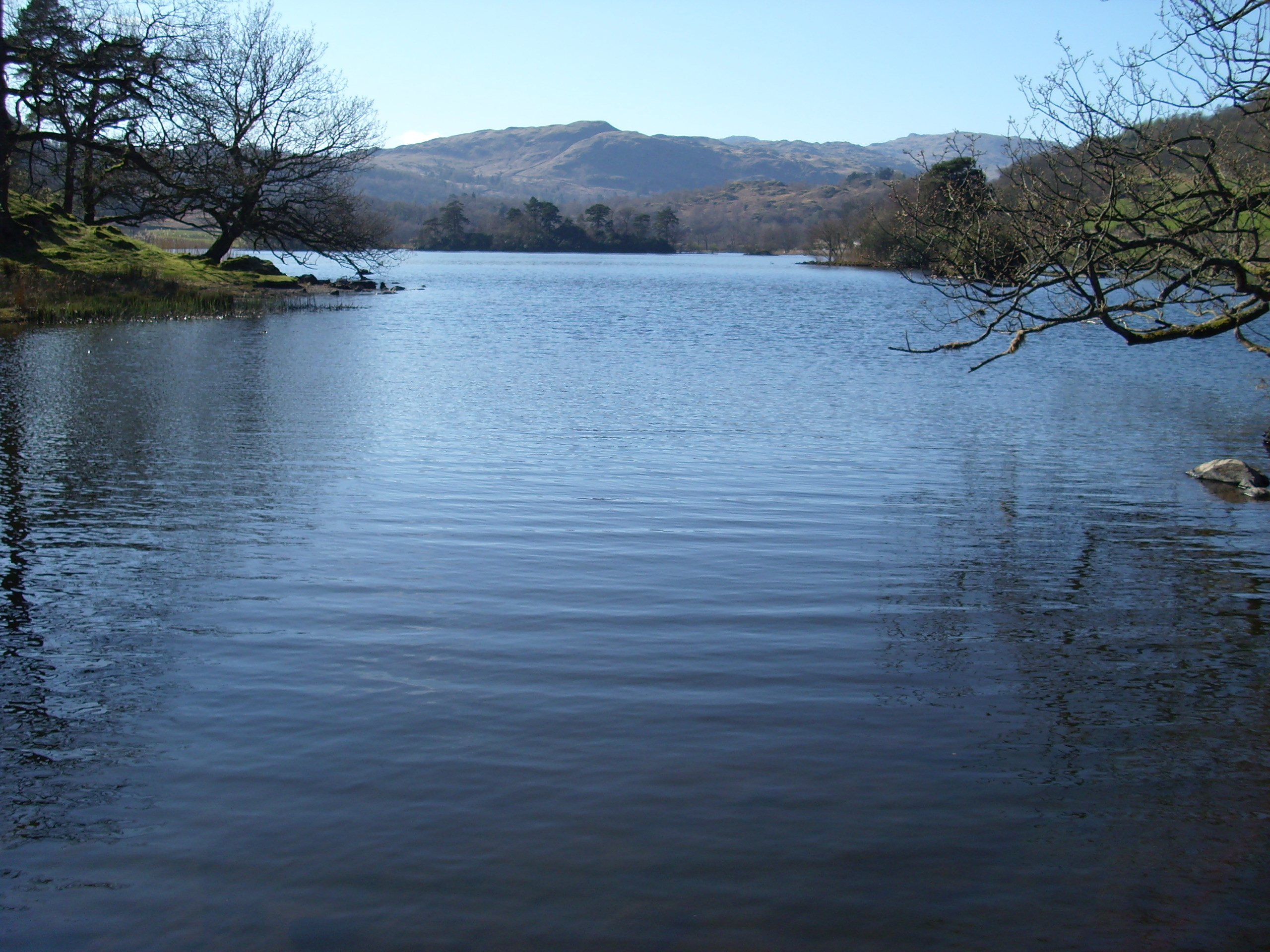

- Location in the Lake District National Park Location in South Lakeland, Cumbria
- Location: Lake District, Cumbria
- Coordinates: 54°26′49″N 2°59′47″W
- Type: Ribbon
- Primary inflows: River Rothay
- Primary outflows: River Rothay
- Basin countries: United Kingdom
- Max. length: 1,290 yd (1,180 m)
- Max. width: 380 yd (350 m)
- Surface area: 0.12 sq mi (0.31 km^{2})
- Max. depth: 55 ft (17 m)
- Shore length^{1}: 2.87 km (1.78 mi)
- Surface elevation: 177 ft (54 m)
- Islands: 4
- ^{1} Shore length is not a well-defined measure.

Rydal Water is a small body of water in the central part of the English Lake District, in the county of Cumbria. It is located near the hamlet of Rydal, between Grasmere and Ambleside in the Rothay Valley.

The lake is 1,290 yards (1.18 km) long and varies in width up to a maximum of 380 yards (350m), covering an area of 0.12 mi^{2} (0.31 km^{2}). It has a maximum depth of 55 ft (17m) and an elevation above sea level of 177 ft (54m). The lake is both supplied and drained by the river Rothay, which flows from Grasmere upstream and towards Windermere downstream.

The waters of the southern half of the lake are leased by the Lowther Estate to the National Trust, whilst those of the northern half belong to the estate of Rydal Hall. Navigation is prohibited, except for residents of Rydal Hall.

Numerous walks are possible in the surrounding hills, as well as a walk around the lake itself, which takes in Dove Cottage and Rydal Mount, both homes to William Wordsworth, and Rydal Cave, a former quarry working. At the western end of the lake, steps lead to Wordsworth's Seat, which is considered to have been Wordsworth's favourite viewpoint in the Lake District.

White Moss House, at the northern end of the lake, is believed to be the only house that Wordsworth ever bought. He bought it for his son Willie, and the family lived there until the 1930s. Nab Cottage overlooks the lake and it was once home to Thomas de Quincey and Hartley Coleridge, the son of Samuel Taylor Coleridge. Close by is the historic Rydal Hall.

== Toponymy ==
'Rydal' is " 'the valley where rye is grown', from OE 'ryge' and ON 'dalr' (possibly with encouragement from OE 'dæl'), hence the village and parish situated there....'Rydal Water' was formerly 'Routhmere', the lake of the Rothay, which runs eastwards through it.". "'Wæter' OE,'water' ModE the dominant term for 'lake'.... ON=Old Norse; OE=Old English.

== In Art and Literature ==
In Fisher's Drawing Room Scrap Book, 1838 is an engraving of a picture by George Pickering Rydal Water and Grasmere Lake., which is accompanied by a poetical illustration by Letitia Elizabeth Landon in which she expresses her homage to Wordsworth.

== Gallery ==
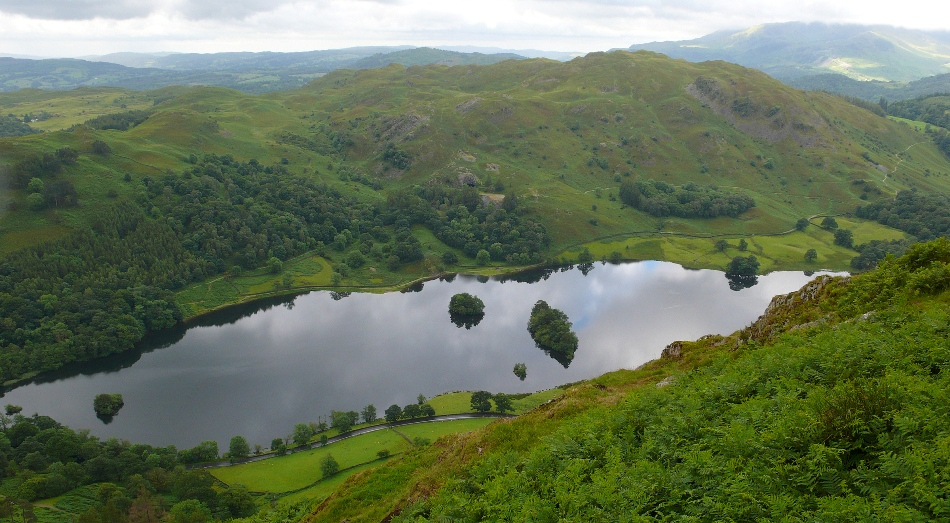
Rydal Water seen from the summit of Nab Scar.

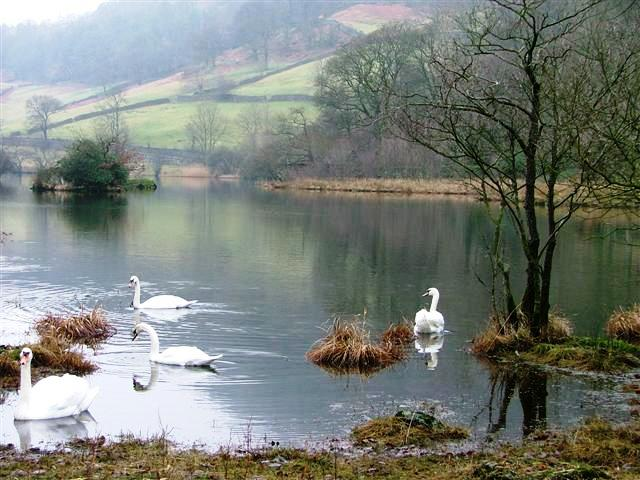
Eastern end of Rydal Water.

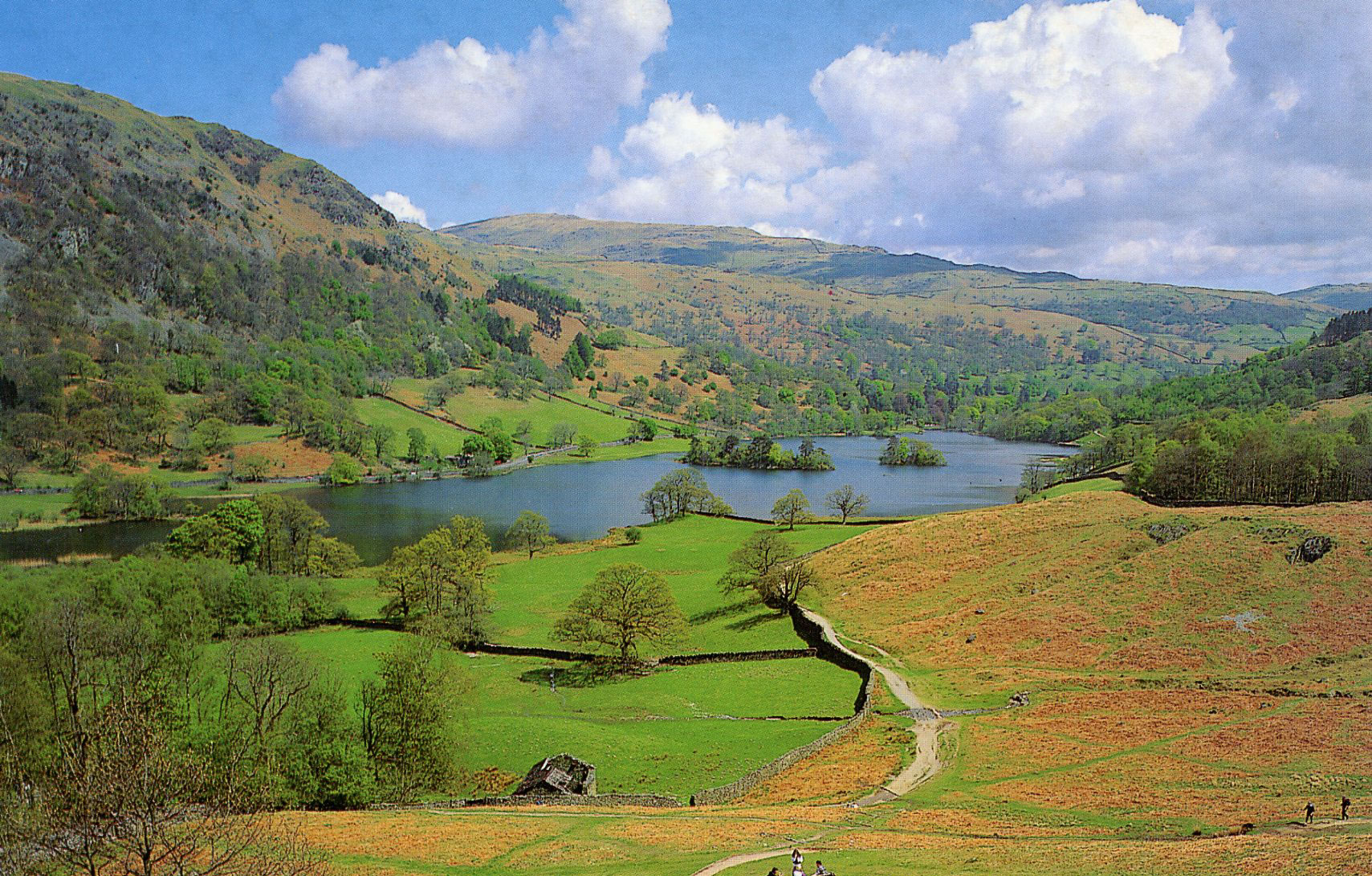
From Loughrigg, Lake District.

== Bibliography ==
- Parker, John Wilson (2004). An Atlas of the English Lakes. Cicerone Press. ISBN 1-85284-355-1.
