= Letter cutting =

Form of inscriptional architectural lettering

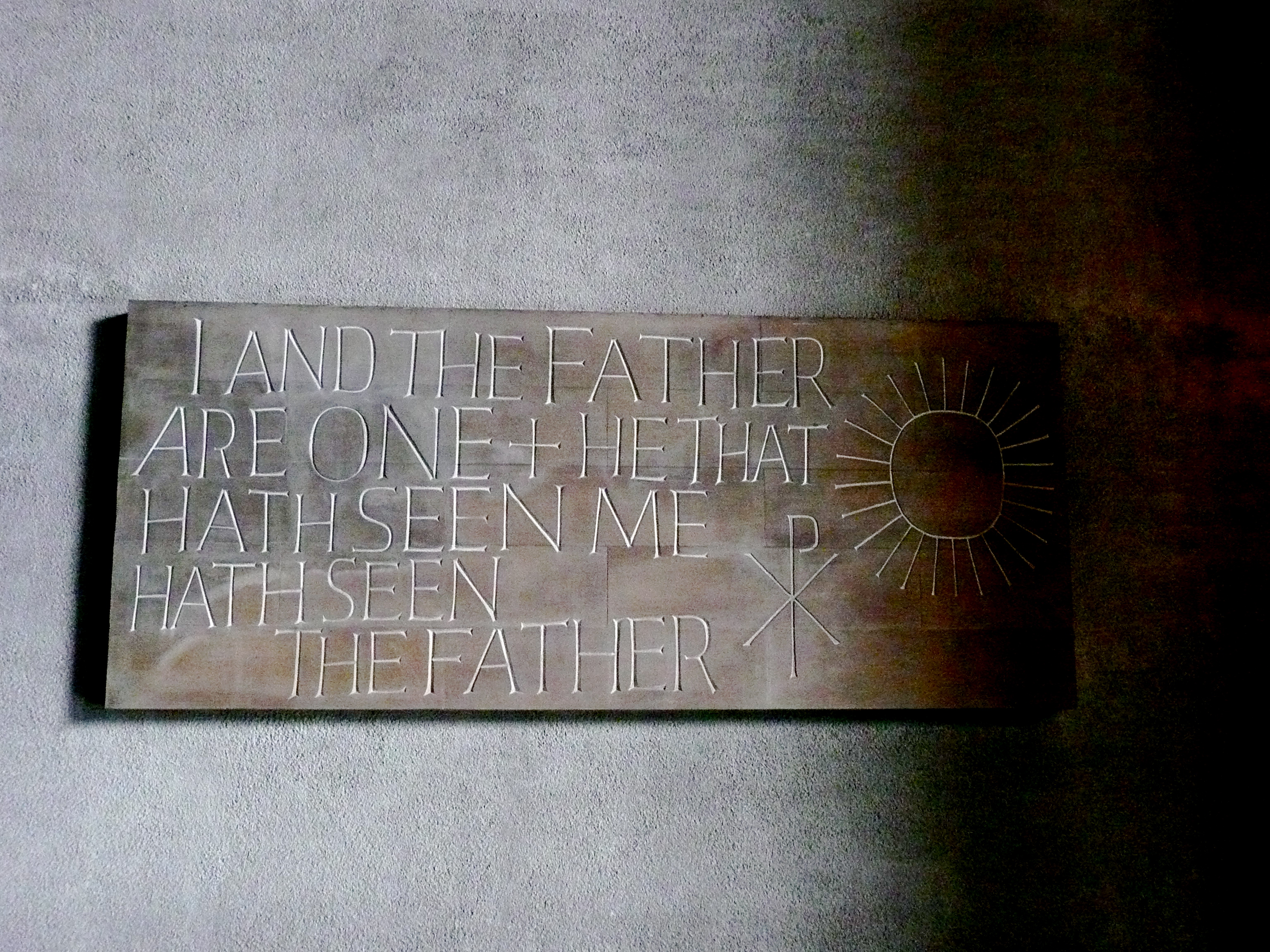
One of Ralph Beyer's Tablets of the Words in Coventry Cathedral.

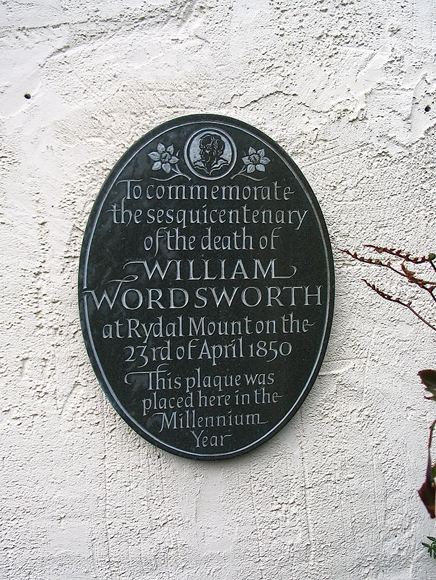
The plaque for the William Wordsworth Sesquicentenary, Rydal Mount, Cumbria, by John Shaw

Letter cutting is a form of inscriptional architectural lettering closely related to monumental masonry and stone carving, often practised by artists, sculptors, and typeface designers. Rather than traditional stone carving, where images and symbols are the dominant features, in letter cutting the unique skill is "meticulous setting out and skilled cutting of the lettering style, in terms of design, angle and depth of the lettering".

Letter carvers see the drawing and carving of letters as a particular craft in itself, allied to but distinct from masonry and carving in general. Most letter carvers are both designers and carvers. Typefaces designed for printing are rarely satisfactory when carved into stone, so most letter carvers design their own letterforms.

— Daniel Carpenter, Heritage Crafts Association, April 2017

"However, the majority of letter cutting is now manufactured using methods such as sand blasting and laser etching".

Notable practitioners include:

- Nicholas Benson
- Eric Gill
- Ralph Beyer
- Michael Harvey
- David Kindersley
- Richard Kindersley
- John Shaw
- Reynolds Stone
- Macdonald Gill
- Bryant Fedden
