= Intake Cemetery, Sheffield =

Cemetery in Sheffield, South Yorkshire, England

Coordinates: 53.357°N 1.415°W

Intake Cemetery
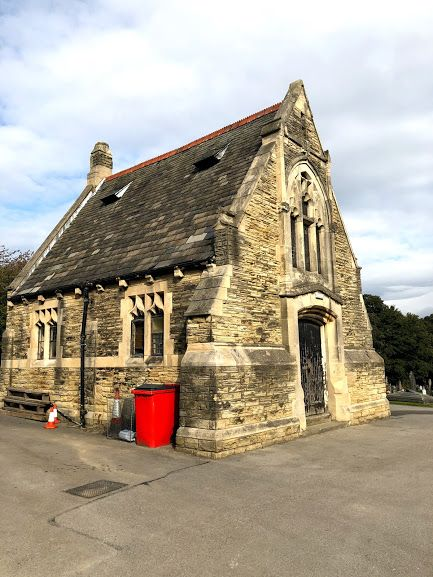
- Intake Cemetery Chapel
- Interactive map of Intake Cemetery

Details
- Established: 1879
- Location: Mansfield Road, Intake, Sheffield, South Yorkshire
- Country: United Kingdom
- Type: Anglican cemetery
- Style: Victoria
- Owned by: Sheffield City Council
- Website: Sheffield City Council
- Find a Grave: Intake Cemetery

Intake Cemetery (also known as Intake Village Cemetery) is one of the city of Sheffield's many cemeteries. The cemetery, located at Mansfield Road, Intake, Sheffield, South Yorkshire, England, covers 12 acres (4.9 ha), with the first interment taking place on 16 February 1880. The cemetery features a Grade II listed chapel which was designed by Innocent and Brown.

The cemetery features a number of Commonwealth War Graves, including 21 casualties of the Second World War and 4 casualties from the First World War.

The cemetery took its name from the earlier City Road Cemetery which was originally known as Intake Road Cemetery.
