= Rydal Mount =

19th-century home of William Wordsworth

Coordinates: 54.4487°N 2.9824°W

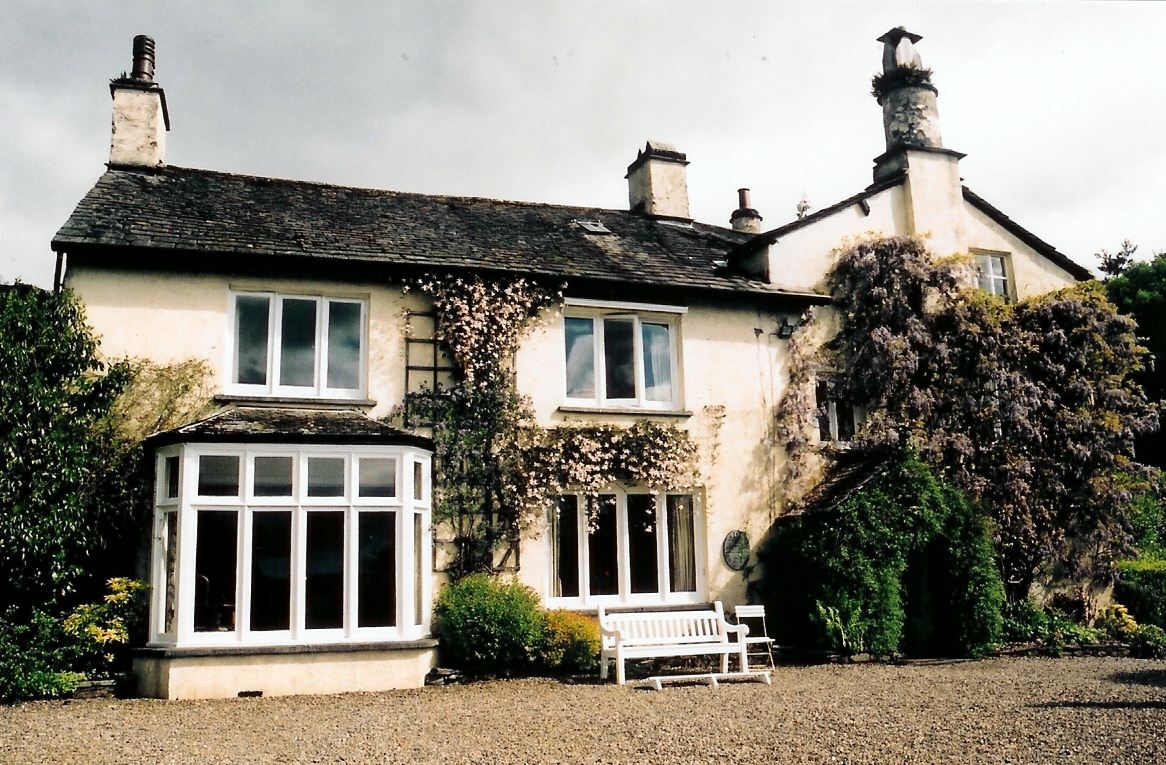
Rydal Mount, pictured in 2007

Rydal Mount is a house in the small village of Rydal, Cumbria, near Ambleside in the English Lake District. It was the home of the poet William Wordsworth from 1813 until his death in 1850, and his sister, the author, poet, and diarist Dorothy Wordsworth, until her death in 1855. It is currently operated as a writer's home museum.

== History ==
Wordsworth was born in Cockermouth in Cumberland in 1770, and knew the Lake District well from his childhood. He moved away to study at the University of Cambridge in 1787, and then travelled in Britain and continental Europe for 12 years. He spent over 8 years at Dove Cottage in nearby Grasmere from 1799 to 1808, but was forced to move to accommodate his growing family and many visitors. After a period in Allan Bank in Grasmere, the Wordsworths moved to Rydal Mount in 1813; it remained their home until their deaths.

Both Grasmere and Windermere lakes can be seen from the hillside grounds of Rydal Mount. William designed the layout of the gardens at Rydal, and he often said that those grounds were his office as opposed to the spacious office/writing room in his house. On the high side of the grounds, tucked away from the main house, but overlooking both the grounds and the two nearby lakes, he built the "Writing Hut" where he spent most of his writing time. This hut consisted merely of a bench with a small roof, but it provided shelter from the frequent rains and escape from the house. He frequently was visited by Samuel Taylor Coleridge who would walk down from his home in Keswick.

Wordsworth died in 1850 and Mary in 1859. Rydal Mount was acquired in 1969 by Mary Henderson (née Wordsworth), William's great-great granddaughter, and it was opened to the public in 1970. In 2025 its owners put Rydal Mount on the market. In 2026 it was purchased by the Wordsworth Trust. Rydal Mount is a Grade I listed building.

== Gallery ==
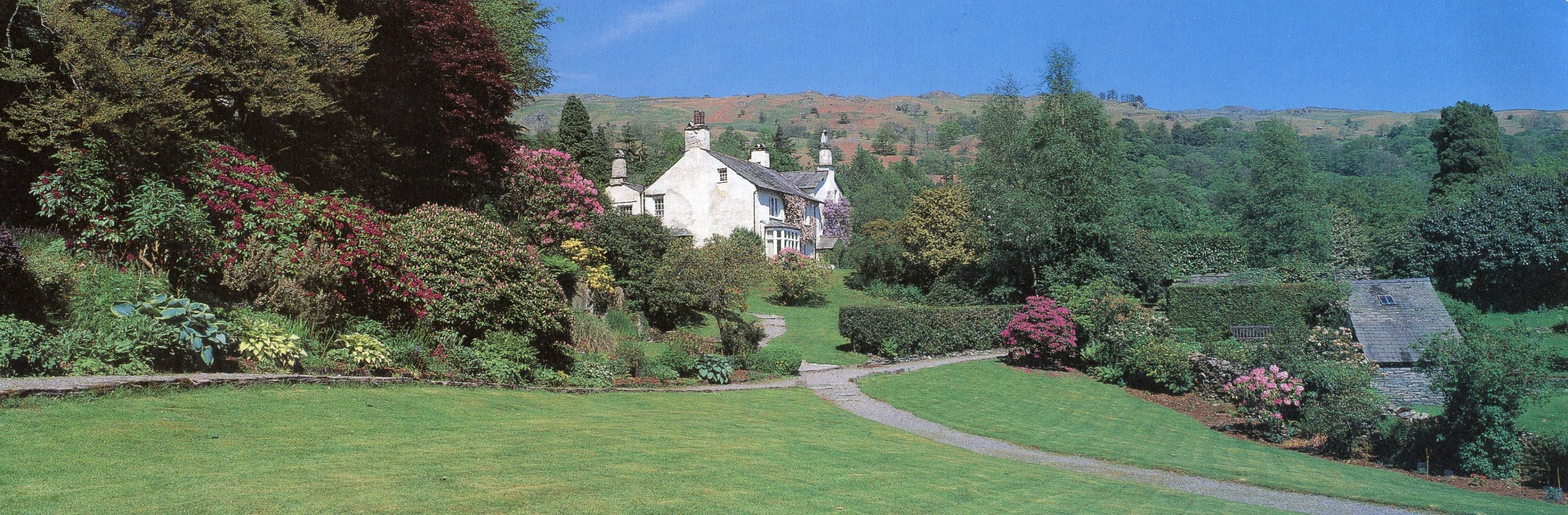
A panoramic photograph of Rydal Mount

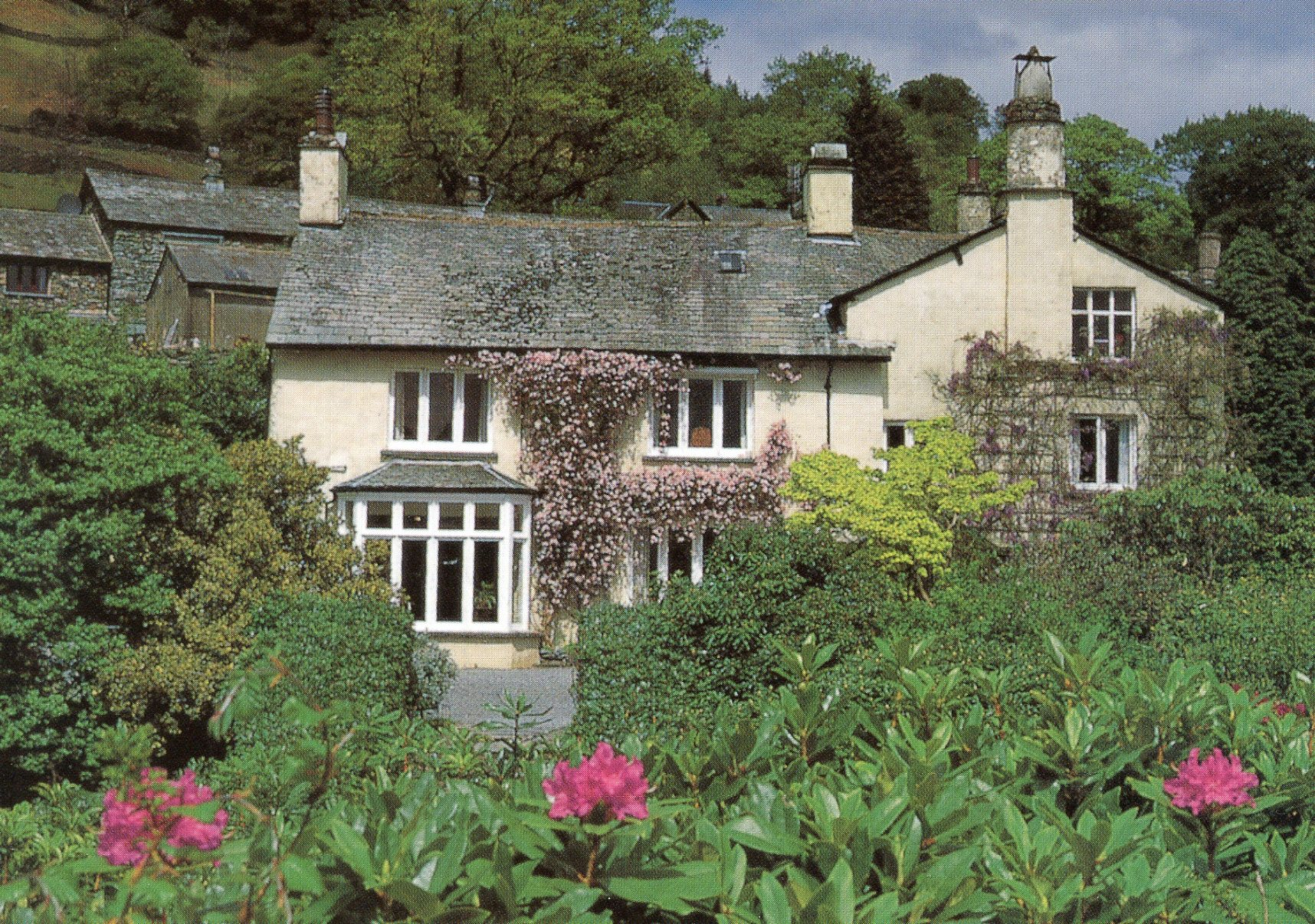
Gardens landscaped by William Wordsworth

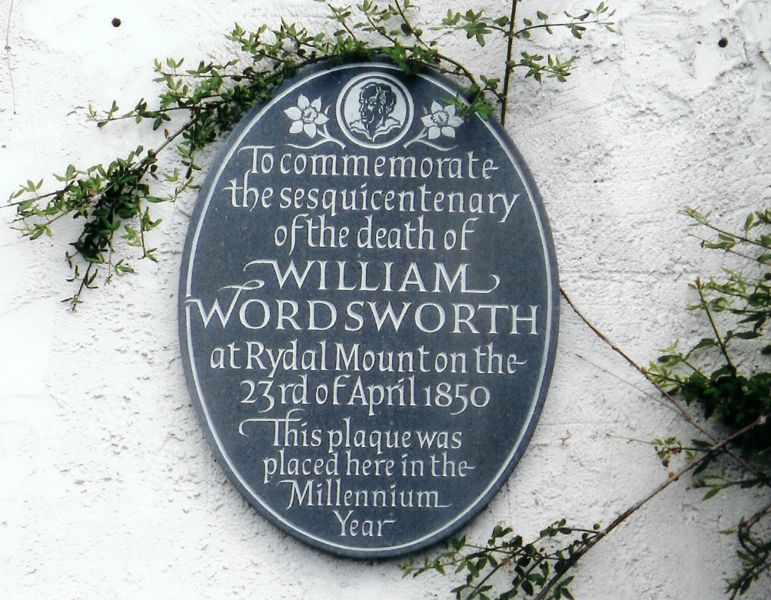
A commemorative plaque in the poet's house by John Shaw

== See also ==
- Grade I listed buildings in Cumbria
- Listed buildings in Lakes, Cumbria
- Rydal Hall
- Rydal Water
- Dora's Field
