= David Kindersley =

British stone letter-carver and typeface designer (1915-1995)

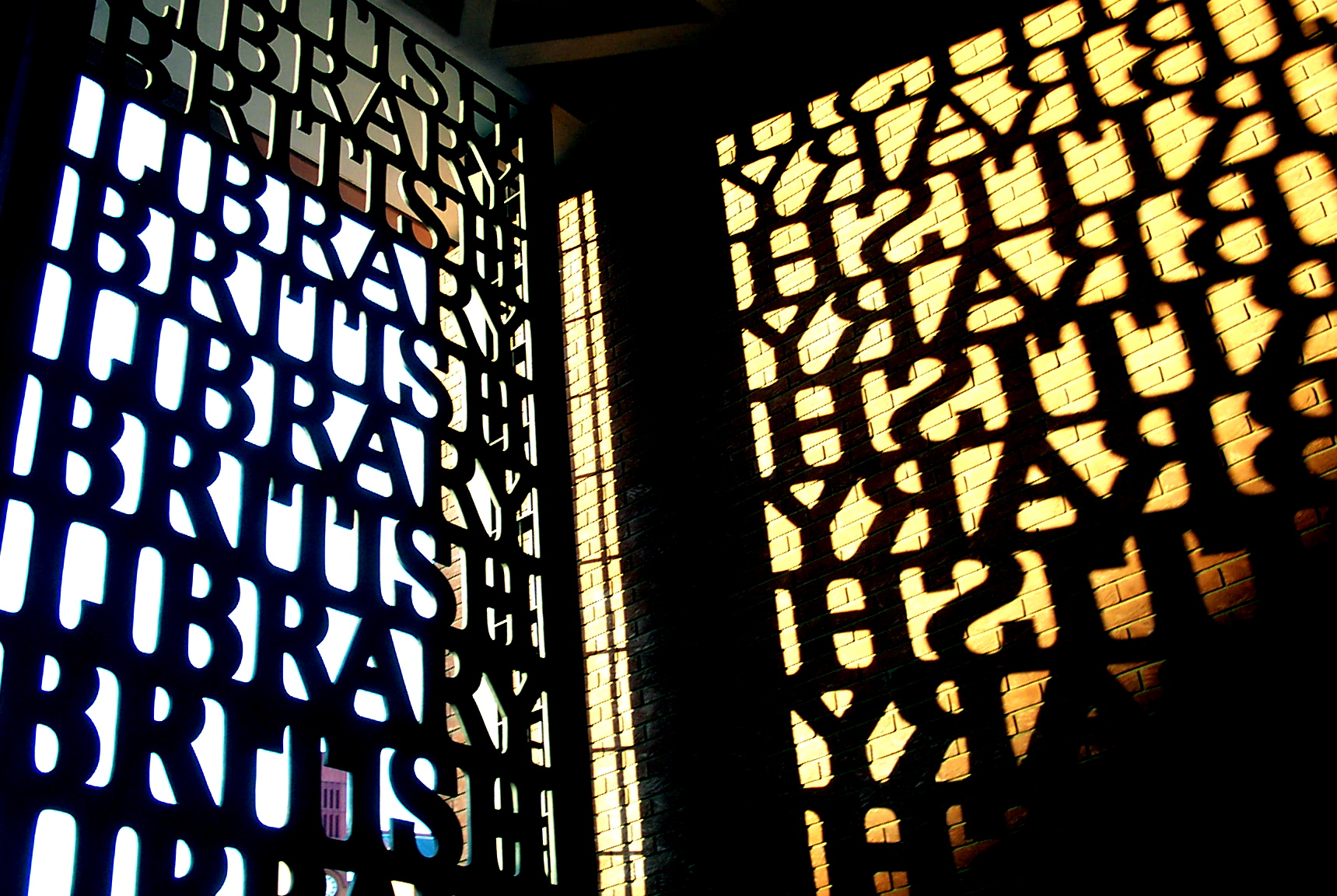
The British Library entrance gate and shadow

David Guy Barnabas Kindersley MBE (11 June 1915 – 2 February 1995) was a British stone letter-carver and typeface designer, and the founder of the Kindersley Workshop (later the Cardozo Kindersley Workshop). His carved plaques and inscriptions in stone and slate can be seen on many churches and public buildings in the United Kingdom. Kindersley was a designer of the Octavian font for Monotype Imaging in 1961, and he and his third wife Lida Lopes Cardozo designed the main gates for the British Library.

== Early life ==
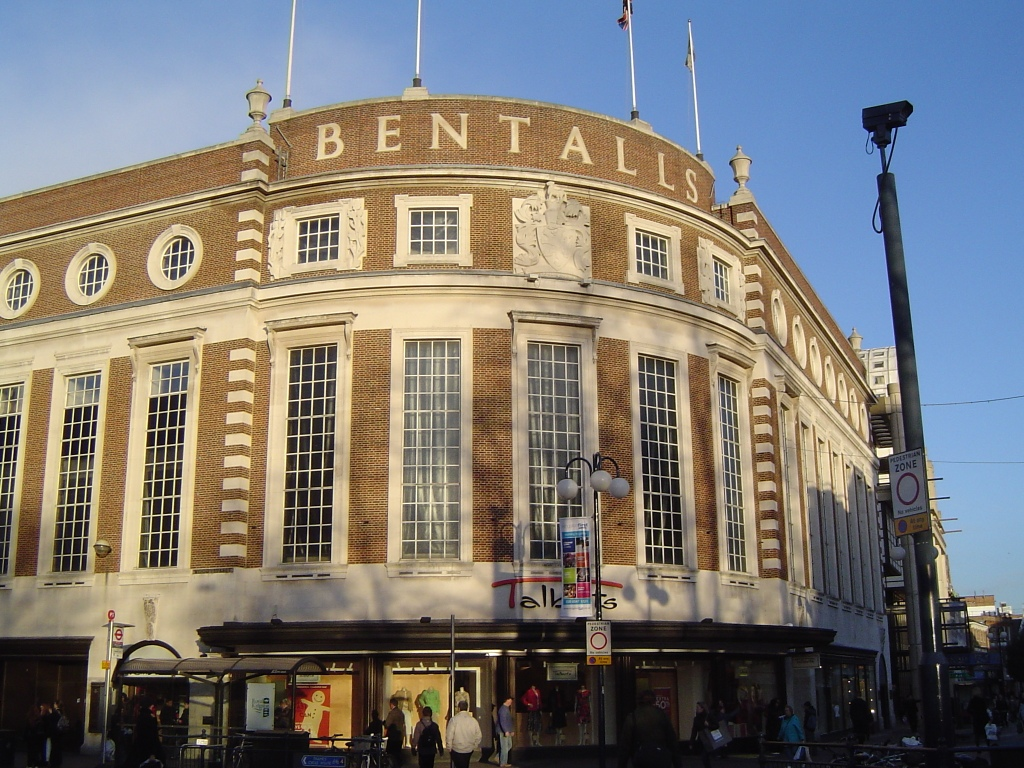
Bentalls façade in Kingston

Kindersley was born at Codicote near Hitchin, the son of Major Guy Molesworth Kindersley (a stockbroker and MP) and the grandson on his mother's side of the Arts and Crafts potter Sir Edmund Elton. He was educated at St Cyprian's School, Eastbourne, where "he had a wonderful time", becoming head boy, and the sharpness of his eye was shown by his outstanding skill at shooting.

He claimed that "aiming at the centre has always been an inherent quality with him". His elder brother, Hallam, died at Westminster School whilst Kindersley was still at St Cyprian's. Kindersley went on to Marlborough College, but left after three years because of rheumatoid arthritis.

After recovery, Kindersley was sent to Paris to learn French and study sculpture at the Academie St Julian and then with the Iduni brothers in London. He read the books of Eric Gill, and decided to become a stone-cutter. He became an apprentice to Gill in his workshop at Pigotts High Wycombe in December 1934, with the support of his father who, liking to do things the proper way, insisted on paying an apprenticeship indemnity. He worked on important commissions, including Bentall's store in Kingston upon Thames, St John's College, Oxford and Dorset House.

== Independent activity ==
Kindersley left Gill's workshop in 1936 and set up his own workshop on the River Arun, where he still worked on commission for Gill. He married his first wife, Christina Sharpe, at the beginning of World War II and ran The Smith's Arms, a tiny pub (reputed to be the smallest in England) with her in Godmanstone, Dorset.

As a conscientious objector he refused to be put in a position where he would have to kill, although he applied (and was rejected) for the Home Guard. On the death of Eric Gill in 1940, Kindersley spent time sorting out the affairs of Gill's workshop at Pigotts.

== Cambridge workshops ==
In 1945, Kindersley moved to Cambridgeshire and set up his first fully-fledged letter-cutting workshop at Dales Barn in the village of Barton.

During this time, Kindersley developed his work and methods as he broke away from Gill, in his decorative embellishments of cutting, in his growing predilection for lettering on slate and the combination of lettering with heraldry. Nevertheless, in the organisation of the workshop there was still a sense of dynastic inheritance.

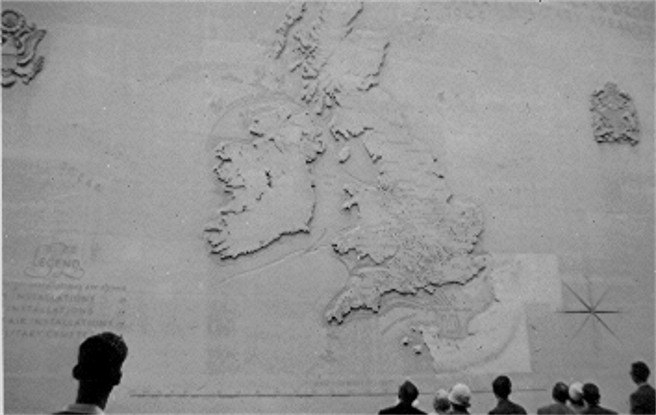
Relief maps at Cambridge American Cemetery, Madingley, 1960

At this time he also started teaching calligraphy at Cambridge Art School, having initially gone to enrol for the course. He had a major commission carving relief maps for the American War Cemetery and also became a consultant for film titles through his cousin Sir Arthur Elton who was in charge of film making at Shell Oil.

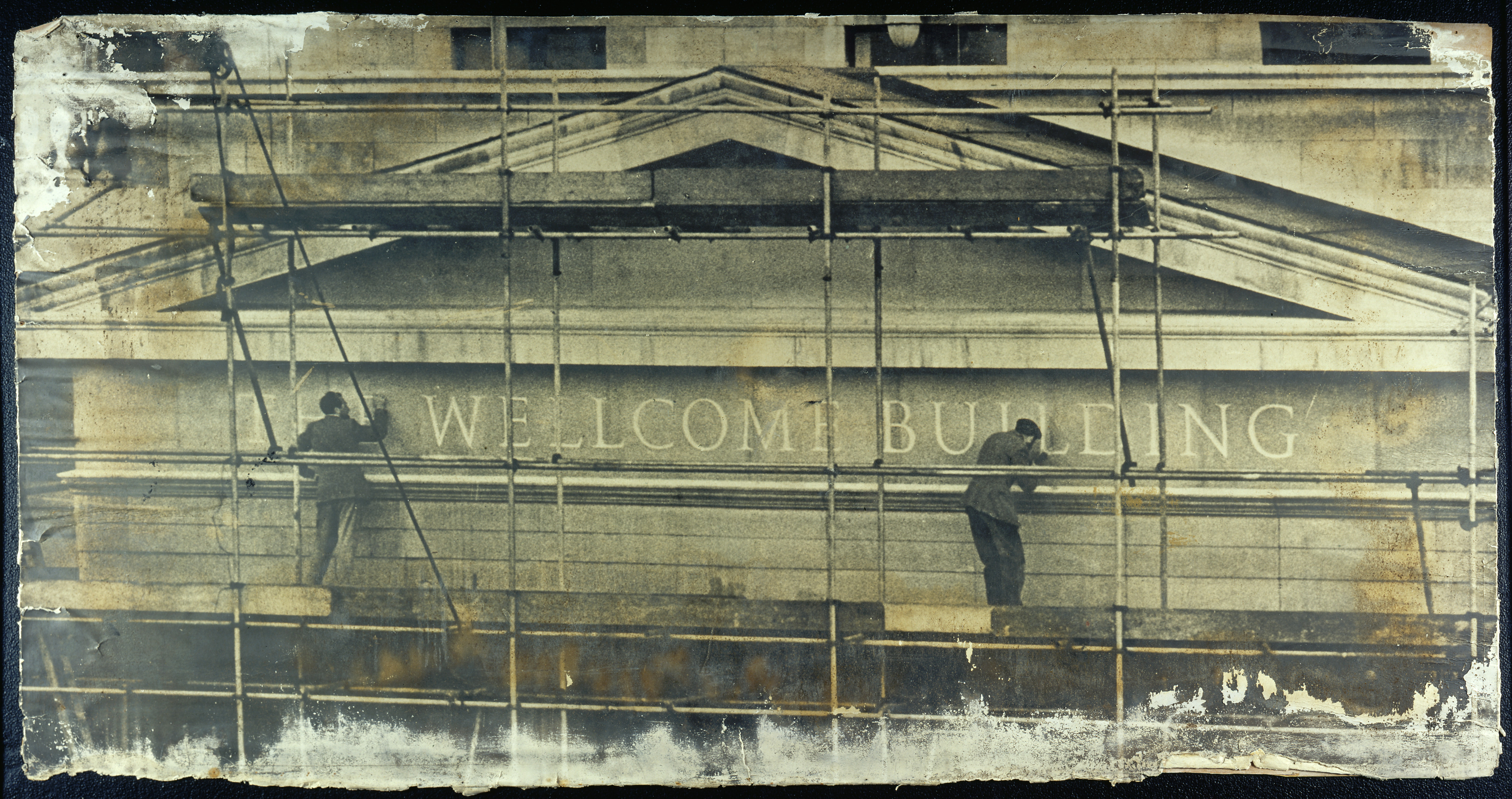
Letter cutters from David Kindersley's workshop working on the frieze of the Wellcome Building, Euston Road, London in 1956

Kindersley was preoccupied in the 1950s and 1960s by the survival of the workshop culture in a post-war climate of industrial expansion. He was a leading figure in the Designer Craftsman Society and the Crafts Council of Great Britain. He became Chairman of the Crafts Council for a while, but stepped down because of concerns about underfunding.

Kindersley invented a system for the accurate spacing of letters, which has not seen wide adoption. Kindersley's work in this area formed the basis of an artist's project by his former assistant the calligrapher Owen Williams called Testing David. In 1952 he submitted a design, MoT Serif, to the British Ministry of Transport, which required new lettering to use on United Kingdom road signs. Although the Road Research Laboratory found Kindersley's design slightly more legible, the all-capitals design with serifs was passed over in favour of the lowercase sans-serif font Transport, designed by Jock Kinneir and Margaret Calvert, for aesthetic reasons.

Many of the street signs in the UK including streets in Cambridge, use Kindersley fonts. Among his apprentices of this period was his son Richard Kindersley, who has continued the lettering tradition from his own workshop in London since 1970.

In 2005 the Cardozo Kindersley Workshop created the digital typeface Kindersley Street (a.k.a. Kindersley Grand Arcade) for the Grand Arcade in Cambridge. This is an official revival of MoT Serif with a newly designed lower-case.

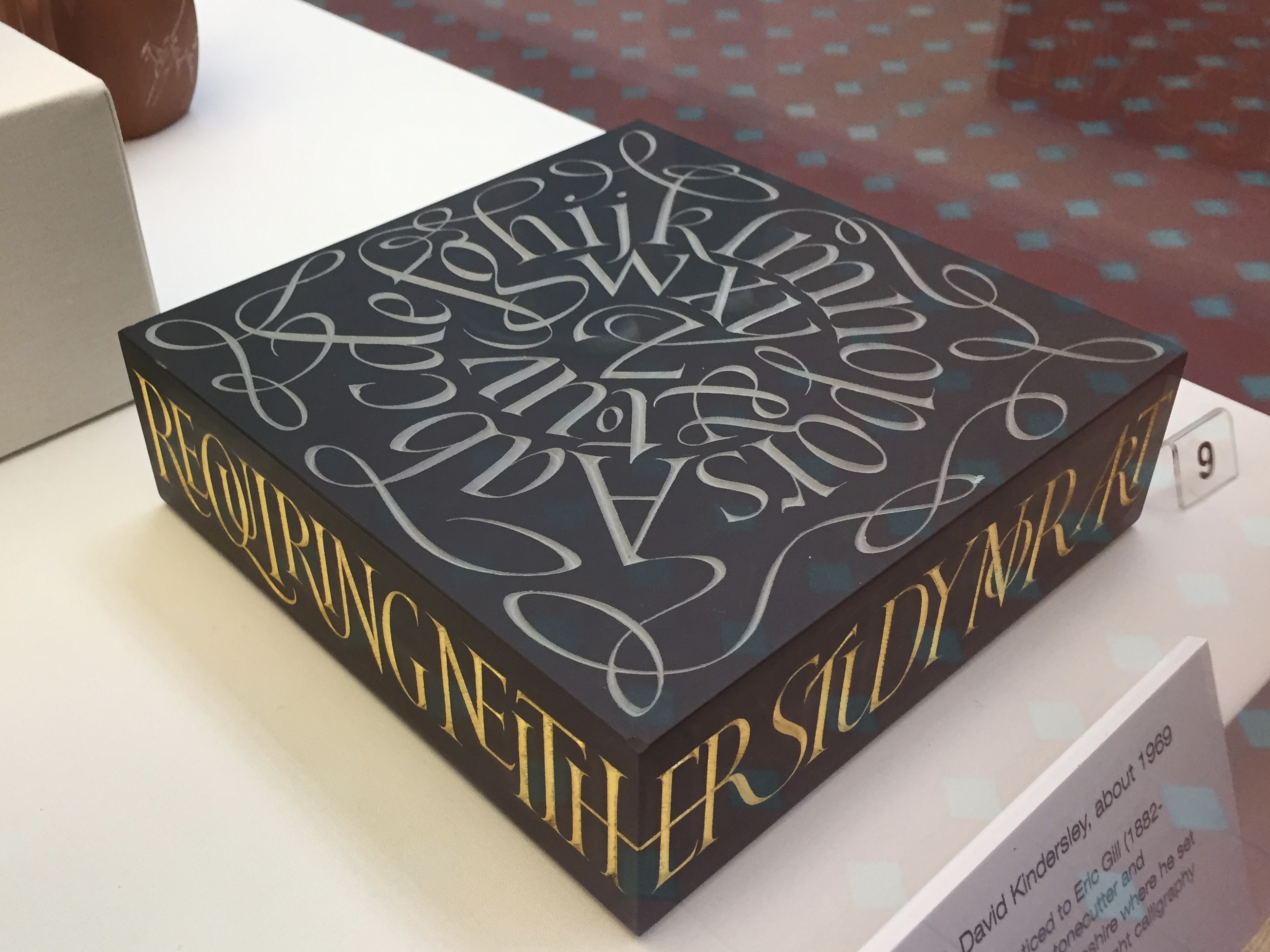
Block, Slate, David Kindersley ca. 1969

In 1967 Kindersley moved the workshop from Barton to the 14th-century Chesterton Tower in Cambridge and then, ten years later, to the converted infants' school in Victoria Road where his widow Lida continues to run the workshop and take on apprentices.

Kindersley was not formally religious, but had a strongly contemplative side. He had an essentially spiritual view of the workshop and his ideas of wholeness as the integration of home and work was a development of Gill's "cell of good living in the chaos of our world". Kindersley was deeply influenced by the writings of the Russian philosopher P. D. Ouspensky and for a time a member of the Walker Group, an Ouspenskyist self-help discussion group in London. His book Graphic Sayings also shows plates bearing sayings of the Sufi mystics from the works of the writer Idries Shah.

In January 2000 a memorial plaque designed by Kindersley's widow Lida was unveiled at Addenbrooke's Hospital, joining more than 20 other plaques and inscriptions created by the Cardozo Kindersley Workshop. The first plaque had commemorated the opening of the new hospital in 1962.

== Personal life ==
Kindersley's children by his first marriage include Peter Kindersley, co-founder of Dorling Kindersley publishers, and sculptor Richard Kindersley.

Kindersley's children with his last wife, Lida Lopes Cardozo Kindersley.

== Publications ==
- David Kindersley (1971). Graphic Sayings. Cambridge: Kindersley & Skelton. No ISBN.
- David Kindersley (1976). Optical letter spacing for new printing systems Lund Humphries, 2nd Edition.
- David Kindersley and Lida Lopes Cardozo (1981). Letters Slate Cut: workshop practice and the making of letters. London: Lund Humphries. ISBN 0-85331-429-2.

== See also ==
- Eric Gill
- Lida Lopes Cardozo Kindersley
