= List of loughs of England =

Lough is the name given to many lakes in the far north of England in the counties of Northumberland and Cumbria they are often located near the Whin Sill escarpment on which Hadrian's Wall runs. In northern England the word lough in this context is usually pronounced as 'loff'. This reflects the loss in modern standard English of the guttural 'ch' sound (as in Scottish 'loch') which in middle English was represented by 'gh' (as it still is in modern Hiberno-English and Ulster Scots).

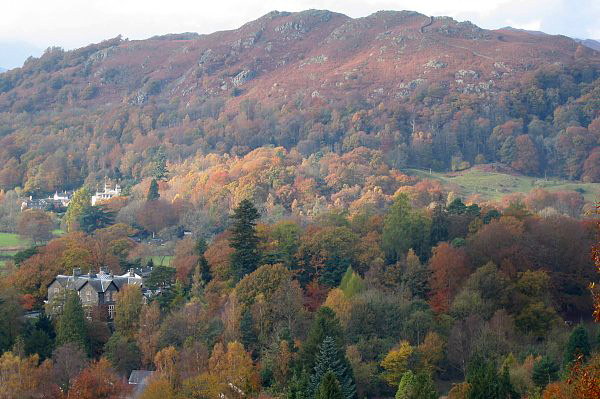
Loughrigg fell

On Haughton Common, near Hadrian's Wall

- Broomlee Lough
- Crag Lough
- Greenlee Lough
- Grindon Lough
- Halleypike Lough

Elsewhere in Northumberland

- Black Lough, Northumberland
- Blackaburn Lough
- Blaxter Lough
- Coldmartin Lough
- Darden Lough
- Harbottle Lough
- Kimmer Lough
- Little Lough
- Sweethope Loughs
- Whitfield Lough
- The Lough, on Lindisfarne

In the Lake District and Cumbria

- Loughrigg Tarn, and the hill Loughrigg Fell, possibly named after it.

Elsewhere in Cumbria

- Monkhill Lough
- Thorngill-Lough, North Pennines
- Thurstonfield Lough

In County Durham

- Beacon Lough, Gateshead, may refer to the small lake known as Hazlett’s Pond which once lay at the foot of Beacon Hill.
