= Brathay =

Village in Cumbria, England

Coordinates: 54.421°N 02.977°W

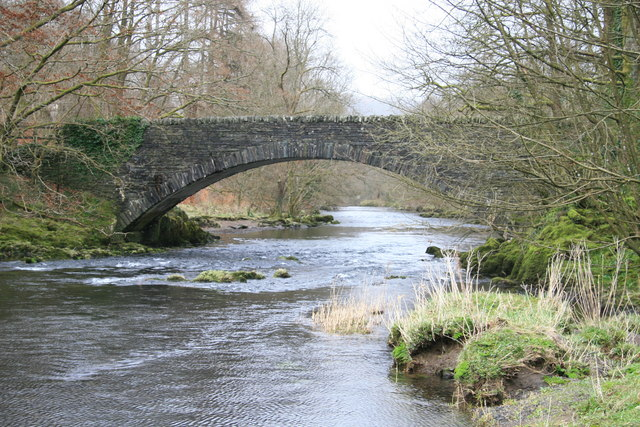
- Brathay Bridge, looking downriver

- Location in South Lakeland Location within Cumbria
- OS grid reference: NY366033
- Civil parish: Skelwith
- Unitary authority: Westmorland and Furness
- Ceremonial county: Cumbria
- Region: North West
- Country: England
- Sovereign state: United Kingdom
- Post town: AMBLESIDE
- Postcode district: LA22
- Dialling code: 01539
- Police: Cumbria
- Fire: Cumbria
- Ambulance: North West
- UK Parliament: Westmorland and Lonsdale

Brathay is a hamlet in Skelwith parish in Cumbria, England. Historically part of Lancashire, the hamlet lies close to Clappersgate on the south bank of the River Brathay, and is about 0.9 miles (1.5 km) south west of Ambleside.

Brathay Hall is a country house from the late 18th century. The house and the surrounding estate belong to a charity, the Brathay Trust.

== See also ==
- Listed buildings in Skelwith
