= Holy Trinity Church, Brathay =

Coordinates: 54.4211°N 2.9844°W

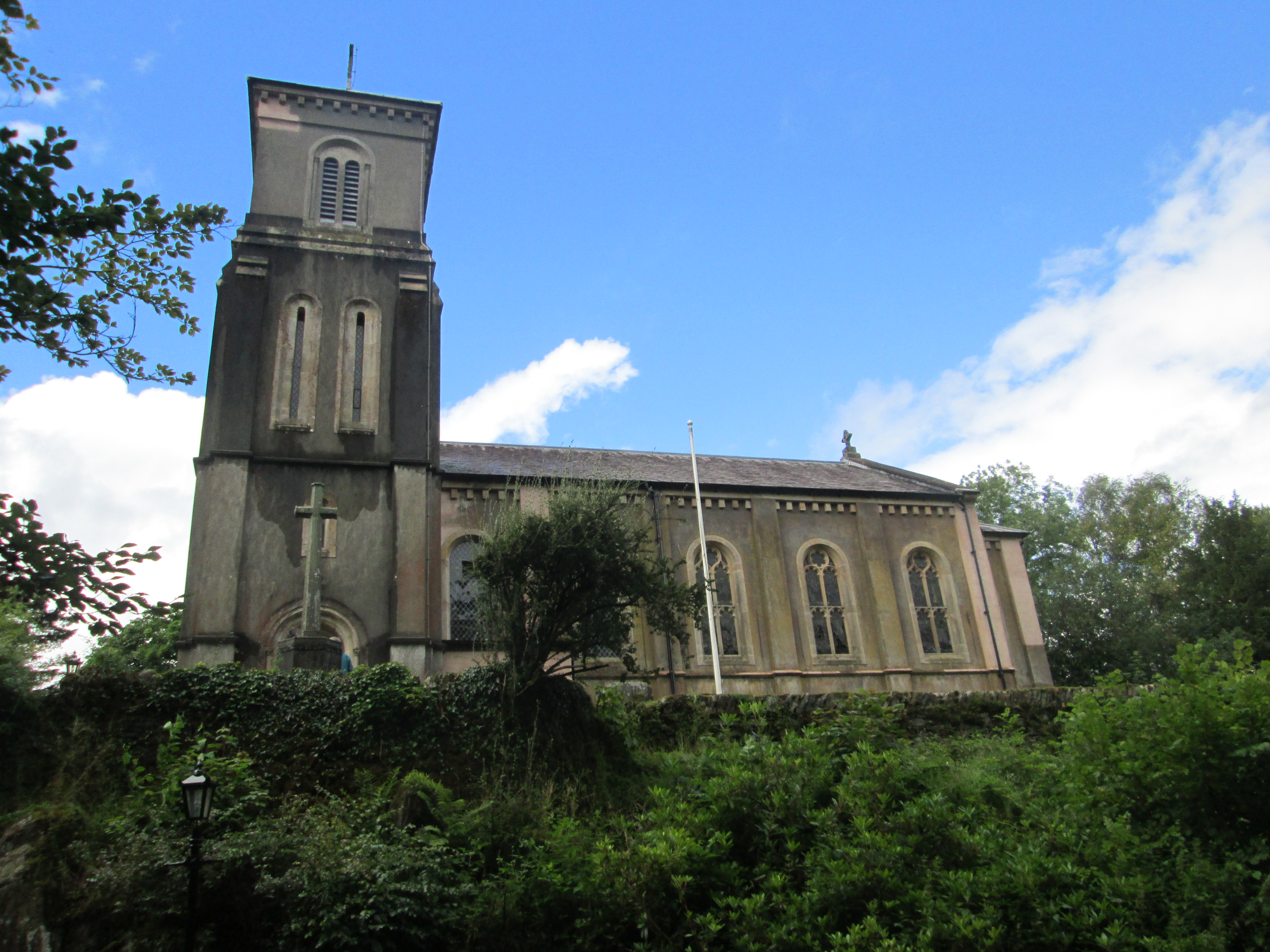
- Holy Trinity Church, Brathay

- Location in Cumbria
- OS grid reference: NY 362,033
- Location: Bog Lane, Brathay, Cumbria
- Country: England
- Denomination: Anglican
- Website: holytrinitybrathay.org.uk

History
- Status: Parish church
- Founded: 1836
- Founder: Giles Redmayne

Architecture
- Functional status: Active
- Heritage designation: Grade II
- Designated: 25 March 1970
- Architect: John Latham (?)
- Architectural type: Church
- Style: Romanesque Revival

Specifications
- Materials: Stucco with stone dressings Slate roof

Administration
- Province: York
- Diocese: Carlisle
- Archdeaconry: Westmorland and Furness
- Deanery: Windermere
- Parish: Brathay

Clergy
- Rector: Revd Beverley Lock
- Vicar: Revd Nick Hallam

Holy Trinity Church is in Bog Lane in the village of Brathay, Cumbria, England. It is an active Anglican parish church in the deanery of Windermere, the archdeaconry of Westmorland and Furness, and the diocese of Carlisle. The church is recorded in the National Heritage List for England as a designated Grade II listed building. The hilltop site for the church was recommended by William Wordsworth who, when describing it in a letter in 1836, said "there is no situation out of the Alps, nor among them, more beautiful than that where this building is placed".

== History ==
Holy Trinity was built in 1836 with funds from Giles Redmayne, the owner of nearby Brathay Hall. Redmayne, who had bought the Brathay estate a few years previously, was a successful draper, who had a shop on London's fashionable Bond Street. The architectural historian Nikolaus Pevsner described the design chosen by Redmayne as "joyless": the architect is thought to have been John Latham, together with Redmayne himself. The church was consecrated in October 1836 by the bishop of Chester, whose diocese at that time extended as far north as the Lake District. Additions were made to the church in 1905 by the Lancaster architects Austin and Paley.

== Architecture ==
=== Exterior ===
The church has a stuccoed exterior with stone dressing and a slate roof. Its architectural style is Romanesque. It is orientated north–south (in the following description the liturgical directions are given). The plan consists of a six-bay nave, a short chancel with a north vestry, and a tower at the southwest corner. Around the church are pilaster buttresses, and a corbelled frieze. The tower is in three stages. In the bottom stage is a west round-headed window and a north doorway. The middle stage contains two slots on each side, and the top stage two-light round-headed louvred bell openings. Along the sides of the nave are more round-headed windows. At the west end are three round-headed windows, the central being taller with two lights, and the flanking windows with a single light. At the northwest corner is a square pinnacle. The east window has three lights.

=== Interior ===
Inside the church is an inscribed octagonal font carried on a squat round shaft. The chancel contains panelling, and there is a reredos behind the altar. The stained glass in the east window dates from 1916, and is by Powells. On the south wall are three windows dating from about 1910, designed by Revd E. Geldart and made by Taylor and Clifton. There is a ring of six bells, cast in 1836 by Thomas Mears II of the Whitechapel Bell Foundry. The organ is by Wordsworth, a firm from Leeds.

== Present day ==
The benefice is united with those of St Mary, Ambleside, and Holy Trinity, Langdale. Together with the Mission Chapel, Little Langdale, and the Ambleside Baptist Church, the churches form the Loughrigg Team Ministry.

In 2011 there was a major restoration of the building and its facilities. The church has become a venue for musical events, in addition to holding services each Sunday.

== See also ==
- Listed buildings in Skelwith
- List of ecclesiastical works by Austin and Paley (1895–1914)
