= Skelwith =

Civil parish in Cumbria, England

Coordinates: 54.4131°N 3.0208°W

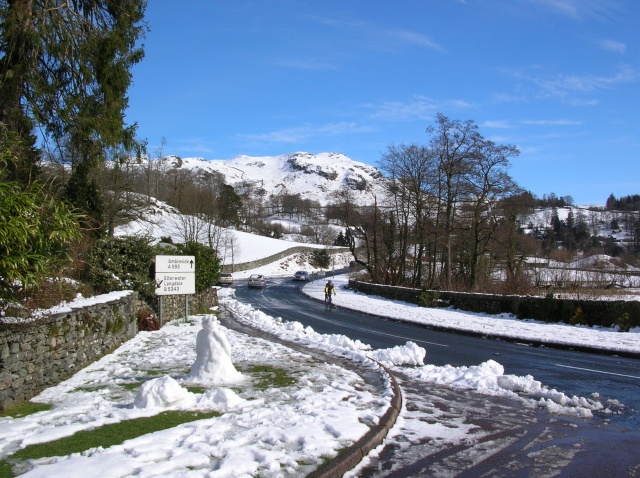
The A593 road in the parish in March 2008

Skelwith is a civil parish in Westmorland and Furness, Cumbria, England, which includes the village of Skelwith Bridge. In the 2001 census the parish had a population of 185, decreasing at the 2011 census to 155. It has a parish council. The parish lies west of the northern end of Windermere. Historically, Skelwith is the northernmost settlement in Lancashire.

There are 16 listed buildings or structures in the parish, including the Church of Holy Trinity and a grade II* listed group of three houses.

== See also ==
- Listed buildings in Skelwith
