= Listed buildings in Skelwith =

Skelwith is a civil parish in Westmorland and Furness, Cumbria, England. It contains 17 listed buildings that are recorded in the National Heritage List for England. Of these, one is listed at Grade II*, the middle of the three grades, and the others are at Grade II, the lowest grade. The parish is in the Lake District National Park. The only settlement of significant size is the village of Skelwith Bridge, the rest of the parish being rural. Most of the listed buildings are houses with associated structures, and farmhouses and farm buildings. The other listed buildings are a church and a bridge.

== Key ==
Grade	Criteria
II*	Particularly important buildings of more than special interest
II	Buildings of national importance and special interest

== Buildings ==
Name and location	Photograph	Date	Notes	Grade
High Park Cottages; 54.41679°N 3.04442°W	—	17th century (probable)	Two cottages and an outbuilding, they are in stone with a slate roof. There are two storeys, four bays, and an outbuilding to the left. Most of the windows are casements, there are two fire windows, and at the rear is a mullioned window.	II
High Park Farmhouse and outbuilding 54.41694°N 3.04452°W		17th century	The house and outbuilding are in stone with slate roofs. The house has two storeys, three bays, a lean-to outhouse on the left, and at the rear is an 18th-century kitchen wing, with the outbuilding attached. The windows are casements with hood moulds, and above the central doorway is a slate gabled canopy. The outbuilding includes a barn at the end.	II
Bull Close, Bull Close Cottage and Barn End; 54.41345°N 3.00716°W	—	Late 17th century	A row of three stone houses with a slate roof, hipped to the left. There are two storeys and six bays. The windows are casements, those in the first three bays with slate-hung lintels. In front of the fourth bay is a lean-to extension.	II*
The Brow; 54.41594°N 3.01273°W	—	Late 17th century	A stone house with a slate roof, two storeys, two bays, and a 19th-century rear extension. The windows on the front are casements, some are mullioned, and in the extension they are sashes. Inside there are two cruck trusses.	II
High Arnside Farmhouse and cottage 54.40643°N 3.03011°W	—	1697	Two stone houses with a slate roof, two storeys, five bays, and a rear gabled projection. There are two doorways, one with a gabled porch. The windows are casements, and there is a fire window.	II
Manor Cottage and Old Manor House; 54.41644°N 3.00196°W	—	c. 1725	Two stone houses with a slate roof, two storeys, five bays, and a one-bay wing at the rear. In the second bay is a gabled porch. Most of the windows are casements, some are sashes, one is mullioned, and there are two fire windows.	II
Hodge Close; 54.40765°N 3.05309°W		Early 18th century	A stone house with one slate wall and a slate roof, it has two storeys, two bays, and a rear outshut. On the front is a lean-to porch, and the windows are casements and two fire windows.	II
Holme Ground Cottage, barn, and stable 54.40153°N 3.06225°W	—	Early 18th century	The house and outbuildings are in stone with slate roofs. The house has two storeys, two bays, a slate gabled canopy over the doorway, and casement windows. The stable to the left has a doorway and flanking windows with a hood mould, and a crow-stepped gable. The barn and cow house are at right angles to the right.	II
Low Arnside Farmhouse and barn 54.40816°N 3.02824°W		Early 18th century	The farmhouse and barn are in stone with slate roofs. The house has two storeys, three bays, and a lean-to extension at the rear. Above the door is a slate gabled canopy, and the windows are mullioned. The barn has barn doors and a blocked winnowing door.	II
Old Farmhouse and Old Farm Cottage; 54.41701°N 3.00238°W		Early 18th century	Two houses and an outbuilding in stone, the houses roughcast, and with a slate roof. The houses have two storeys, four bays, and an outshut and a wing at the rear. The windows in the first bay are casements, and elsewhere they are sashes. There is a gabled porch in the third bay. The outbuilding to the right has one storey and contains a doorway, a sash window, and two garage doors.	II
High Oxen Fell Farmhouse; 54.40813°N 3.04399°W		18th century (possible)	A stone farmhouse with a slate roof, two storeys, four bays, a lean-to extension on the left, and two rear gabled wings. On the front is an open gabled porch with benches. The windows are casements with a hood mould above. At the rear, steps lead to an upper floor doorway.	II
Bee boles, Holme Ground House; 54.40166°N 3.06271°W	—	18th century (possible)	The bee boles are in a drystone wall enclosing a field to the rear of the farmhouse, and consist of five recesses.	II
Low Oxen Fell; 54.40975°N 3.03853°W	—	18th century	A stone house that has a slate roof with coped gables. There are two storeys, two bays, and a rear outshut. On the front is a gabled porch, and the windows are casements, with a hood mould above the ground floor windows.	II
Low Oxen Fell Cottage; 54.40952°N 3.03945°W		18th century	A small stone house with a slate roof. one storey and two bays. On the front is a timber porch, and the windows are casements.	II
Brathay Hall; 54.41950°N 2.97789°W		1794–96	A country house in Georgian style, later used for other purposes, built in sandstone with hipped slate roofs. The central block has three storeys and five bays, and is flanked by wings with one storey and attics, and three bays. The windows are sashes, there is a French window in the right wing, and the three-light stair window at the rear. On the front is a semicircular portico with four unfluted Doric columns with leaf capitals, a frieze, a cornice, and a blocking course.	II
Holy Trinity Church; 54.42109°N 2.98438°W		1836	The church is stuccoed with stone dressings, pilaster buttresses, a corbelled frieze, and a slate roof with coped gables on the nave and a hipped roof on the chancel. It consists of a nave, a short chancel with a north vestry and organ loft, and a southwest tower. The tower has three stages, set-back buttresses, string courses, and a south entrance. The windows in the nave have round heads, and the east window has three lights.	II
Skelwith Bridge; 54.42155°N 3.01175°W		Uncertain	The bridge carries the A593 road over the River Brathay. It is in stone and has two segmental arches, with triangular cutwaters and solid and almost flat parapets.	II
