= Brathay Trust =

UK charitable organization

- Formation: 1946
- Location: Ambleside, Cumbria
- Region served: Cumbria, Lancashire, West Yorkshire, South Yorkshire
- Website: www.brathay.org.uk

Brathay Trust is a youth-development charity with its head office and residential centre based at Brathay in Cumbria, England. Founded in 1946 by Francis C. Scott, the charity is based at the Brathay Hall and estate near the town of Ambleside. The charity's mission is to transform the lives of young people in need. Methods include outdoor education and experiential learning, but also delivers people and organisation development courses for adults. In 2007, the trust began holding the Brathay Windermere Marathon, a now annual charity marathon.

== History ==
=== Early years of the Trust ===
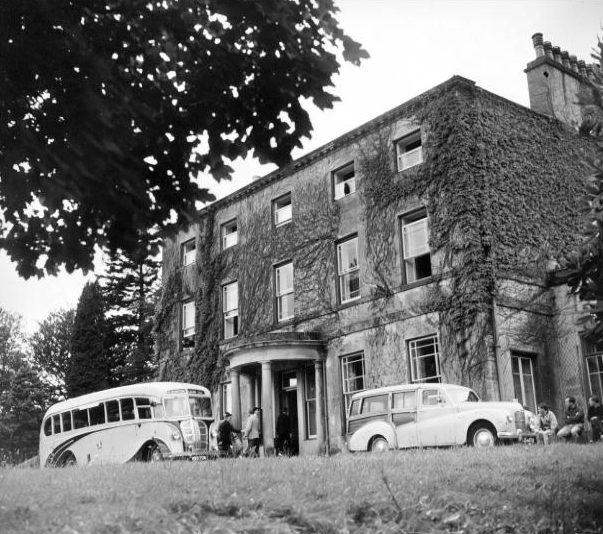
Image of Brathay Hall from the early days of Brathay Hall Trust.

In 1939, Francis Scott of the Provincial Insurance Company in Kendal, purchased Brathay Hall estate, an 18th-century country house. Scott wanted to protect the area from housing and business development and to devote the residence to a charitable cause. The events of World War II caused Scott to postpone his plans, until eventually Brathay Hall Trust was founded in 1946. Scott saw a need for a leadership training and an activity centre, so offered Brathay Hall as a base for the National Association of Boys' Clubs. He began running "Holidays with Purpose", a one-week course of outdoor education and cultural activities, including the production of newspapers and staging drama productions. The courses targeted boys from low socio-economic backgrounds who lived in cities in the north of Britain.

In 1947, the Brathay Exploration Group was founded as an offshoot of Brathay Trust by geographer Brian Ware. Boys taking part in Brathay Trust programmes who had shown promise were recommended for the course, along with schoolboys, which partnered with universities to conduct field studies. The group originated after a comment by geographer WV Lewis, who noted that many of the Lake District tarns had imperfect depth data collected on them. The group conducted glacier surveys in Yugoslavia (now Slovenia), Norway and Iceland, and ornithology surveys on Foula in the Shetland Islands, and has continued to lead data collection expeditions well into the 21st Century.

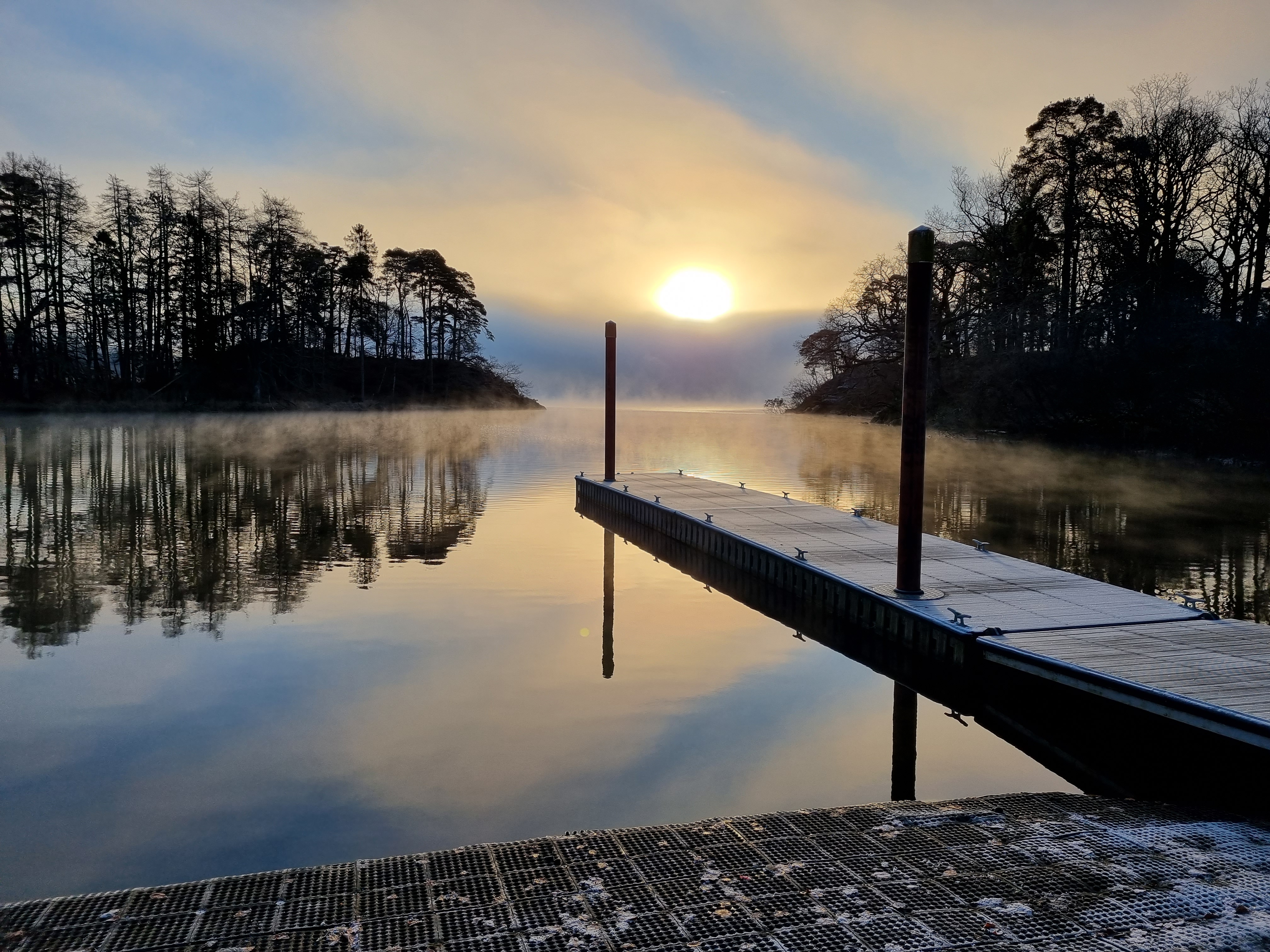
Brathay's private boat house and jetty on Windermere.

Due to the success of the single week courses, Brathay Trust launched an extended four-week course in 1950. In response to the increased demand for programmes, Scott decided to finance many additions to the Brathay estate, including a boathouse, a theatre and extra dormitories. Brathay sought to distinguish itself from the outdoor oriented charity Outward Bound, by focusing on a much broader range of activities. These courses were created after consultation with northern British industrial firms, who supported the courses as a way to bring out latent talent with the facilitation of well-rounded development for the youth of Postwar Britain. The four-week course became the basis for Brathay activities until 1975. Beginning in 1955, Brathay partnered with the Oxfordshire Education Authority to offer extended courses to schoolchildren from Oxfordshire, which blended history and geography lessons with outdoor education.

Brathay's youth courses were praised by Geoffrey Crowther, Baron Crowther, the Chairman of the Central Advisory Council for Education, in his 1949 publication The Crowther Report, and similarly in the government produced Albemarle Report. In both reports, Brathay was praised for how their outdoor and physical activities had a strong youth appeal, motivating in a different way to conventional education.

=== Course diversification ===
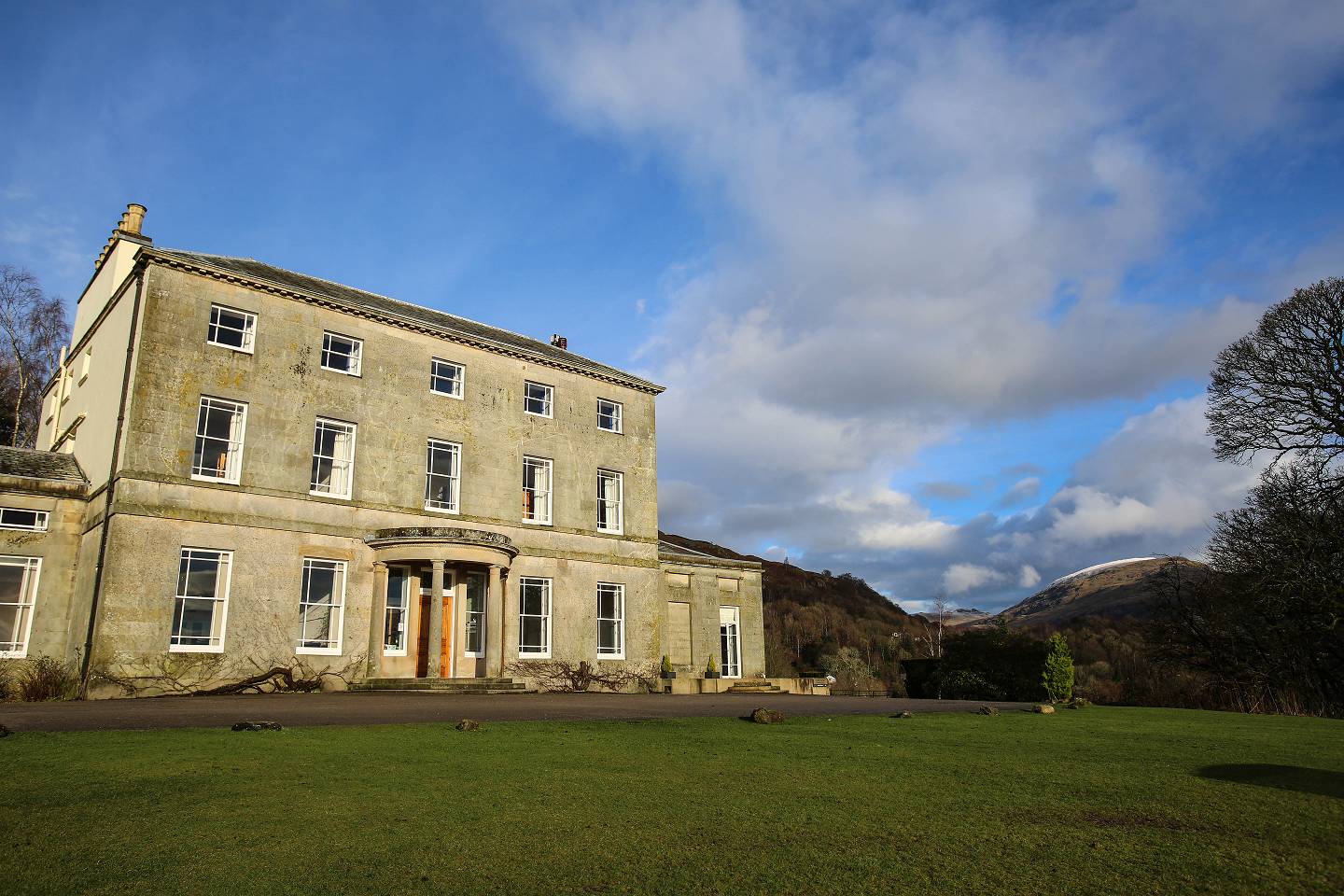
Brathay Hall, HQ of Brathay Trust, photographed in 2014.

In the mid-1960s, Brathay began to offer leadership and training and development programmes, targeted to adults from commercial companies, the government and other organisations. In 1963, the Francis C. Scott Charitable Trust was set up, with Scott's son Peter acting as the trust's chairman. The trust was a major source of funding for Brathay during its early years, though over time, Brathay became less reliant on the Scott family funds until the current position where the two trusts are entirely separate financially.

In the early 1970s, the courses were further developed by Peter Prior of Bulmers and John Adair of the Industrial Society, who saw great opportunities of developing the youth courses into industry-based adult courses. Businesses such as the John Lewis Partnership developed annual staff development courses held at Brathay. In the late 1960s with the help of the Industrial Society, Brathay's four-week courses were refocused, to relate the activities to the participants' lives, and decision making in general. In 1967, Brathay opened the Field Study Centre, a one-week academic-focused programme for schools based at Brathay Hall, which continued to run until 1986. In the 1970s and 1980s, a variety of programmes were created in the wake of increased unemployment in the United Kingdom, targeting youth skills acquisition, and youth rehabilitation. The courses were developed alongside the Trident Trust, and focused on youth who had not completed secondary school.

The trust became an Accredited Training Centre by the UK government, and in 1977 became a member of the Development Training Advisory Group, alongside Outward Bound, Endeavour Training and the YMCA. The group was a consortium that encouraged quality practices in outdoor education courses and youth training. Brathay's youth offender rehabilitation work continued on into the 1990s, where the trust worked alongside the Breakthrough Foundation.

In January 2012, Brathay Trust acquired a contract to manage two Lake District outdoor centres owned by the Wigan Metropolitan Borough Council, Low Bank Ground, close to Coniston Water and Hinning House in the Duddon Valley. Both properties had been in danger of sale or closure, and Brathay Trust will continue to manage the properties until 2019. As of 2021, Brathay no longer manages the properties.

== Brathay Hall ==
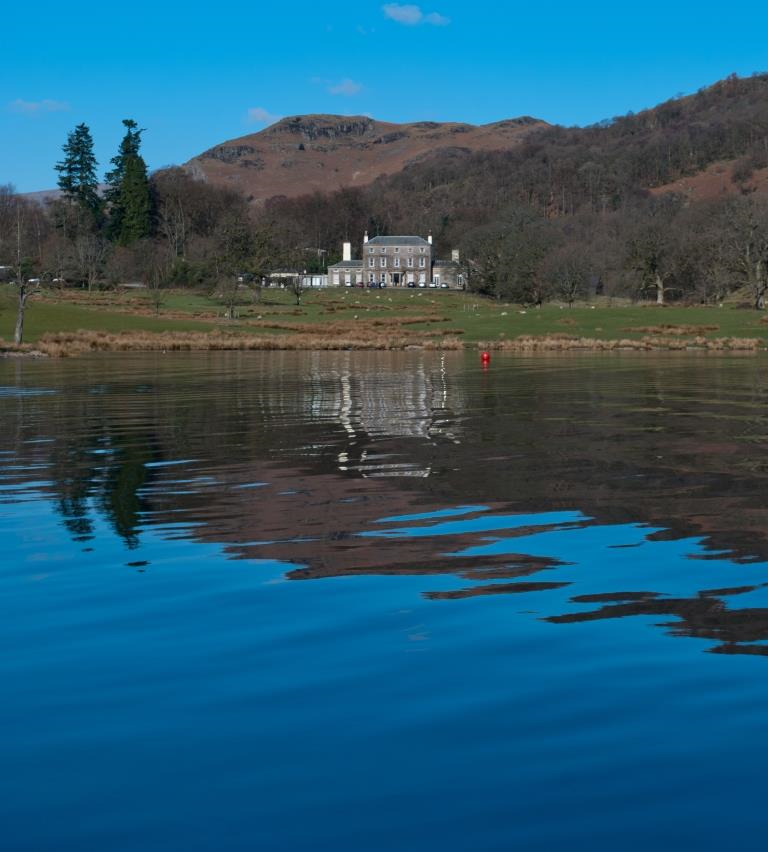
Brathay Hall and grounds from Windermere.

The Trust is based in Brathay Hall, a Georgian-style country house set on a 360-acre property close to the Ambleside village on the shores of the River Brathay. Brathay Hall is grade II listed and was built in the 18th century by George Law, the son of a lawyer who had a strong interest in the Backbarrow ironworks. After Law's death in 1802, his son Henry rented the property to John Harden, a gentleman and amateur Cumbrian artist who lived a life of leisure, entertaining guests such as poets William Wordsworth and Samuel Taylor Coleridge, and Romantic painter John Constable. Jessy's Journal, an account of the diaries of Jessy Harden, the lady of the house at that time, offers an insight to day-to-day life at that time.

In 1833, the property was sold to draper Giles Redmayne, whose family lived at the estate for almost a century. Architect Alfred Waterhouse in his early career was contracted to build Gate Lodge at Brathay Hall in 1857, and three years later became the mentor for Redmayne's fourth son, architect George Tunstal Redmayne. George Tunstal Redmayne's grandson Martin Redmayne was a politician who was created a life peer, becoming the first of the Redmayne baronets. While under the ownership of Redmayne, Thomas Arnold, headmaster of the Rugby School often holidayed at Brathay Hall with his family. The Redmayne family owned the estate until Francis Scott purchased the property in 1939.

In addition to the hall, several other buildings exist on the estate, which are used for youth accommodation. One, Old Brathay, was rented out to a member of the Lloyd family of Lloyds Bank, while the property was possessed by George Law. Brathay Trust administers several other locations, including the Bradford Youth Centre in West Yorkshire and several Lake District residences, on behalf of the Wigan Metropolitan Borough Council.

== Community activities ==
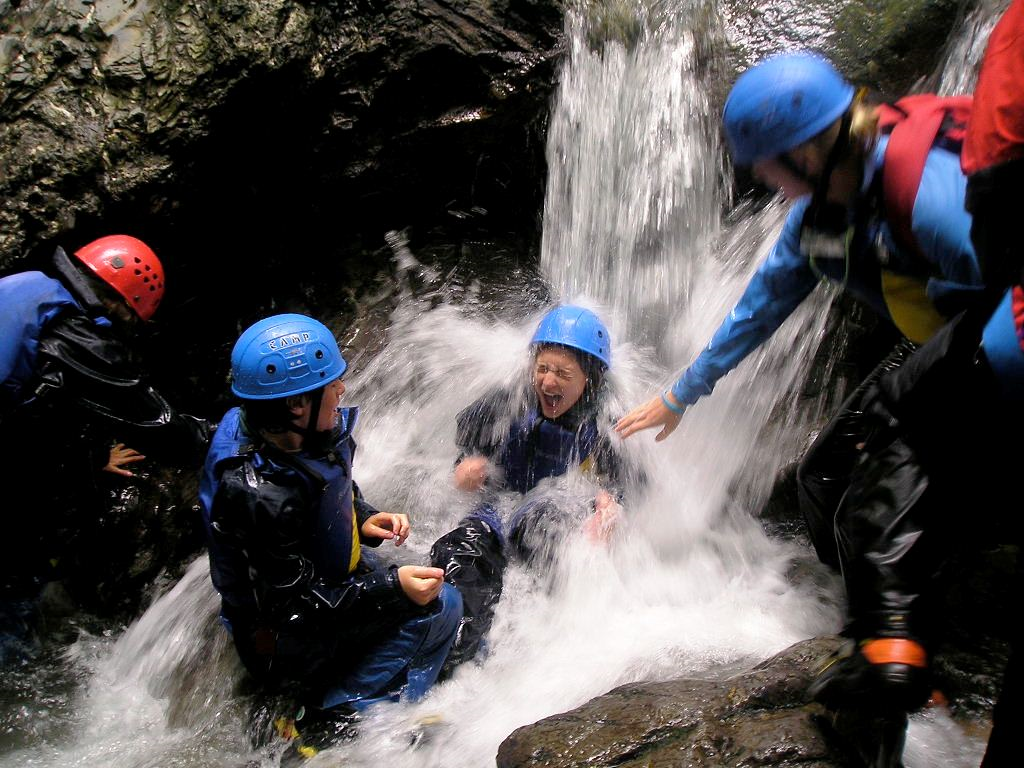
Young people on a Brathay residential programme taking part in a Ghyll Scramble.

In 1993 Brathay began collaborating with the Police and Youth Encouragement Scheme, an outreach programme pairing Merseyside youth with police officers. Courses typically last five days, and focus on building motivational skills. In 2011, the Francis C Scott Charitable Trust partnered with the University of Cumbria to begin holding the Aspiring Leaders Programme at Brathay Hall, an annual leadership event for youth from Cumbria and north Lancashire.

In 2003, Brathay secured funding from Central Government through a Youth Sector Development Fund to extend their activities through community hubs. The Trust has subsequently developed projects that run out of Youth Centres in Bradford, Sheffield, Wigan and in urban areas of Cumbria.

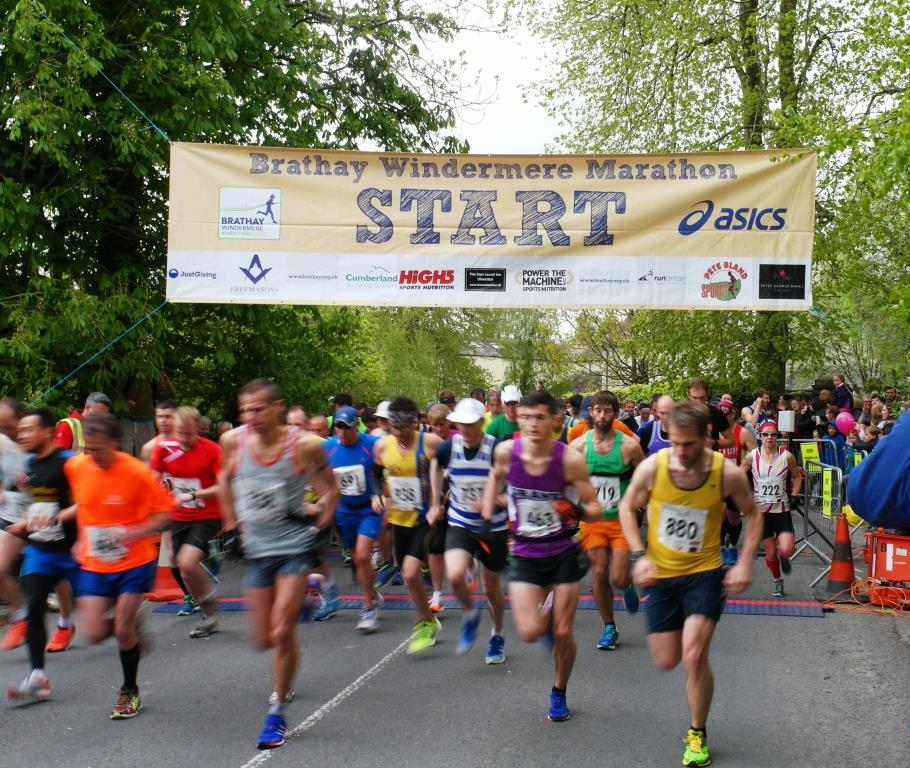
The start of the 2015 Brathay Windermere Marathon.

In 2007, Brathay became the location for courses set up by charity Future for Heroes (originally called Remount), which helps the rehabilitation for returned servicemen of the British Armed Services. In 2015, a team from Future for Heroes entered the Brathay Windermere Marathon, raising £1,000 for the charity.

Brathay Hall is one of the locations for the annual Lake District Summer Music festival, hosting a music summer school run by the festival.

=== Marathon ===
In 2007, Brathay Trust began to organise two marathon-related events, the Brathay 10in10 and the Brathay Windermere Marathon. The Brathay 10in10 is an endurance running event featuring ten marathons organised over a ten-day period, with the final one coinciding with the Brathay Windermere Marathon, an open event, which was first run as the Windermere Marathon in 1982. Entry fees for the 10in10 include the obligation for participants to raise at least £3,000 to support Brathay Trust. In 2014, fourteen runners undertook the Brathay 10in10, while 750 runners attended the Brathay Windermere Marathon. In 2015, 925 runners registered to run in the Brathay Windermere Marathon, raising an estimated £100,000.
