= Loughrigg Tarn =

Body of water in Cumbria, England

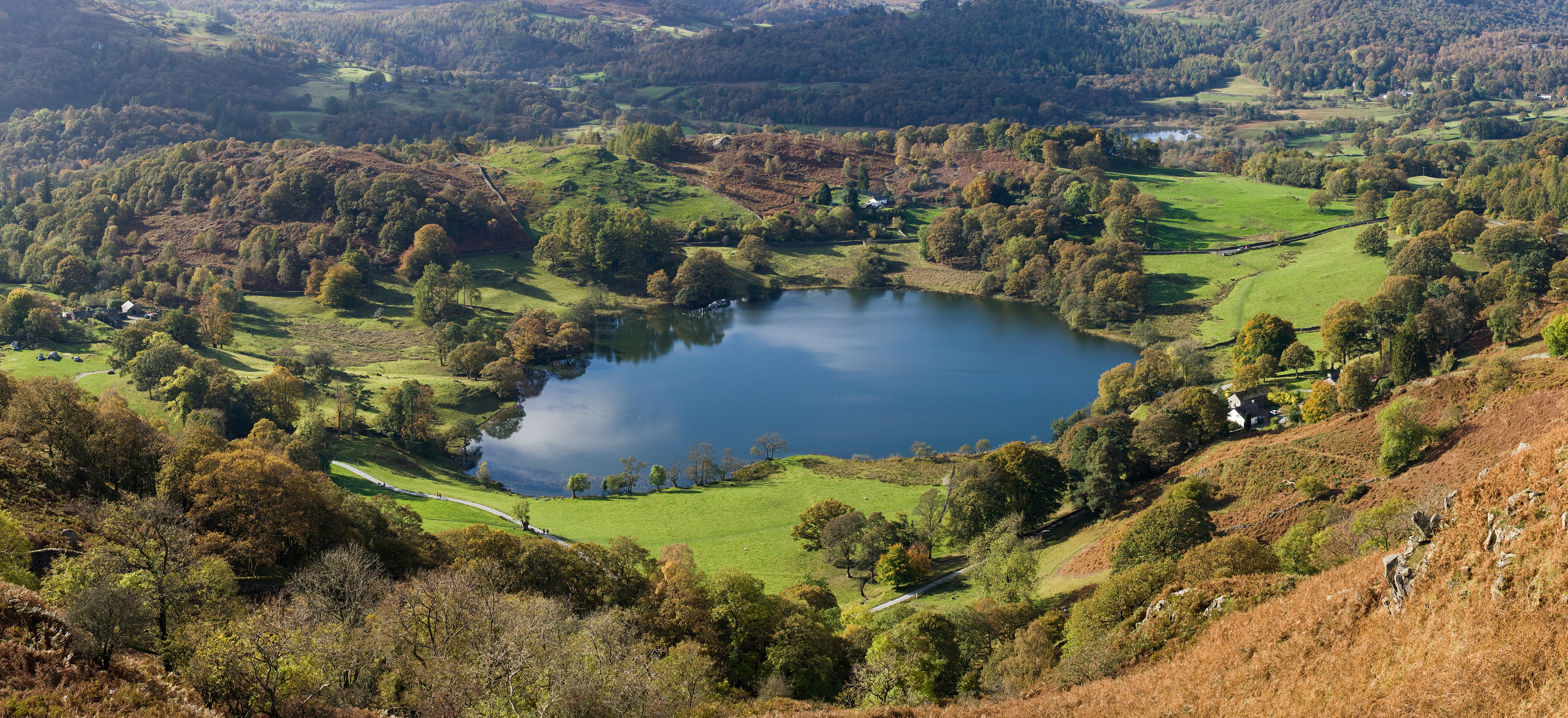
- View from Loughrigg Fell

- Location in the Lake District National Park Location in South Lakeland, Cumbria
- Location: Lake District
- Coordinates: 54°25′50″N 3°0′42″W
- Basin countries: United Kingdom
- Max. length: 0.3 km (0.19 mi)
- Max. width: 0.4 km (0.25 mi)
- Average depth: 6.9 m (23 ft)
- Max. depth: 10.3 m (34 ft)

Loughrigg Tarn (/ˌlʌfrɪɡ ˈtɑːrn/) is a small, natural lake in the Lake District, Cumbria, England. It is situated north of Windermere, just north of the village of Skelwith Bridge, and at the foot of Loughrigg Fell. "Loughrigg Tarn" is a bit of a tautology, since "loughrigg" means "ridge of the lough (lake)" and "tarn" is also the name of a body of water.

== Characteristics ==
Loughrigg Tarn was a favoured place of William Wordsworth, who, in his Epistle to Sir George Howland Beaumont Bart, likened it to “Diana’s Looking-glass... round, clear and bright as heaven," in reference to Lake Nemi, the mirror of Diana in Rome.

Alfred Wainwright notes that Loughrigg Tarn is "one of the most secluded of tarns", rarely being visible from the fells. He also identifies that Loughrigg Fell is the only Lake District fell to share its name with a tarn, although he might have overlooked Scoat Fell (Scoat Tarn) and Bowscale Fell (Bowscale Tarn).

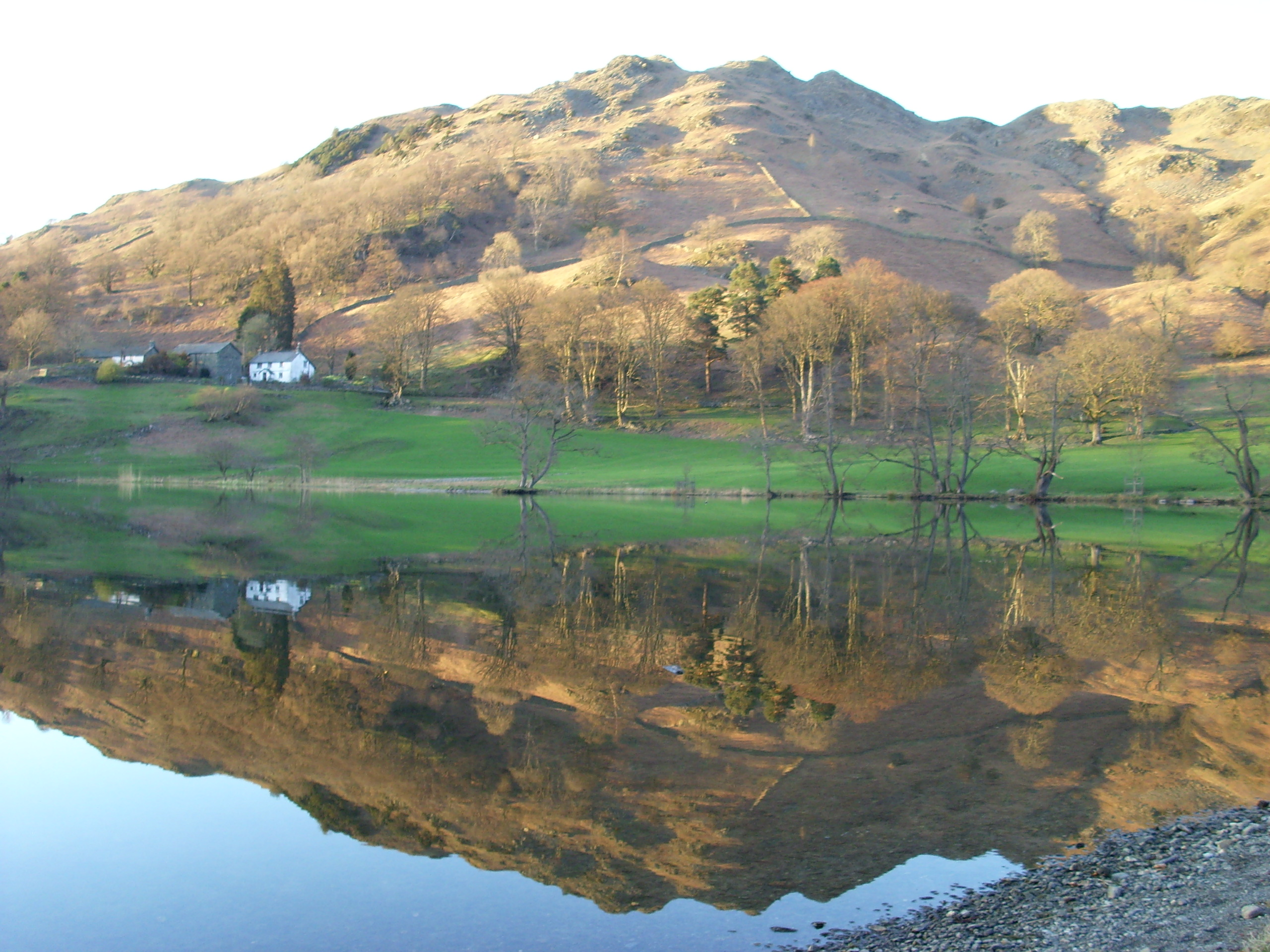
A spring reflection in Loughrigg Tarn sitting at the foot of Loughrigg Fell

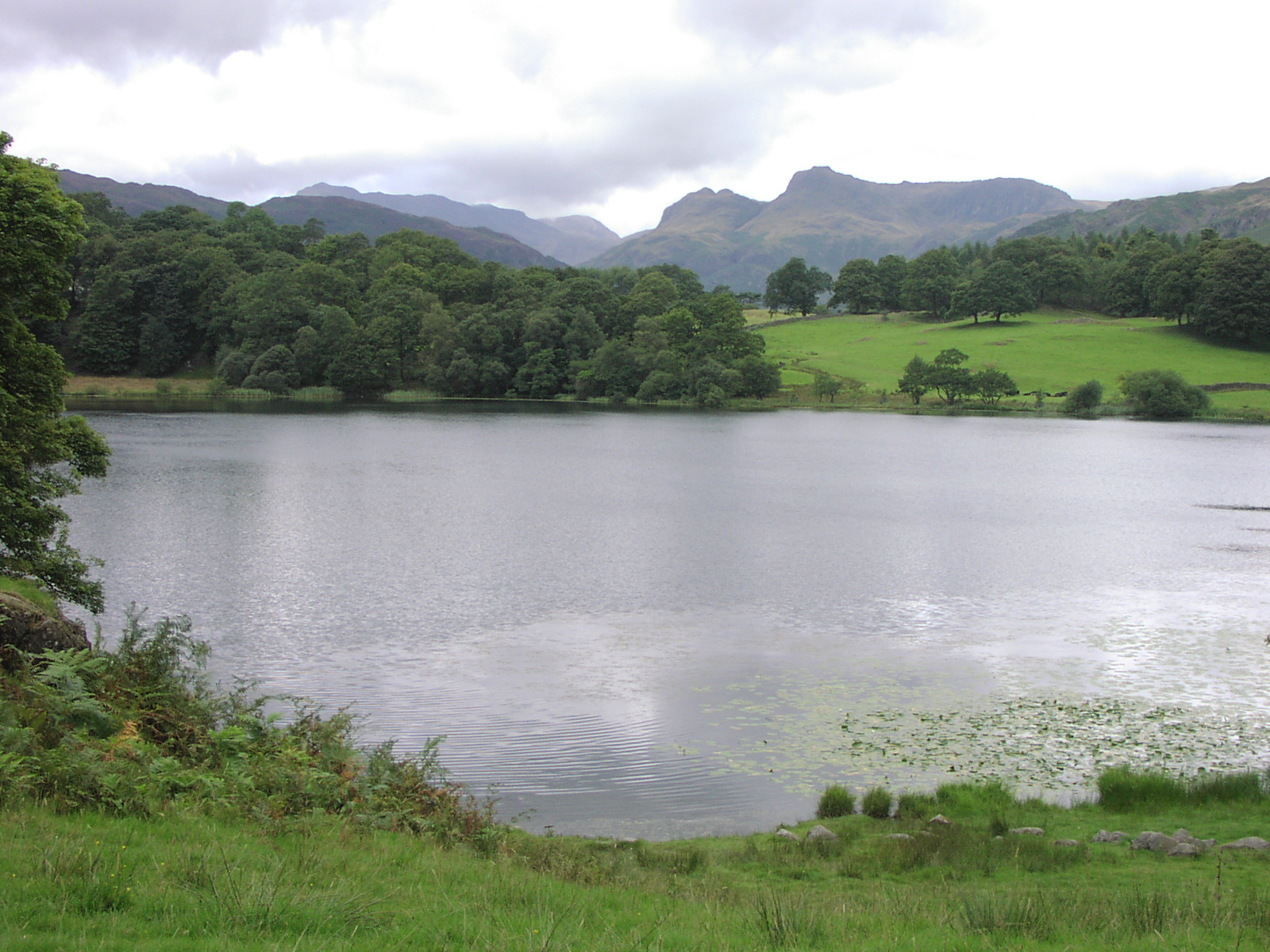
The Langdale Pikes seen in the distance across Loughrigg Tarn
