= Janet Harden =

Scottish diarist

Janet "Jessy" Harden, n. Allan (25 February 1776 to c.1837) was a Scottish diarist who wrote 32 small volumes, considered exclusive documentations of the Edinburgh New Town society. Her diaries cover the period from 1804 to 1811. Her writing described the daily life of her family's affairs to update her sister, Agnes Ranken, who was living in India with her husband.

== Biography ==
Harden was born in Edinburgh, Scotland, on 25 February 1776. Her father, Robert Allan, was a banker, and the owner of the newspaper Caledonian Mercury. Her mother was Margaret Learmonth.

Harden and her husband John lived for some time at Brathay Hall near Ambleside in Cumbria, England, renting it from Henry Law who had inherited it in 1802 on the death of his father, George Law, its builder. Their guests there included Wordsworth, Coleridge and Constable, and the lounge bar of the hall, now an educational and holiday centre, is named "The Harden Bar" in their memory. The British Museum has an 1806 drawing by John Harden described as "Portrait group of five figures, including John Constable making a drawing of Jessy Harden; five figures seated around table at Brathay Hall".

== Diaries and letters ==
Harden diaries and letters are held in the Archives and Manuscripts Collections of the National Library of Scotland.
