= Skelwith Bridge =

Village in Cumbria, England

Coordinates: 54.421°N 3.011°W

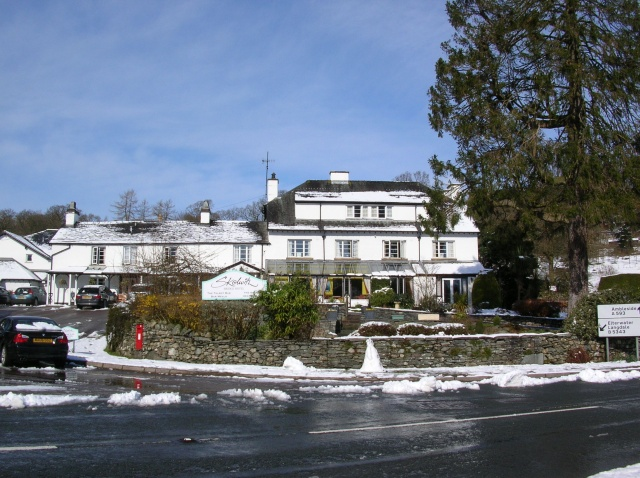
- Skelwith Bridge Hotel

- Location in South Lakeland Location within Cumbria
- Population: 155 (2011
- OS grid reference: NY344033
- Civil parish: Skelwith
- Unitary authority: Westmorland and Furness
- Ceremonial county: Cumbria
- Region: North West
- Country: England
- Sovereign state: United Kingdom
- Post town: AMBLESIDE
- Postcode district: LA22
- Dialling code: 015394
- Police: Cumbria
- Fire: Cumbria
- Ambulance: North West
- UK Parliament: Westmorland and Lonsdale

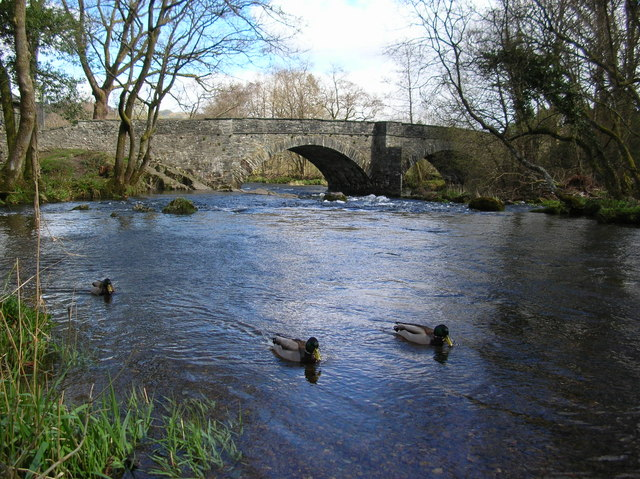
The bridge over the River Brathay

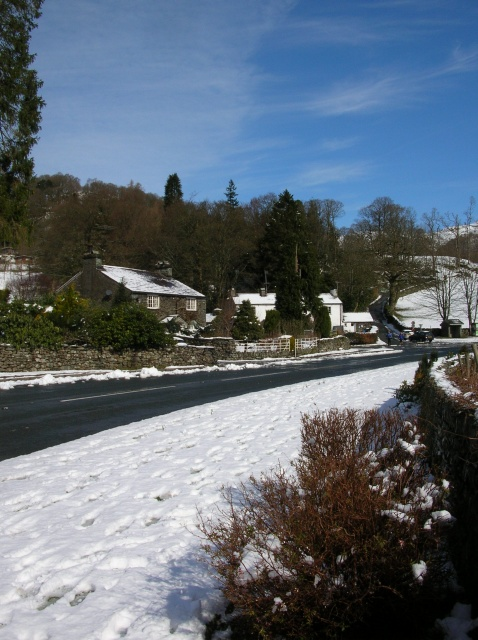
Houses in the village

Skelwith Bridge is a small village in the southern area of the Lake District in Cumbria, England. Historically, Skelwith Bridge is part of Westmorland, lying on the ancient boundary with Lancashire. The civil parish is called Skelwith. Its population at the 2011 census was 155. It is located around 3 miles south of Grasmere and is nearby the waterfalls of Skelwith Force and Colwith Force. The nearest lakes to the village are Elter Water to the north-west and Loughrigg Tarn to the north.

== See also ==
- Listed buildings in Skelwith
