= Halleypike Lough =

Lake in Northumberland, England

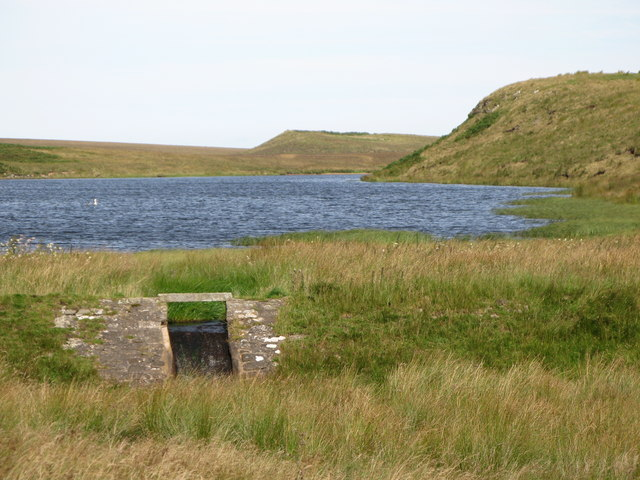

- Location within Northumberland
- Location: Northumberland
- Group: Roman Wall Loughs
- Coordinates: 55.0414°N 2.2970°W
- Basin countries: England

Halleypike Lough is an inland lake on Haughton Common at the southern edge of Northumberland National Park, northeast of Bardon Mill, and 1 mile (1.6 km) north of the B6318 Military Road in Northumberland, northern England. The lake is of Victorian origin and is fished.

== Protected species ==
The White-clawed crayfish Austropotamobius pallipes is present in the Lough. The species is in decline in Europe, Great Britain, and in northeast England, and is the only crayfish native to the British Isles. It is likely that crayfish have never been widespread in Northumberland National Park as their preferred habitat of calcareous burns, rivers, and lakes is very limited.

== See also ==
- Broomlee Lough
- Crag Lough
- Greenlee Lough
