= Clappersgate =

Village in Cumbria, England

Coordinates: 54.423°N 2.977°W

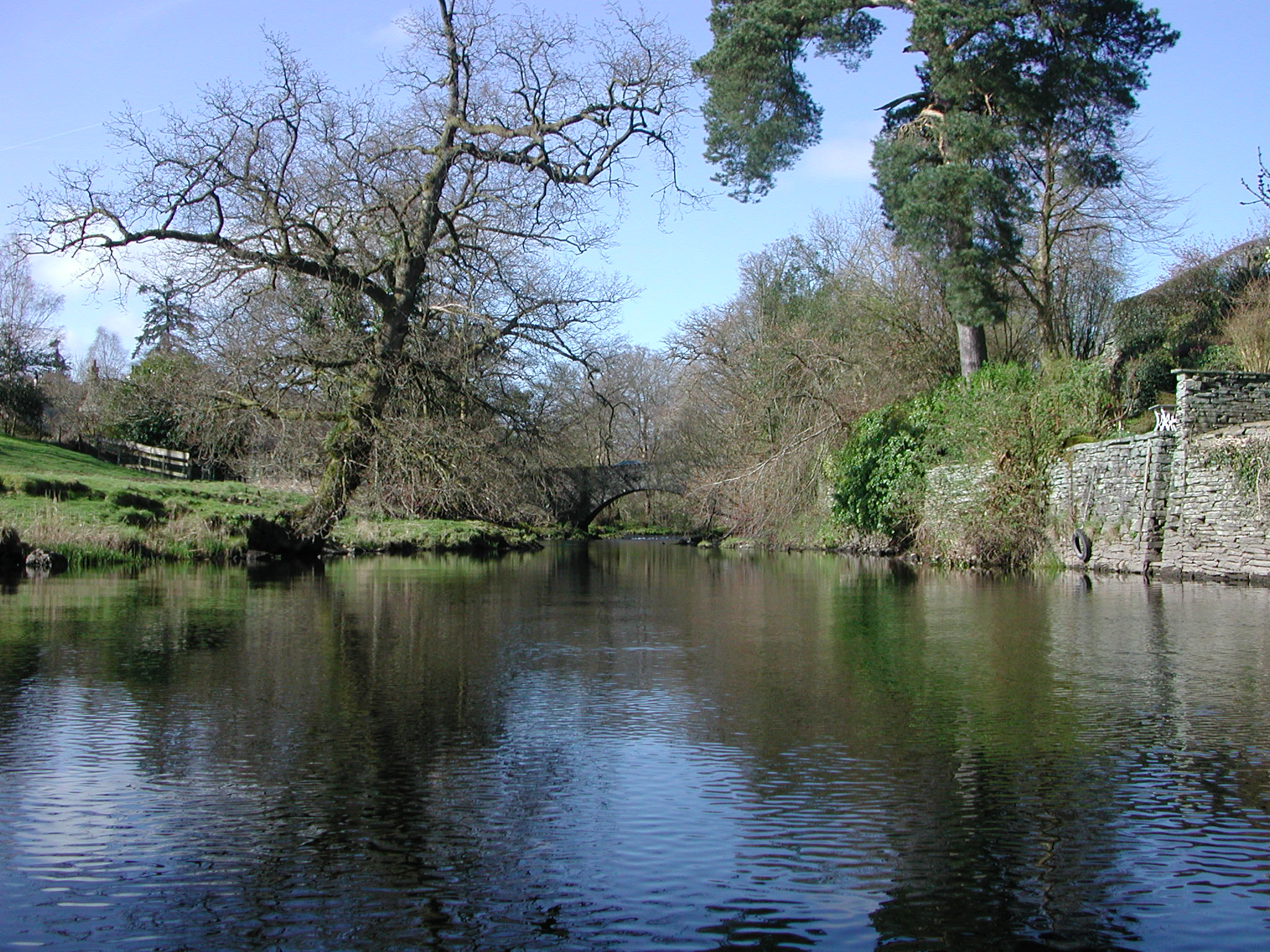
- Clappersgate Bridge on the River Brathay

- Location in South Lakeland Location within Cumbria
- OS grid reference: NY366035
- Civil parish: Lakes
- Unitary authority: Westmorland and Furness
- Ceremonial county: Cumbria
- Region: North West
- Country: England
- Sovereign state: United Kingdom
- Post town: AMBLESIDE
- Postcode district: LA22
- Dialling code: 015394
- Police: Cumbria
- Fire: Cumbria
- Ambulance: North West
- UK Parliament: Westmorland and Lonsdale

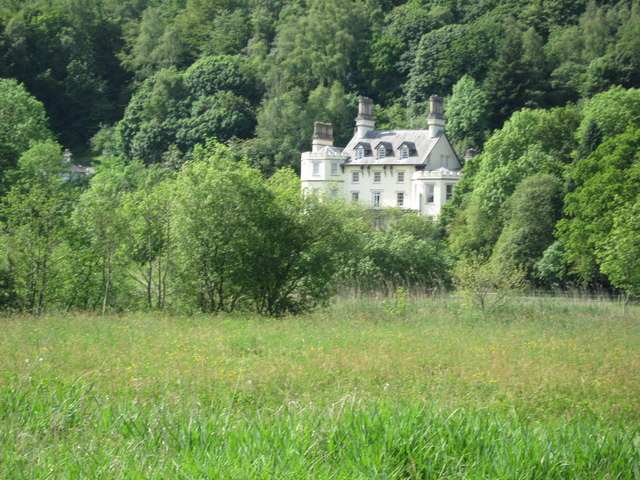
The Croft in Clappersgate

Clappersgate is a village in the Westmorland and Furness Unitary Authority, in the county of Cumbria, England. Clappersgate is located on the B5286 road and on the River Brathay. It is near the town of Ambleside and downstream of Elterwater and Chapel Stile.

The village was once home to a stone skimming club known as the Slate Slingers who utilised the slate washed downstream from quarries, and the large pool located under Clappersgate Bridge.
