= Crag Lough =

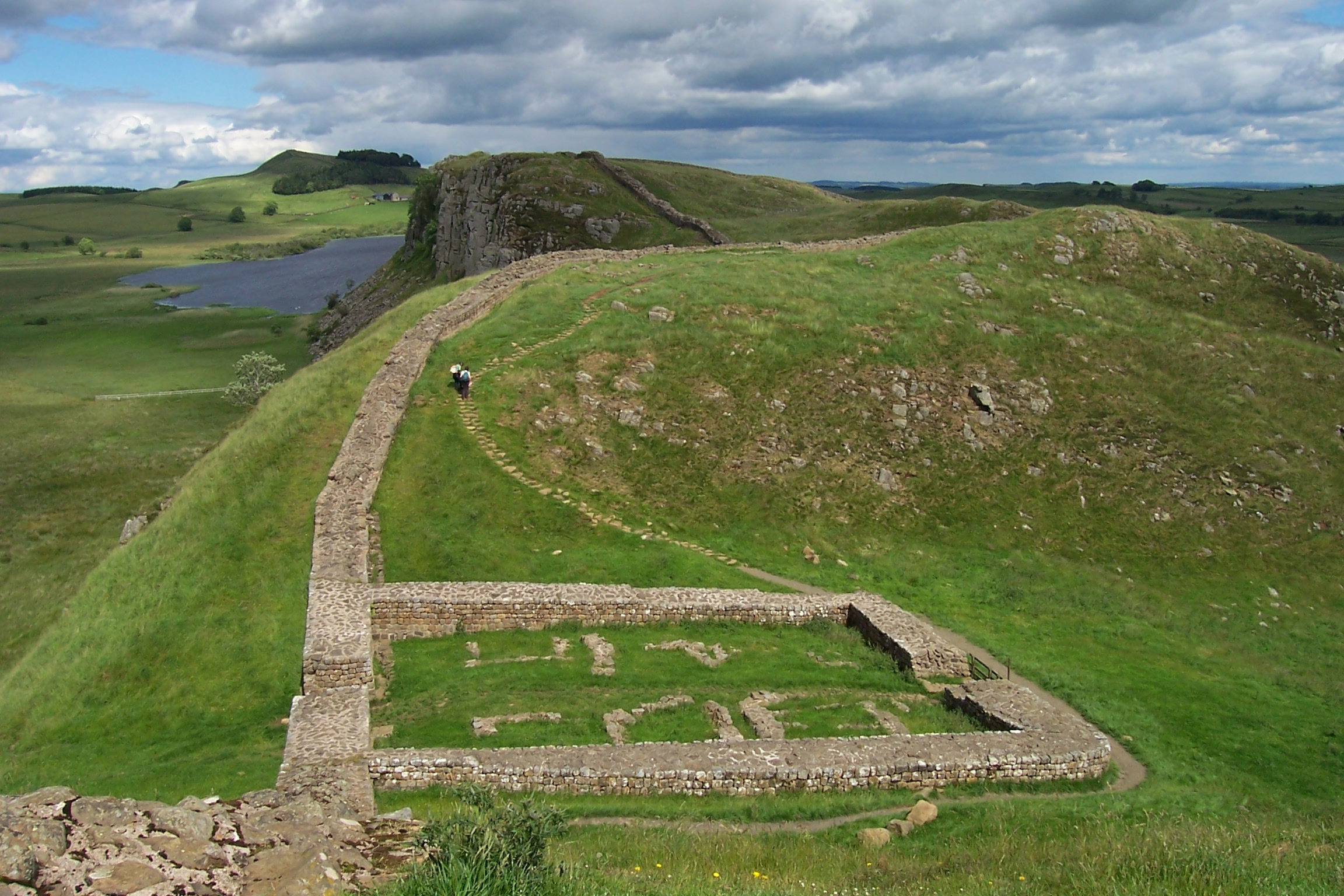
- Milecastle 39 on Hadrian's Wall, with Crag Lough in the distance

- Location within Northumberland
- Location: Northumberland
- Group: Roman Wall Loughs
- Coordinates: 55.006°N 2.366°W
- Type: Natural freshwater lake
- Basin countries: England
- Max. length: 1,970 feet (600 m)
- Max. width: 425 feet (130 m)

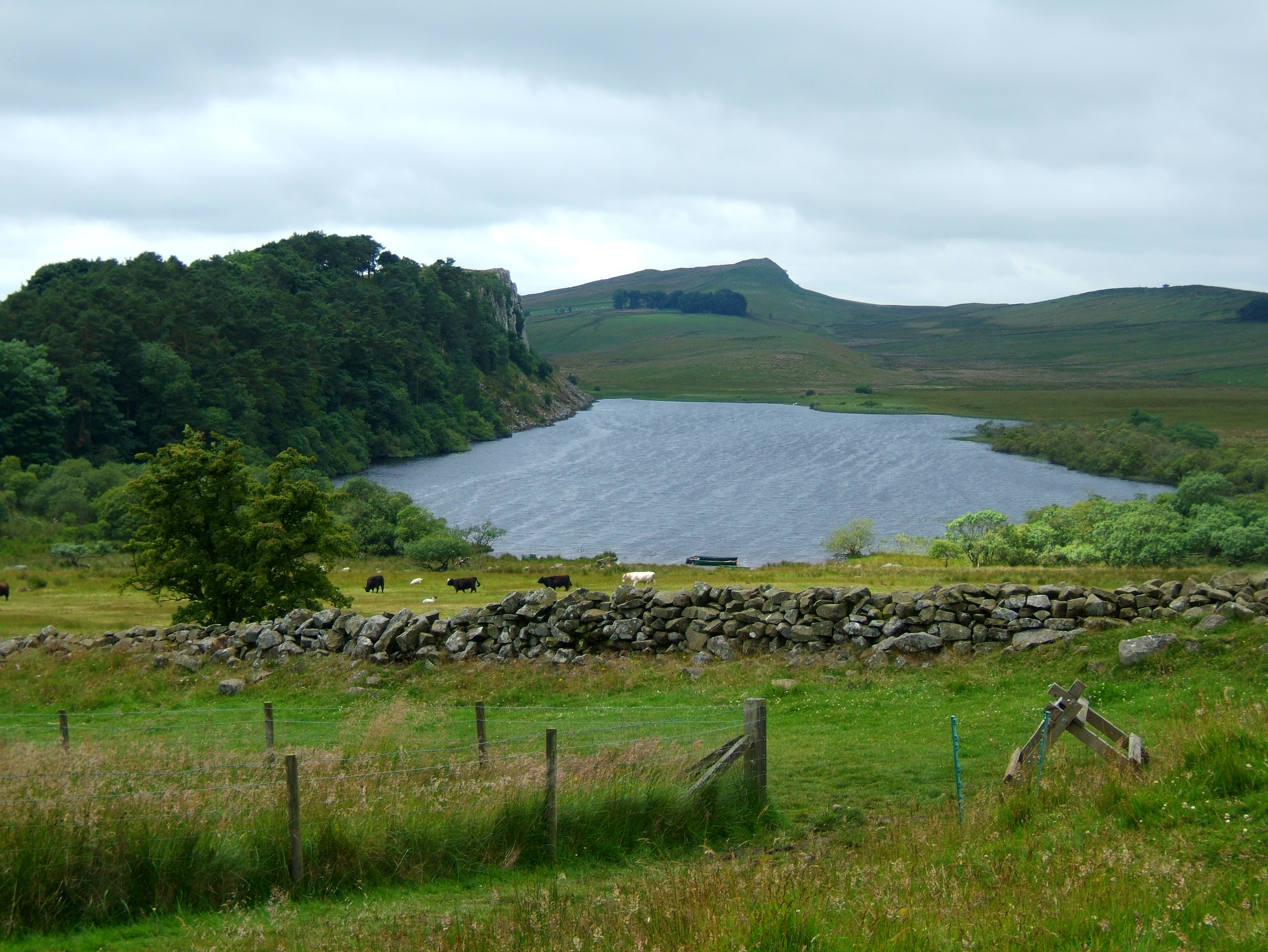

Crag Lough is an inland lake at the southern edge of Northumberland National Park, 2.5 miles (4.0 km) north of Bardon Mill, and 0.5 miles (0.8 km) north of the B6318 Military Road in Northumberland, northern England. At this point Hadrian's Wall is at the top of a line of crags, the Whin Sill, with Crag Lough at the foot of the crags.

== Etymology ==
The etymology of Crag Lough is linked to the Cumbric word luch, meaning 'lake' (cf. Welsh llwch, Scottish Gaelic loch). The 'Crag' element is probably from a word equivalent to Welsh craig, 'cliff'.

== See also ==
- Broomlee Lough
- Greenlee Lough
- Halleypike Lough
