= Broomlee Lough =

Lake in Northumberland, England

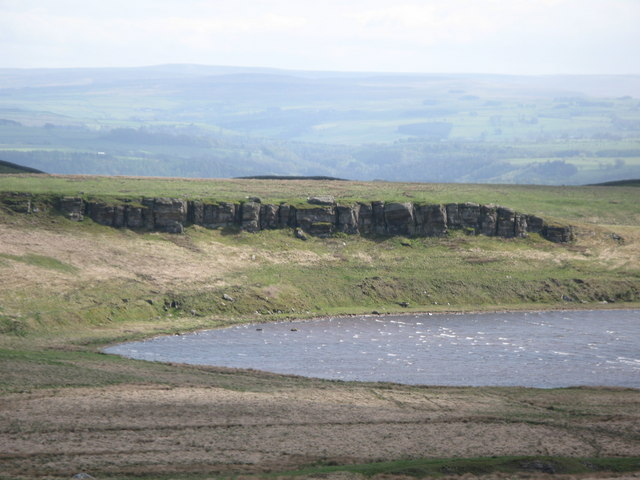
- Dove Crag above Broomlee Lough

- Location within Northumberland
- Location: Northumberland
- Coordinates: 55.022°N 2.329°W
- Basin countries: England

Broomlee Lough is an inland lake in Northumberland, England at the southern edge of Northumberland National Park. The lough lies immediately north of the course of Hadrian's Wall. Old legends portray the lake as a repository of hidden treasure.

== Protected species ==
The White-clawed crayfish Austropotamobius pallipes is present in the Lough. The species is in decline in Europe, Great Britain, and in northeast England, and is the only crayfish native to the British Isles. It is likely that crayfish have never been widespread in Northumberland National Park as their preferred habitat of calcareous burns, rivers, and lakes is very limited.

== See also ==
- Crag Lough
- Greenlee Lough
- Halleypike Lough
