= Brathay Exploration Group =

Brathay Exploration Trust, formerly Brathay Exploration Group, is a not-for-profit charity in the UK which has been providing worldwide youth expeditions since 1947. Based in Ambleside, Cumbria, England, BET aims to run around five expeditions per year, to destinations all over the world. The group is aimed at young people (aged 16–25) from all backgrounds who share an interest in the outdoors and who want to "learn new skills, make new friends, gain new self-confidence and discover new places on expeditions, in the UK, Europe and worldwide". Run predominantly by volunteers, BEG engages professional leaders on a voluntary basis.

== History ==
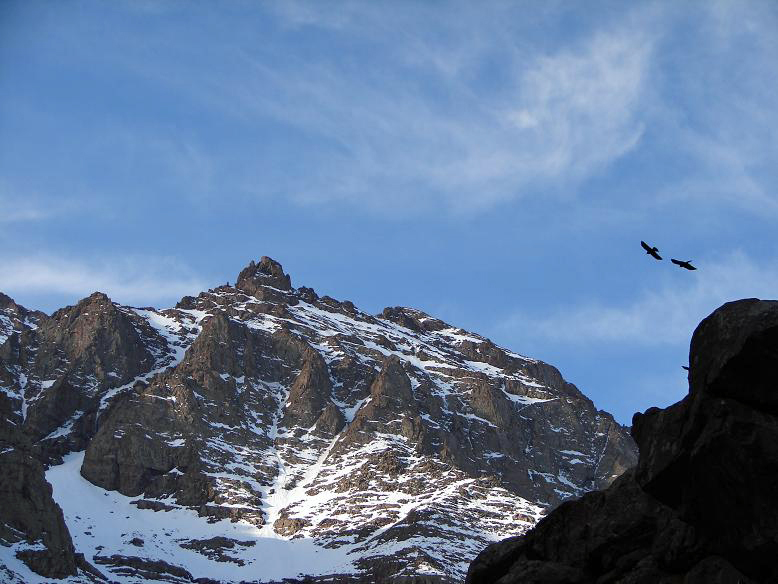
The Summit of Jbel Toubkal in Morocco.

Founded by businessman Michael Scott in 1947, Brathay Exploration has since taken almost 10,000 participants on almost 700 expeditions all over the world. In 1997 the Royal Geographical Society awarded BET a Special Medal "for services to exploration and youth adventurous activities". Brathay Exploration was a founder member of the Young Explorers' Trust and has published a number of scientific and other reports, which are available from the Royal Geographical Society Expedition Advisory Centre.

== Structure ==
Brathay Exploration Trust Ltd. is a Registered Charity (Reg. No. 1061156) run by an elected board of trustees. All of the trustees and members are volunteers, with the exception of the trust's only employee, its part-time administrator. The administrator is responsible for running BET's Office and Headquarters at Shackleton Lodge, both of which are situated beside the River Brathay near Ambleside in Cumbria. Although all of the Expedition Leaders are also volunteers, many of whom have risen through the ranks of members to eventually plan and implement their own trip and are now advised and guided by BET's Expedition Development Officer, a new role created in 2014 to help build and develop a diverse and high-quality itinerary of expeditions.

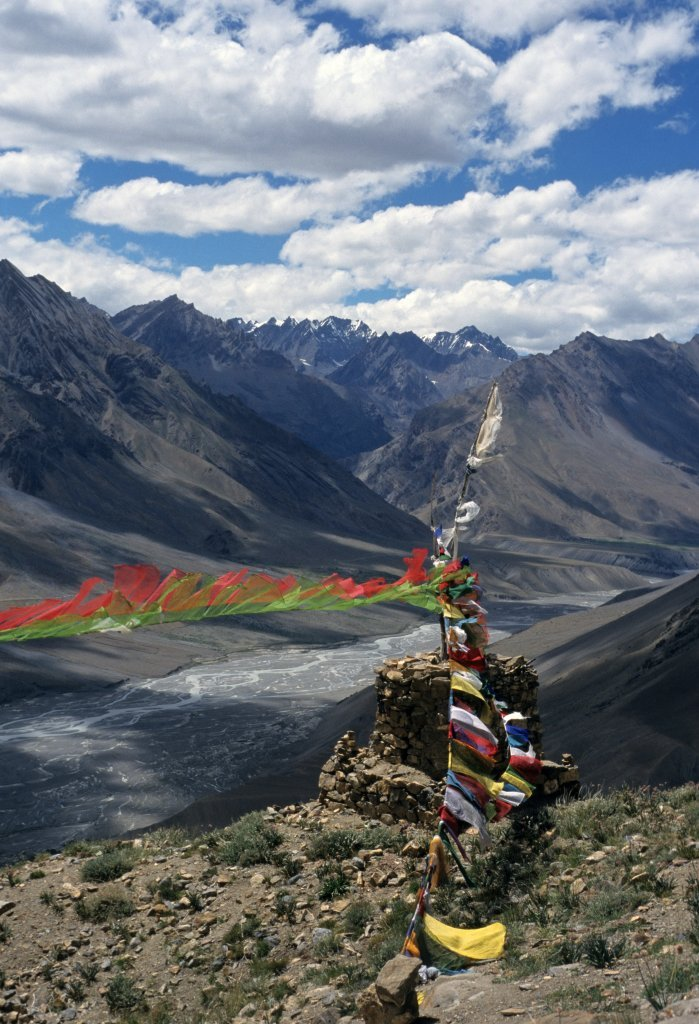
Stupa above Ki Gompa and the Spiti River in India.

== Annual events ==
There are a number of regular events throughout the year:

=== Annual Reunion ===
There is an annual reunion (usually over the first weekend in the October half-term), where members and leaders of expeditions reunite and relive the fun of their expedition. In recent years, this has taken the form of formal presentations, followed by more informal discussions over drinks, followed by a ceilidh. The Annual Raft Race is also now a regular event.

=== Annual Dinner ===
There is also an annual dinner (usually held in January), where members can meet up and discuss past and future trips, as well as catching up on each other's news in yet another excuse for people to socialise!

=== Leaders' Weekend ===
The main Leaders' weekend (usually held in March) is where leaders meet to discuss one another's trips, plan future events, feedback together and receive relevant information and training. It is also where most of the expeditions undergo their external vetting.

=== Members' Weekends ===
Members' weekends occur regularly throughout the year. Accommodation at BET's Headquarters is free for all members, and it is a chance for members to catch up and spend a weekend in the hills.

== Previous Expeditions ==
Past Expeditions
Year	Destination 1	Destination 2	Destination 3	Destination 4	Destination 5	Destination 6	Destination 7	Destination 8	Destination 9	Destination 10	Destination 11
2010	-	-	-	-	-	-	-	-	-	-	-
2009	Norway	Spain	D of E	-	-	-	-	-	-	-	-
2008	India¹	Morocco	Corsica	Foula	D of E	-	-	-	-	-	-
2007	Bulgaria¹	India	Morocco	Mull	Norway	Romania¹	Scotland	D of E	-	-	-
2006	Tanzania	India	Guatemala	Malta/Gozo	Alps	Foula	John Muir Trail	Norway	D of E	Lake District¹	-
2005	Alps (Tour Du Mont Blanc)	China	Via Feratta	Tanzania	Guernsey*	Morocco	South Africa	Mull	D of E	Lake District¹	-
2004	Corsica	India	Alaska	Bolivia	Belize	Alps	Foula	D of E	Lake District	-	-
2003	Norway	Lake District	-	-	-	-	-	-	-	-	-
2002	Belize¹	Corsica	Ghana¹	India²	Lake District	-	-	-	-	-	-
2001	Oman	Ghana	India	South Africa	Malaysia	Canada	Romania	Corsica	Greece	Mull	Lake District
2000	India	Svalbard	Mongolia	Belize	Alaska	Morocco	Norway	Alps	Scotland	Mull	Foula

¹ Expedition cancelled ² Due to problems in Kashmir, this expedition was altered to go to Morocco
