= River Brathay =

River in Cumbria, England

Coordinates: 54.41548°N 3.11560°W

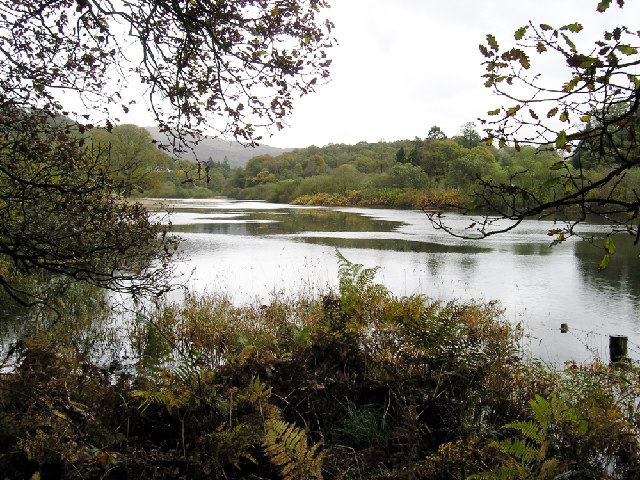
The river near Clappersgate after heavy rain

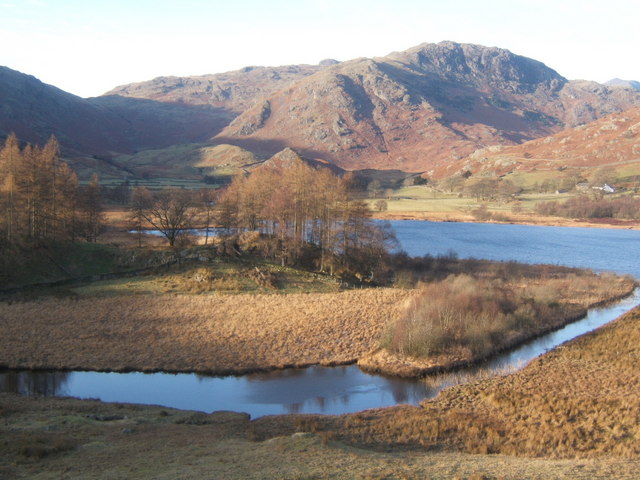
The river exiting Little Langdale Tarn

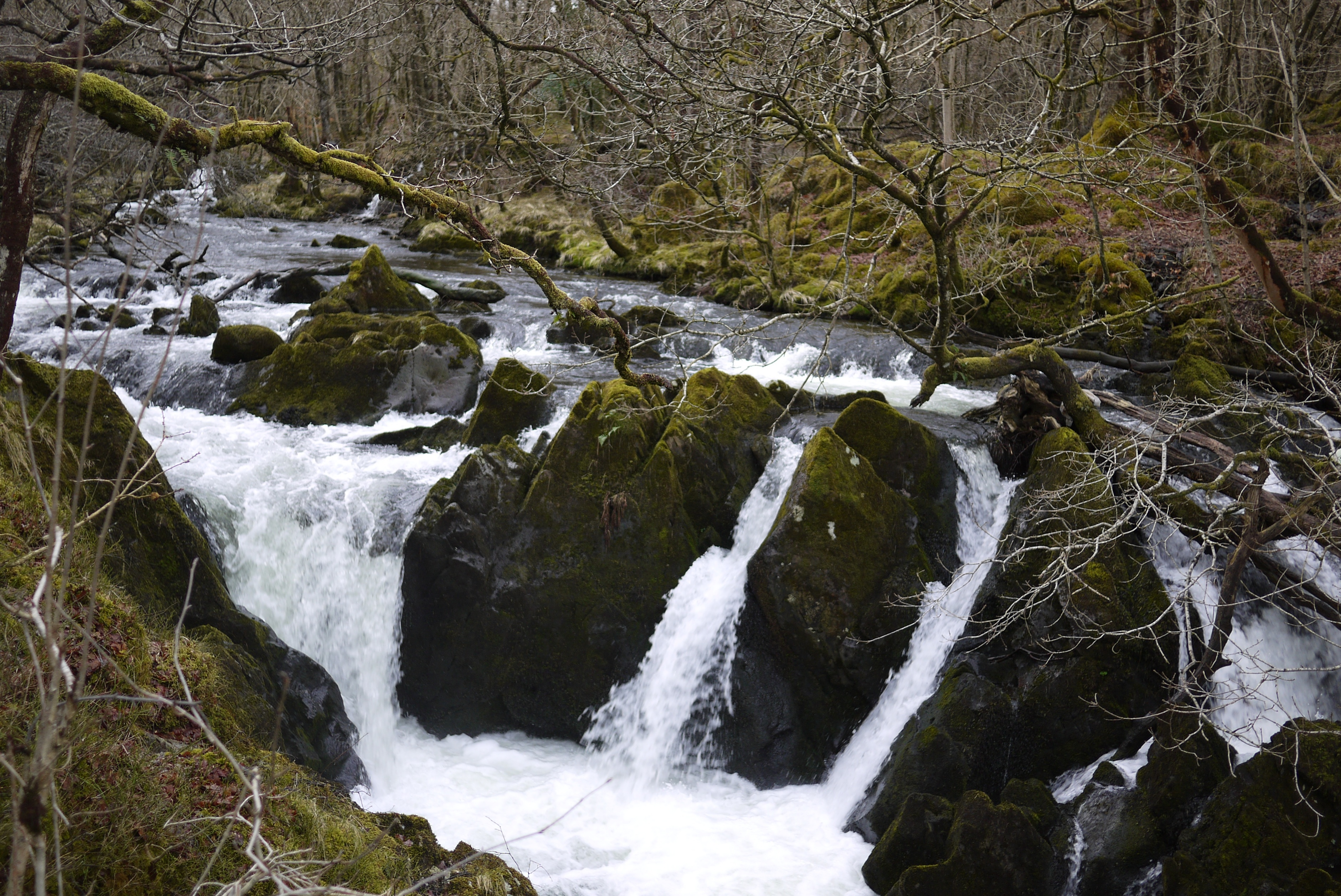
Colwith Force

The Brathay is a river of north-west England. Its name comes from Old Norse and means broad river. It rises at a point 1289 feet (393 m) above sea level near the Three Shire Stone at the highest point of Wrynose Pass (grid reference NY277028) in the Lake District. Its catchment area includes the northern flanks of Wetherlam, Great Carrs and others of the Furness Fells, as well as a substantial area of the Langdale Fells. It flows through Elter Water, marking the division between its upper and lower catchments.

== Upper Brathay catchment ==
The small stream at the top of Wrynose quickly gathers pace as it descends some 930 feet (283 m) in a distance of about two miles (3.2 km), running roughly parallel to, and south of, the Wrynose Pass road. Before flowing into Little Langdale Tarn it subsumes Bleamoss Beck, the outflow from Blea Tarn. Little Langdale Tarn is also replenished by the Greenburn Beck. The Brathay drains Little Langdale Tarn at its eastern side. It continues in an easterly direction, over Colwith Force where it falls 40 feet (12 m), before turning north and flowing into the tarn of Elter Water at an elevation of 187 feet (57 m) above sea level. Elter Water is also replenished by the Great Langdale Beck.

== Lower Brathay catchment ==
The Brathay drains Elter Water and flows for about half a mile (0.8 km) in a south-easterly direction to Skelwith Force where it descends 15 feet (4.6 m). Passing under the A593 road at Skelwith Bridge, and continues in an easterly direction, to the hamlet of Clappersgate. After another quarter of a mile (400 m) it joins the River Rothay close to Croft Lodge south-west of Ambleside before flowing into the northern end of Windermere.

The stretches of the Brathay around Clappersgate and Skelwith Force are popular with canoeists.

== History ==
For its entire length the River Brathay forms part of the boundary between the historic counties of Lancashire and Westmorland. Since local government re-organisation in 1974 the Brathay has been within the administrative county of Cumbria.

The river also gives its name to the Brathay estate where the Brathay Exploration Group is based, just south of its confluence with the River Rothay on the edge of Windermere, and is home to the Brathay Trust youth-development charity.

== See also ==
- Cunsey Beck
- River Leven
- Trout Beck
