= A593 road =

Road in Cumbria, England

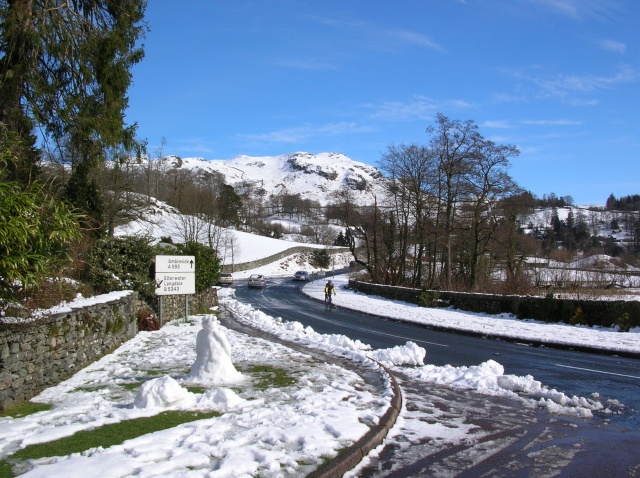
The A593 near Skelwith Bridge in March 2008

The A593 is a road in Cumbria, England, running north east from the A595 road at Broughton-in-Furness through Torver, Coniston and Skelwith Bridge to Ambleside at the north end of Windermere. It is 17 miles (27 km) long and has been described as "scenic".
