= Olive Clarke =

English farmer and public figure (1922–2023)

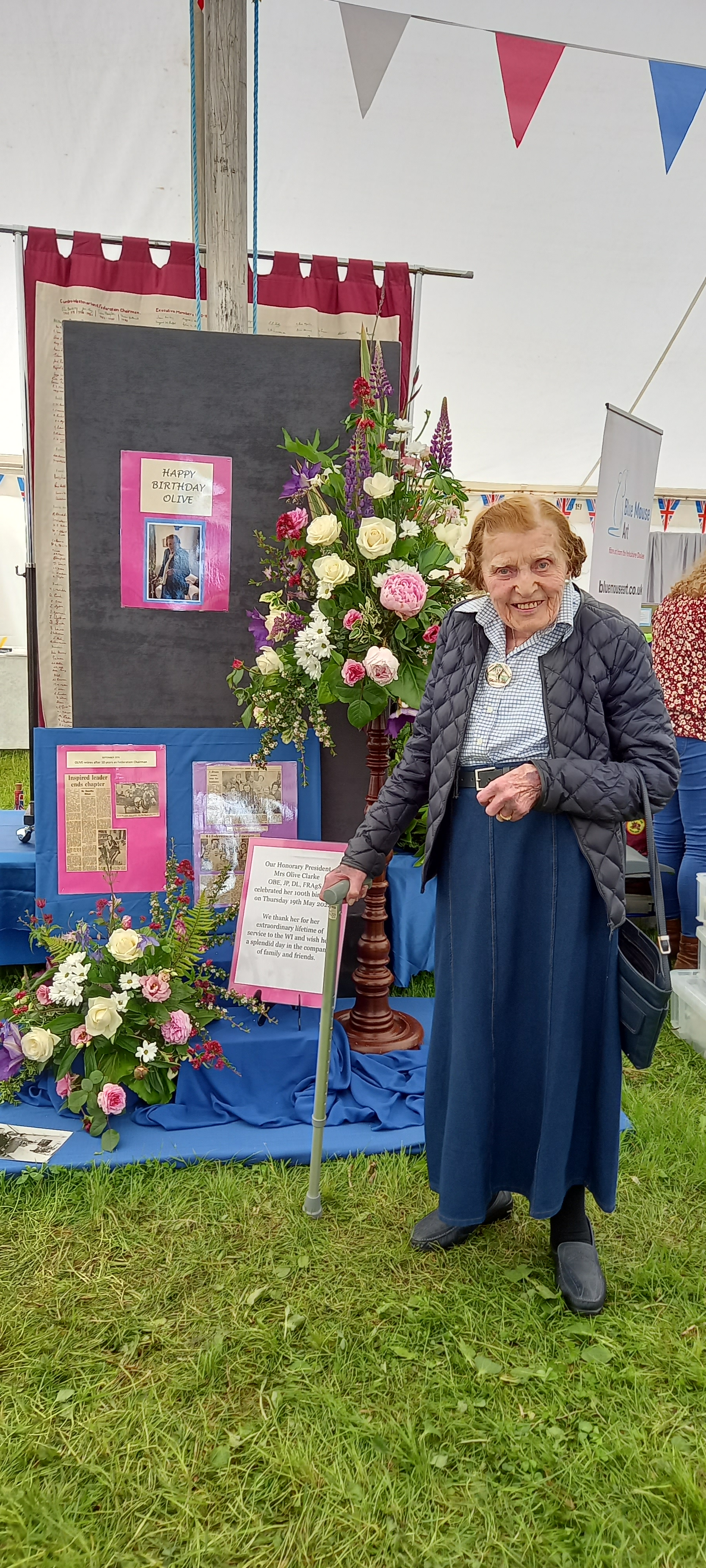
Clarke in 2022 in the WI marquee at the Westmorland County Show, beside a display celebrating her 100th birthday

Olive Clarke OBE DL (née Teasdale, 19 May 1922 – 18 December 2023) was an English farmer and public figure in Cumbria.

== Early life and education ==
Clarke was born Olive Teasdale, on 19 May 1922, an only child in a farming family. Her parents were George Teasdale and his wife Sarah, née Fawcett. She gained a scholarship to Kendal High School for Girls, and there was encouraged by the headmistress, a Dr Frood, to take up public speaking. Clarke said that Dr Frood "believed women should assert themselves and achieve a place in society - and they would need to be articulate, so she included public speaking in the school curriculum". She left school aged 16.

== Public life ==
=== Young Farmers' Club ===
Clarke joined the Hutton Young Farmers' Club (YFC) in 1938 when she left school. She soon entered a public speaking competition and did well, and later said that the greatest achievement of the Young Farmers' Club movement was to have produced "an articulate agricultural community". She remained involved with the YFC all her life, was the first woman to be chair of the Federation of Young Farmers' Clubs and in 2013 was appointed its honorary life vice-president.

=== Settle and Carlisle Railway ===
Clarke was a member, and later chairman, of the North West England Transport Consultative Committee, and chaired the enquiry into the future of the Settle and Carlisle Railway.

=== CLA ===
Clarke joined the Country Land and Business Association (CLA, formerly the Country Landowners' Association) in the 1970s, becoming the first woman to be the Westmorland and Furness branch president in the 1980s, and serving on the branch committee until October 2019 (retiring at the age of 97). From 1984 to 1988 she was a member of the CLA Council, and she served two five-year terms on the national CLA legal and parliamentary sub committee, based in London. At the 2019 AGM of the Cumbria branch, the national CLA director general Sara Hendry praised Clarke for "her long and distinguished track record in Cumbria and beyond, especially for breaking new ground for women in the rural sector".

=== Women's Institute ===
Clarke attended the inaugural meeting of the Old Hutton Women's Institute (WI) as a small baby because her mother, grandmother and aunt all wished to be present and had nowhere to leave her. She later joined that WI and at 18 became its secretary. At 31 she became president of Preston Patrick WI, and at 46 became chairman of the Westmorland County Federation (later "Cumbria-Westmorland"), and served on several national WI sub-committees. She remained active in WI, and spoke as guest of honour at a large tea-party held to celebrate her 100th birthday in 2022. Clarke was appointed honorary president of the Cumbria-Westmorland Federation of Women's Institutes in 2010, the first time this office had been held since 1948.

=== Other public roles ===
Clarke was a JP and served as a magistrate for over 30 years, being chair of the Cumbria Magistrates Association from 1981 to 1988. In 1980, she became a general commissioner of income tax, and in 1987 was appointed to the Cumbria Advisory Committee for Appointment of General Commissioners. She also served as a county councillor, parish councillor, patron of Cumbria in Bloom, president of Witherslack Horse Show, treasurer of Preston Patrick Memorial Hall (for 50 years), and was a life member of the Westmorland County Agricultural Society, becoming its first female president in 1986. She served as a member of the deanery synod of Carlisle Cathedral and as a trustee of its development trust.

She had a life-long interest in public speaking, tutoring young speakers and adjudicating competitions. A speech she gave, at the age of 100, to the Worshipful Company of Farmers was described as "a tour de force, the best speech ever heard from anyone at our livery lunches".

== Recognition ==
In 1978, Clarke received the Queen Elizabeth II Silver Jubilee Medal. She was appointed MBE in the 1979 New Year Honours, the citation being: "Member, North West Transport Users' Consultative Committee. For public service in Cumbria", and OBE in the 1994 New Year Honours "For services to the public and to the community in Cumbria."

In 1993 she was appointed a Deputy lieutenant of Cumbria.

In 2012 she was elected a Fellow of the Royal Agricultural Society of England in recognition of her "outstanding personal achievements and continuing record of service to agriculture and rural life".

In 2022, Clarke was given a Lifetime Achievement Award at the Cumbria Farming Awards "in recognition of her life-long commitment to rural issues across Cumbria". In October 2023, at the British Farming Awards, Clarke was awarded a Special Recognition Lifetime Achievement, and was described as "Farming's original female trailblazer".

Clarke was a liveryman of the Worshipful Company of Farmers and a Freeman of the City of London.

== Personal life ==
Olive married Arthur Clarke in 1947, and they remained married until his death in 1995. They farmed Kaker Mill Farm at Preston Patrick. They had two daughters and at her death in 2023 Clarke had four grandchildren and eight great-grandchildren. She lived her whole life on two farms, latterly Kaker Mill Farm at Preston Patrick.

Olive Clarke died at her home on 18 December 2023, at the age of 101. Her funeral took place at St Patrick's Church, Preston Patrick on 4 January 2024.
