= Peasey Beck =

Stream in Cumbria, England

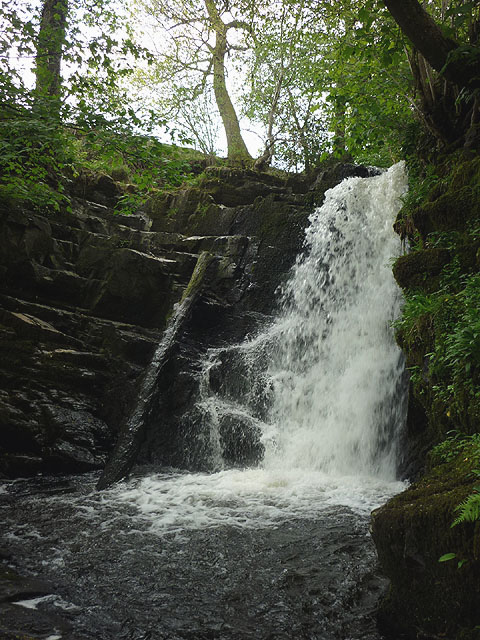
- Waterfall on the Peasey Beck near Old Hutton

- Location of the mouth within Cumbria

Location
- Country: England
- County: Cumbria

Physical characteristics
- Mouth
  - location: River Bela at Milnthorpe
  - coordinates: 54.2245°N 2.7407°W
- Length: 19.6 km (12.2 mi)

Peasey Beck is a 19.6-kilometre-long (12.2 mi) beck flowing through Cumbria, England. It rises on Lambrigg Fell where it is known as the Sparishaw Beck, flows through Killington Reservoir and converges with Stainton Beck to form the River Bela at Milnthorpe. Prior to 1913, it was known as the River Beela throughout its length.

== Course ==
The source of the beck is on Lambrigg Fell, close to the 1,015-foot (310 m) contour (grid reference SD589940) between Kendal and Sedbergh, where it is known as the Sparishaw Beck. It heads towards the south, and is crossed by the A684 road, the M6 motorway and Fairthorns Road to reach Killington Reservoir.

Two dams impound the water of Killington Reservoir, and the main outflow for Peasey Beck runs through the longer of the two. The beck is crossed by Reservoir Road, a minor road that follows the southern shore of the reservoir, and then by another unnamed road at Low Bendrigg. Near Crooks Plantation, it turns to the east before sweeping round in a large loop to head westwards. It is joined by Gillsmere Sike on its left bank, which flows northwards, passing close to a small lake called Tarneybank Tarn, the outflow from which supplements that of Gillsmere Sike.

Peasey Beck is crossed by another minor road as it approaches the hamlet of Little Brunthwaite, after which it is crossed by the M6 motorway. The next crossing is the B6254 at Bridge End, and there are waterfalls as it passes to the south of Old Hutton. A minor road from Old Hutton crosses at Beckside, and then Popplemire Lane is carried over the waterway by Blaystone Bridge. Shortly afterwards, the beck turns to the south. Gatebeck Bridge carries Gatebeck Lane over the river at Gatebeck, and there is a weir to the south of the bridge.

Beyond the bridge on the eastern bank of the river are the remains of Low Gatebeck gunpowder works. Although the northern part of the site has been demolished and levelled, much of the southern part of the site remains, and is one of the better preserved gunpowder works dating from the 19th and early 20th centuries in northern England. Many of the buildings still stand, as well as parts of the water management system. The weir by Gatebeck Bridge provided water power for some of the production processes, and fed waterwheels and turbines.

The beck passes to the east of Endmoor, where there is another weir, and is crossed by a minor road carried by Challon Hall Bridge, near to Challon Hall. At Kaker Mill or Preston Patrick, there is another weir, and the beck turns to the south-west. The beck falls over a weir where the feeder for the Lancaster Canal diverges, before it passes through a sluice, and runs parallel to the river for most of the way to the canal. Peasey Bridge carries the A65 road over the river, and immediately beyond it, Peasey Beck passes under the Lancaster Canal through an aqueduct. The aqueduct dates from around 1818, and consists of two shallow arches, built at an angle to the line of the canal, with curved retaining walls at either side. It is about 30 feet (9.1 m) wide, and is a grade II listed structure. The canal feeder continues a little further south around the back of Crooklands coach garage, before passing under the A65 road and through the grounds of Mill Outstation, a depot for National Highways, to enter the canal.

Beyond the canal there are weirs associated with a water mill at Millness and another at Milton. The mill at Millness was a corn mill, and was fed by a long lade which began at a weir at Crooklands. At Milton, the mill is attached to the rear of the former miller's house, built in the early 18th century, with an extension constructed in 1863 for Jacob Wakefield, whose initials appear on the end gable. The water wheel and internal machinery remain in situ. The beck passes under the A590 road and Wath Sutton Bridge at Wath Sutton. It is joined by Farleton Beck on its left bank, and the combined flow join that of Stainton Beck to the east of Ackenthwaite and Milnthorpe, to become the River Bela, which flows into the estuary of the River Kent.

== Killington Reservoir ==
Killington Reservoir or Killington Lake was built to supply water to the Lancaster Canal. The proprietors for the Lancaster Canal were empowered by an Act of Parliament obtained in 1807 to deviate from their original route, and to extract water from Farleton Beck, Stainton Beck and Crooklands Beck (later called Peasey Beck), rather than the River Mint. They bought 86 acres (35 ha) of land in 1810, in order to build the reservoir, but over-stretched themselves, and construction had to wait until they had raised more money. William Crossley was the Canal company's engineer from 10 May 1817, while James Briggs was the superintendent. Crossley oversaw the construction of the reservoir. The contract was initially awarded to Millington, Bainbridge & Kelly, but there was a problem with their tender, and William Seed carried out the work. Two dams were required to impound the water, both of which had clay cores. The larger one (SD590907) crossed the valley of the Peasey Beck, and was 830 feet (253 m) long and 52 feet (15.8 m) high. The second dam further to the west (SD585904) was 360 feet (110 m) long and just 10 feet (3 m) high. The reservoir was eventually completed in 1819. It now covers an area of 140 acres (57 ha), as its banks have been raised twice. A wave wall was built along the top of the dams in the late 1970s, to prevent erosion of the face of the dam in high winds. When full the reservoir holds 3,236 Ml of water, and supplies around 22.7 Ml per day to the Lancaster Canal.

Land for the reservoir consisted of parts of the parishes of New Hutton, to the west, Old Hutton and Holmescales to the south-west, and Killington to the south-east. Landowners who had grazing rights on the land were compensated for their loss, and the rights of turbary were also lost, as the main peat workings for the villages were flooded. The New Hutton, Old Hutton, Killington, Mansergh and Lupton Enclosure Award Act was obtained in 1841, allowing further common land to be divided into fields which were given to those with grazing rights. The canal company obtained an additional 26 acres (11 ha) at this time, and the original three parishes received payment. Old Hutton received £321 9s 3d (£321.46) as part of the deal, which they used to set up a Mole Fund, and to employ Thomas Woodhouse, a mole catcher resident in Preston Patrick, from December 1853.

Landowners in the three parishes maintained that although they had sold the land, that did not include the fishing rights, and appointed a bailiff to enforce this in 1840. However, the canal company claimed they owned the fishing rights in 1880, and a long-running dispute followed, which was finally settled in November 1912, when the High Court ruled that the canal company did not inherit the fishing rights. The rights are managed by the Killington Reservoir Fishery Charity, which has three trustees, one appointed by each of the parishes. They have been rented by the Kent Angling Association for many years, and the £750 income is split between the Old Hutton Mole Fund, the New Hutton Institute and Killington Village Hall. Residents of the parishes can obtain fishing licences at reduced fees. By 1976, Old Hutton's income from the fishing rights was no longer adequate to employ a full-time mole catcher, and the trust deed governing the Mole Fund was amended, with funds now being used for the benefit of residents in Old Hutton and Homescales.

The M6 motorway passes immediately to the west of the reservoir, and Killington Lake Services, which is only accessible to southbound drivers, is situated on the bank. When it was being planned, the Ministry of Transport were keen that service areas in Cumbria should be notable for their scenery, and the views over the reservoir were the main factor for the services only catering for southbound travellers. They were built in 1972, soon after the motorway opened, and were officially opened on 17 May 1972. The buildings were sited as far away from the motorway as possible, but were quite small, initially having parking for 64 cars and 13 heavy goods vehicles. The building was replaced in 1985, using a standard design, but with larger windows to take advantage of the views across the reservoir. The service area gained a hotel in 1994 and a tourist information centre in 1997. Planning permission to expand the amenity building was granted in 2019.

The reservoir contains populations of both game fish and coarse fish, and fishing rights are rented by the Kent (Westmorland) Angling Association. For game fishing, the association stocks the reservoir with brown trout between March and June each year, and the game fishing season runs from 15 March until 30 September. Coarse fishing is available all year round, and the reservoir contains roach, pike, perch and bream. Season tickets and day tickets are available for those who are not members of the association, and fishing is only allowed from the banks of the reservoir, with no fishing from boats.

Water sports also take place on the reservoir. The Killington Sailing Association has a clubhouse and floating jetty on the east side of the lake, next to the main dam, and has facilities for dinghy sailing, canoeing, paddle-boarding and wind-surfing. They are affiliated to the Royal Yachting Association and offer training to members, youth groups and people with disadvantages.

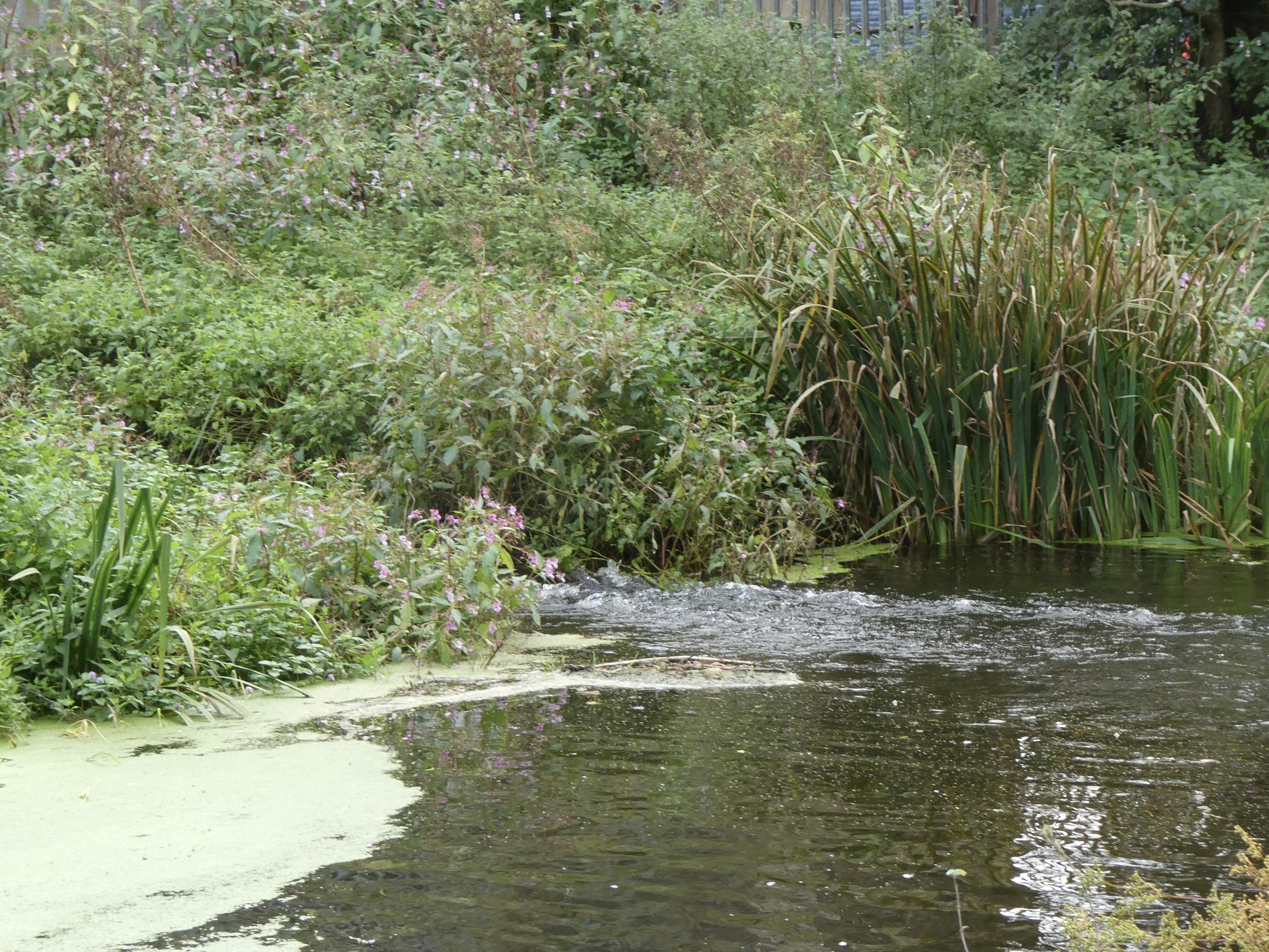
Water diverted from Peasey Beck entering Lancaster Canal at Crooklands

Below the dam, the water is not carried to the canal in an aqueduct; the reservoir merely controls the flow in the beck. A small dam about 6 miles (9.7 km) downstream near Crooklands diverts water into the canal.

=== Hydro-electric power ===
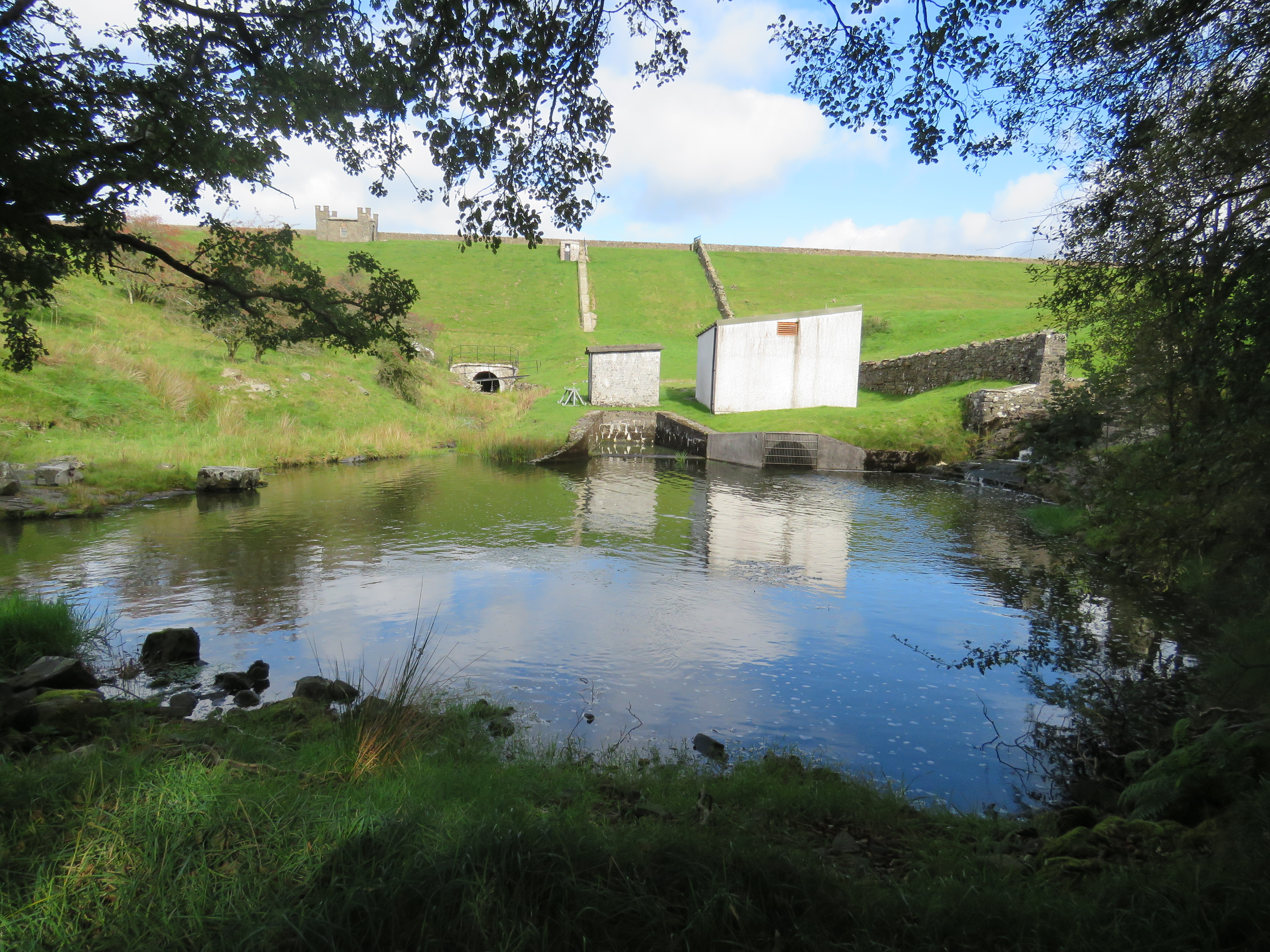
The outfow from the Reservoir. The hydro-electric plant is in the white building on the right.

Since 2017, the outflow from the reservoir has been used to generate hydro-electric power. Killington was chosen as a potential site for a community hydro-electric project because of its size, as it impounds some 3.2 billion litres of water, rainfall data for over 30 years was available, and there was already an outflow pipe running through the dam 49 feet (15 m) below the surface level of the reservoir. The scheme was initiated by Cumbria Action for Sustainability, who funded the feasibility studies, with engineering design carried out by Ellergreen Hydro of nearby Burneside. A lease for 40 years was negotiated with the Canal and River Trust, and planning permission was obtained in September 2013, to which there were no objections, in part due to the level of community involvement.

Divers installed a fish pass to prevent bottom feeding fish from entering the outflow pipe during 2014, and in 2015 a community benefit society called Community Energy Cumbria was formed. Around 100 people subscribed to the share issue launched in July 2015, most from the local community. Construction of the scheme began in 2016, with 86 per cent of the materials and labour being procured locally. The total cost of the project was £240,000, including the design work. A crossflow turbine was installed into the existing drawdown pipe, designed to produce 30 kW from a flow of 300 litres per second.

The scheme was switched on in January 2017, and formally opened by Tim Farron MP. During its first year of operation it generated income of £33,500. Of this, £21,500 was available to fund interest payments and repayment of capital to the shareholders, as well as for community benefits, which are expected to be around £50,000 over the first 20 years.

== Mills ==
Despite its relatively small size, the waters of Peasey Beck have powered at least eight watermills. Furthest upstream was Hutton mill (SD565884), just above Bridge End Bridge. A mill race left the river on its left bank and fed a mill much closer to the bridge. In the late 1600s, it was a corn mill and some of the first machinery for cleaning grain to be used in the region was described by Thomas Machell, the rector of Kirkby Thore, who collected a huge amount of data about Cumbria until his death in 1698. At that time, the mill was used for grinding the barrels of guns as well as grinding, threshing and winnowing corn. It had become a bobbin mill and woollen worsted mill by the mid-19th century, and was processing Italian flax in 1885. At Beckside Bridge (SD558881), a weir and mill race was constructed for a corn mill which was by the bridge.

At Gatebeck, there was a network of weirs and channels which supplied water to industrial buildings to the north of the Gatebeck Bridge. Four weirs are marked on old maps, and the buildings are also served by the Gatebeck Tramway. Below Gatebeck Bridge there is another weir and a long mill race to the east of the main channel within the powder works. Gatebeck Mill produced gunpowder. Production of gunpowder for use in mines and quarries began in 1852 and around 20 tons were manufactured each week. It was shipped to northern England and Wales, and was also exported to West Africa and India. The site occupied around 70 acres (28 ha), with the area now occupied by Gatebeck Caravan Park and Millbrook Caravan Park being used first. Mills were built on both sides of Peasey Beck, which were linked together by internal tramways. Peasey Beck provided the power, but later on, steam engines were used. The finished product was packed into barrels, which were manufactured by Gatebeck Cooperage, and was transported to Milnthorpe railway station by closed horsedrawn carts. From 1874, a tramway was used to move the gunpowder to the station. It ran alongside Peasey Beck to the A65 road, but motive power was still provided by horses, which were shod with brass shoes to prevent the risk of sparks. The site closed in 1937, the last such facility in the area to do so, and the caravan parks opened in the early 1970s.

Kaker Mill (SD542842) is known to have been in existence since 1184, and during the 14th century was worked by monks who owned Challon Hall. It was a corn mill, and closed during the Second World War. The wheel was fed from a weir at Challon Hall, which ran along the eastern edge of the road, and passed under the road near the mill. The mill race was supplemented by water from Birks Beck. At Park End Mill, just below Kaker Mill, marble was cut and polished. Crooklands Mill (SD535837) started as a corn mill. The wheel was driven by a long leat which left the beck around 550 yards (500 m) upstream, and provided a fall of 20 feet (6 m). From 1805 it was used to mill flax and to produce ropes. This continued for 50 years, and it was then used to produce bobbins for the Lancashire cotton industry, until its closure in the 1930s. The mill race ran along the right bank of the river, and the weir was just downstream of the point at which the Lancaster Canal feeder left the river. Both Millness Mill (SD535829) and Milton Mill (SD530828) were corn mills, and were fed by long leats. The weir for Millness Mill was next to Peasey Bridge, which now carries the A65 road. The mill race for Milton Mill started at the point where the tail race of Millness Mill discharged water back into the river. Milton Mill was a lowder mill, where the high breast-shot water wheel is located inside the building. An annular ring was attached to the side of the wheel, which meshed with a wallower, fixed to a vertical shaft. On the floor above the wheel, a great spur wheel was attached to the vertical shaft, and a triangular lowder frame carried three smaller cogs or stone nuts, which drove the three pairs of stones resting on the frame. A fourth pair of stones was added around 1900, giving the lowder frame a bulge on one side. When the mill was listed in 1962, the mill wheel and all of the machinery were still in situ, and this was still the case in 1978.

== Water quality ==
The Environment Agency measure water quality of the river systems in England. Each is given an overall ecological status, which may be one of five levels: high, good, moderate, poor and bad. There are several components that are used to determine this, including biological status, which looks at the quantity and varieties of invertebrates, angiosperms and fish. Chemical status, which compares the concentrations of various chemicals against known safe concentrations, is rated good or fail.

The water quality of the Peasey Beck was as follows in 2019. The data only includes a short section above Killington Reservoir.

Section	Ecological status	Chemical status	Length	Catchment	Channel
Peasey Beck Water Body	Good	Fail	12.2 miles (19.6 km)	15.48 square miles (40.1 km^{2})	heavily modified

Like many waterways in the UK, the chemical status changed from good to fail in 2019, due to the presence of polybrominated diphenyl ethers (PBDE) and mercury compounds, neither of which had previously been included in the assessment.

== See also ==
- List of rivers of England

== Bibliography ==
- CAfS (2019). "A Tale of Two Hydros" (PDF). Cumbria Action for Sustainability. Archived (PDF) from the original on 24 September 2021.
- CEC (2018). "Hydroelectric Scheme – Killington Reservoir Overspill". Community Energy Cumbria. Archived from the original on 26 September 2022.
- Davies-Shiel, Mike (1978). Watermills of Cumbria. Dalesman Publishing. ISBN 978-0-85206-467-2.
- Hadfield, Charles; Biddle, Gordon (1970). The Canals of North West England, Vol 1 (pp.1-236). David and Charles. ISBN 978-0-7153-4956-4.
- Various (1990). A journey through Endmoor in times gone by. Written to celebrate the building of a new school at Endmoor.
