= Old Hutton and Holmescales =

Civil parish in Cumbria, England

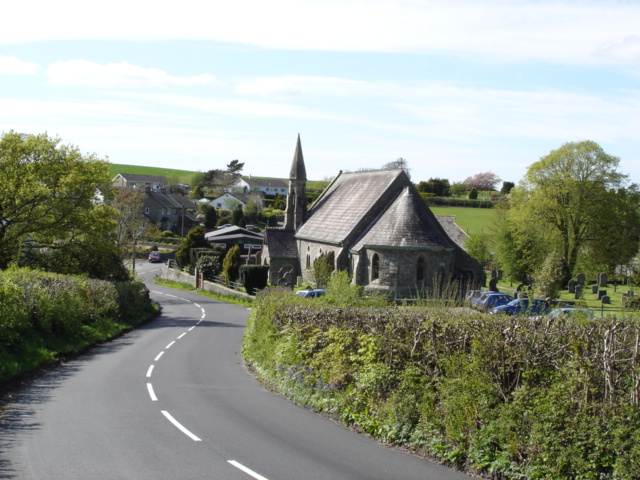
- St John the Baptist's Church, Old Hutton

- Location in South Lakeland Location within Cumbria
- Population: 417
- Civil parish: Old Hutton and Holmescales
- Unitary authority: Westmorland and Furness
- Ceremonial county: Cumbria
- Region: North West
- Country: England
- Sovereign state: United Kingdom
- Post town: KENDAL
- Postcode district: LA8
- Dialling code: 01539
- Police: Cumbria
- Fire: Cumbria
- Ambulance: North West
- UK Parliament: Westmorland and Lonsdale

Old Hutton and Holmescales is a civil parish in the Westmorland and Furness district, in the county of Cumbria, England. In the 2001 census the parish had a population of 357, increasing at the 2011 census to 417. The parish is bordered by the civil parishes of New Hutton, Stainton, Preston Richard, Preston Patrick, Killington, and Lupton.

The parish includes the villages and hamlets of Old Hutton, Holmescales and Middleshaw. There are eight listed buildings in Old Hutton and Holmescales, one of grade II* and seven of grade II.

Holmescales was described in 1870–1872 as "a hamlet in Old Hutton-with-Holmescales township".

== History ==
Old Hutton and Holmescales became a civil parish in 1866.
