= Listed buildings in Preston Patrick =

Preston Patrick is a civil parish in Westmorland and Furness, Cumbria, England. It contains 25 listed buildings that are recorded in the National Heritage List for England. Of these, one is listed at Grade II*, the middle of the three grades, and the others are at Grade II, the lowest grade. The parish contains the villages of Preston Patrick and Crooklands, and is otherwise mainly rural. The Lancaster Canal passes through the parish, and the listed buildings associated with it are bridges, an aqueduct, and milestones. The other listed buildings consist of houses and associated structures, farmhouses, farm buildings, boundary stones, milestones on roads, a Quaker meeting house, and a church.

== Key ==
Grade	Criteria
II*	Particularly important buildings of more than special interest
II	Buildings of national importance and special interest

== Buildings ==
Name and location	Photograph	Date	Notes	Grade
Preston Patrick Hall; 54.24737°N 2.70084°W		Late 14th century (probable)	A hall house with cross-wings that has been remodelled, heightened and altered. It is in stone with sandstone quoins, and has a green slate roof with a stone ridge and copings. There are two storeys, a central block of three bays flanked by gabled cross-wings. On the front is a gabled slated porch with bargeboards. Most of the windows are sash windows, and there are also traceried windows and other openings, some with hood moulds.	II*
Bank barns, Preston Patrick Hall; 54.24719°N 2.70036°W	—	17th century (possible)	The barns were altered and extended later. They consist of a range of bank barns over cow houses, and are in stone with limestone quoins, and have green slate roofs with stone ridges. The left part contains openings with stone or timber lintels, the openings in the middle part have segmental heads, and the right part they have timber lintels and an inserted traceried window.	II
Moss End Farmhouse; 54.23163°N 2.71413°W	—	Early 18th century (probable)	A roughcast farmhouse with sandstone dressings and a green slate roof with a stone ridge and copings. There are two storeys with attics and five bays. On the front is a later gabled slated porch, and the doorway has a moulded lintel. The windows are sashes.	II
Wath Sutton Farmhouse; 54.23740°N 2.72306°W	—	Early 18th century	The farmhouse is pebbledashed and has a green slate roof with a stone ridge. There are two storeys with attics and five bays. In the centre is a gabled porch, and all the windows are 20th-century casements. Inside many original features have been retained.	II
Summerdale House; 54.23087°N 2.69864°W	—	1736	Originally a vicarage, later a private house, it was remodelled and extended to the right in the 19th century. The house is in stone, partly rendered, with limestone quoins, a sill band, a moulded cornice, and a green slate roof with a stone ridge. There are two storeys, a main block with a symmetrical front of three bays, and a lower extension to the right. The central doorway has a limestone doorcase with pilasters and an entablature, and a decorative fanlight. The windows in the main block are sashes, and in the extension they are casements.	II
Barn and other farm buildings, Moss End Farm; 54.23199°N 2.71426°W	—	18th century (probable)	The buildings consist of a barn with a cow house beneath it, and a wagon shed and stores at right angles. They are in limestone with quoins, and have green slate roofs with stone ridges. The barn has ten bays, and contains a ramp leading to a wagon entrance, four openings in the upper floor and five in the ground floor. On the gables are ball finials.	II
Spout House Farmhouse; 54.22993°N 2.69398°W	—	Late 18th or early 19th century (probable)	The farmhouse was remodelled in the late 19th century. It is in limestone with sandstone dressings, chamfered quoins, and a green slate roof with a stone ridge. There are two storeys and three bays. The central doorway has a stone surround with a cornice, the windows are sashes, and at the rear is a tall stair window.	II
Challon Hall; 54.25503°N 2.70359°W	—	1760 or earlier	A roughcast house with stone dressings, a band, and a green slate roof with a stone ridge. There are two storeys and five bays. The central doorway has a moulded surround and a lintel decorated with an ogee pattern and rosettes. In the right gable is a pediment with a plaque containing initials, the date, scrolling, and an egg and dart surround.	II
Dovehouses Bridge; 54.23034°N 2.70860°W		c. 1816	The bridge carries Dovehouses Lane over the Lancaster Canal. It is in limestone, and consists of a single elliptical arch. The bridge has string courses, rusticated voussoirs and keystones, and shallow arched parapets with coping and end pilasters. The width of the bridge between the parapets is about 3.5 metres (11 ft).	II
Millness Bridge; 54.24098°N 2.71216°W		c. 1816	The bridge carries Millness Lane over the Lancaster Canal. It is in limestone, and consists of a single elliptical arch. The bridge has string courses, rusticated voussoirs and keystones, and ramped parapets with a slightly curved plan, coping, and end pilasters. The width of the bridge between the parapets is about 3.5 metres (11 ft).	II
Seven Milestone Bridge; 54.23709°N 2.70972°W		c. 1816	The bridge carries the A65 road over the Lancaster Canal. It is in limestone, and consists of a single elliptical arch. The bridge has string courses, rusticated voussoirs and keystones, and shallow arched parapets with a slightly curved plan, coping, and end pilasters. The width of the bridge between the parapets is about 6 metres (20 ft).	II
Canal milestone near Crooklands aqueduct 54.24307°N 2.71454°W	—	c. 1816	The milestone is on the towpath of the Lancaster Canal. It is in limestone and consists of an upright post with a rounded top. It is inscribed with numbers in ovals representing the distances in miles to Lancaster and Kendal.	II
Canal milestone near Dovehouses Bridge; 54.22960°N 2.70906°W		c. 1816	The milestone is on the towpath of the Lancaster Canal. It is in limestone and consists of an upright post with a rounded top. It is inscribed with numbers in ovals representing the distances in miles to Lancaster and Kendal.	II
Aqueduct over Peasey Beck; 54.24390°N 2.71537°W		c. 1818	The aqueduct carries the Lancaster Canal over Peasey Beck. It is in limestone, and consists of two shallow elliptical arches with a central cutwater. The aqueduct has a string course, copings, rusticated voussoirs, and curved retaining walls. It is about 30 feet (9.1 m) wide.	II
Boundary Stone adjacent to Barkinbeck Bridge; 54.25918°N 2.64527°W		Early 19th century (probable)	The boundary stone is in limestone, and consists of an upright stone with deep chamfers. It is inscribed with the names of the parishes of Preston Patrick and of Lupton.	II
Boundary stone near Crosslands Farm; 54.27205°N 2.65793°W	—	Early 19th century (possible)	The milestone is about 2 feet (0.61 m) high, and has a triangular plan and a domical top. It is inscribed with the names of the parishes of Old Hutton and of Preston Patrick.	II
Barn, Spout House Farm; 54.22971°N 2.69381°W	—	Early 19th century (probable)	This consists of a barn with a cow house and a cart shed beneath, and a store at right angles. It is in limestone with through-stones, quoins, and a green slate roof with a stone ridge and copings. It contains a wagon door with a segmental head and voussoirs, doors, and a casement window.	II
Boundary stone near Spout House Farmhouse; 54.22771°N 2.69072°W	—	Early 19th century (possible)	The boundary stone is in limestone, and consists of an upright stone with deep chamfers. It is inscribed with the names of the parishes of Preston Patrick and of Lupton.	II
Milestone near Barkin House; 54.26229°N 2.65013°W		Early 19th century (probable)	The milestone is in limestone and consists of an upright stone with a round head and chamfers. It is inscribed with the distances in miles to Kirkby Lonsdale and to Kendal.	II
Waggon shed and barn, Preston Patrick Hall; 54.24711°N 2.70096°W	—	Early 19th century (probable)	The wagon shed and barn are in stone with limestone quoins, and have a green slate roof, hipped to the north, with a stone ridge. The building contains a wagon door with a segmental-arched head and limestone voussoirs, and two tiers of ventilation slits.	II
Garden walls and gateways, Summerdale House; 54.23075°N 2.69817°W	—	Early 19th century (probable)	The walls are on the north and east sides of the garden. They are in stone with limestone copings, and are between 2.4 metres (7 ft 10 in) and 3 metres (9.8 ft) high. In the east wall is a round-arched opening with voussoirs and a wooden gate. The north wall contains an opening with a stone lintel and a wrought iron gate, and attached to the wall is a small arch with limestone voussoirs.	II
Milestone near Summerdale House; 54.23171°N 2.69877°W	—	Early 19th century (probable)	The milestone is in limestone and consists of an upright stone with a round head and chamfers. It is inscribed with the distances in miles to Kirkby Lonsdale and to Kendal.	II
Milestone near Seven Milestone Bridge; 54.23747°N 2.70962°W	—	1826	The milestone was provided for the Heronsyke Turnpike. It is in cast iron, and is half-hexagonal with fluted faces and a domed top. The milestone is inscribed with the distances in miles to Burton-in-Kendal and to Kendal.	II
St Patrick's Church; 54.24524°N 2.71189°W		1852–53	The church was designed by Sharpe and Paley in Perpendicular style, and the chancel was rebuilt by their successors, Paley, Austin and Paley in 1891–92. It is built in limestone on a chamfered plinth, with sandstone dressings in the chancel, a cornice, and it has a slate roof with a stone ridge and copings. The church consists of a nave, a north aisle, a south porch, a chancel, a north vestry, and a west tower. The tower has four stages, diagonal buttresses, an embattled parapet, and there is an octagonal stair turret at the southwest corner rising to a higher level. Incorporated in the church are 15th-century items from an earlier church, namely, a window in the tower, and niches in the chancel.	II
Preston Patrick Quaker Meeting House, associated buildings and walls 54.25011°N 2.70435°W	—	1869	The buildings are constructed in limestone with Westmorland slate roofs. The meeting house has a rectangular plan, three bays, a gabled porch and a lean-to, and the windows are segmental-headed sashes. Attached at right angles is the caretaker's house, with two storeys, a gabled porch, quoins, and bargeboards. Detached from these are a combined gighouse, stable and school room, with two storeys, quoins, and casement windows, and on the west side is an external stair turret with a pyramidal roof. The burial ground is enclosed by a low stone wall, and at the front is a gateway with rectangular tapering stone gate piers.	II
