= Listed buildings in Stainton (near Kendal) =

Stainton is a civil parish in the Westmorland and Furness district of Cumbria, England. It contains eleven listed buildings that are recorded in the National Heritage List for England. All the listed buildings are designated at Grade II, the lowest of the three grades, which is applied to "buildings of national importance and special interest". The parish contains the village of Stainton, and is otherwise rural. The Lancaster Canal passes through the parish and a number of structures associated with it are listed. The other listed buildings include a farmhouse, a packhorse bridge, a church, a boundary stone, a boundary post, and a milestone.

== Buildings ==
Name and location	Photograph	Date	Notes
Sellet Hall; 54.26327°N 2.74003°W	—	Late 16th century (probable)	A farmhouse that was later extended and altered, it is in roughcast stone and has a slate roof with a stone ridge. There are two storeys, three irregular bays, a 17th-century staircase wing, and an extension to the south added in the 19th century. In the centre of the front is a gabled porch. In the original part are cross-windows with mullions, some with casements, and some with hood moulds. The windows in the extension are casements.
Packhorse bridge 54.26656°N 2.73274°W		17th century (probable)	The packhorse bridge crosses Stainton Beck. It is in limestone and consists of a single segmental arch. The bridge has roughly cut parapets and voussoirs, and is about 3 feet (0.91 m) wide between the parapets. The bridge is also a scheduled monument.
United Reformed Church; 54.26719°N 2.72939°W		17th century	Originally an Independent Chapel, it was extended in the 19th century, and later became a United Reformed Church. It is in roughcast stone with a slate roof. The original part has one storey, and the extension has two. The building contains a doorway with a moulded architrave, and casement windows.
Stainton Bridge; 54.26053°N 2.73415°W		17th or early 18th century (possible)	The bridge carries a road over Stainton Beck. It is in limestone and consists of a shallow segmental arch. The bridge has voussoirs and sloping parapets with coping.
Stainton Aqueduct; 54.26212°N 2.73422°W		c. 1818	The aqueduct carries the Lancaster Canal over Stainton Beck and a public footpath. It is in limestone, and consists of a single segmental arch. The aqueduct has rusticated voussoirs, string courses, a coped parapets, and curved retaining walls.
Stainton Bridge End; 54.26084°N 2.73198°W		c. 1818	An accommodation bridge, number 170, over the Lancaster Canal, it is in limestone, and consists of a single elliptical arch. The bridge has rusticated voussoirs, keystones, string courses, and parapets with pilasters at the western end. The bridge is about 10 feet (3.0 m) wide between the parapets.
Stainton Crossing Bridge; 54.26222°N 2.73784°W		c. 1818	The bridge carries a road over the Lancaster Canal. It is in limestone, and consists of a single elliptical arch. The bridge has rusticated voussoirs, keystones, string courses, and shallow arched parapets, slightly curved in plan, with pilasters at each end. The bridge is about 15 feet (4.6 m) wide between the parapets.
Boundary Post near Punch Bowl Public House; 54.28852°N 2.72922°W		1825	The boundary post is in cast iron, and is half-hexagonal with a fluted face and a domed top. It is inscribed with the names of the parishes of Heversham and Kendal, although it now stands on the boundary between Natland and Stainton.
Boundary stone near Storth End Farmhouse; 54.27629°N 2.71729°W		Early 19th century (probable)	The boundary stone is in limestone, and consists of an upright stone with chamfers. It is inscribed with the names of the parishes of Preston Richard and of Stainton.
Milestone near Storth End; 54.27726°N 2.71919°W		1826	The milestone, provided for the turnpike road, is a cast iron. It has a half-hexagonal plan, with fluted faces and a domed top. It is inscribed with the distances in miles to Burton-in-Kendal and to Kendal.
Tethering post 54.26175°N 2.73289°W	—	Uncertain	The tethering post is on the towpath of the Lancaster Canal. It consists of an upright limestone post with an iron ring set into its side.
