= Listed buildings in Preston Richard =

Preston Richard is a civil parish in the Westmorland and Furness District of Cumbria, England. It contains 14 listed buildings that are recorded in the National Heritage List for England. All the listed buildings are designated at Grade II, the lowest of the three grades, which is applied to "buildings of national importance and special interest". The parish contains the villages of Endmoor and Crooklands and is otherwise almost entirely rural. The Lancaster Canal runs through the parish, and the listed buildings associated with this are four bridges, an aqueduct, and a milestone. The other listed buildings consist of houses and associated structures, farmhouses, a former mill, two road milestones, and a boundary stone.

== Buildings ==
Name and location	Photograph	Date	Notes
Storth End Farmhouse; 54.27612°N 2.71702°W	—	Late 17th or early 18th century	A roughcast farmhouse that has a green slate roof with a stone ridge. There are two storeys with attics, four bays, and an extension. On the front is a gabled porch, and the windows are casements. In the roof are four upper crucks.
Milton Mill House and Mill; 54.23935°N 2.72184°W	—	Early 18th century	The mill owner's house was extended in 1863. It is roughcast with through-stones, quoins in the extension, string courses, and a green slate roof. There are three storeys and three irregular bays. On the front is a central gabled porch with decorative bargeboards and a doorway with a segmental head. The windows in the ground floor are sashes, in the middle floor are casements, and the top floor has a mix of both types. The mill has a working mill wheel and machinery.
High Banks Farmhouse, barn, walls and railings 54.24038°N 2.72375°W	—	18th century (probable)	The house and barn are in stone and have a green slate roof with a stone ridge. The house has two storeys and two bays. In the centre is a gabled porch containing side benches, and with moulded bargeboards and a ball finial. The windows are casements. The higher barn is to the left, and one bay has been incorporated into the house. On the front of the barn are two doors and a loading door, at the rear is a wagon entrance with a canopy and dove holes in the gable, and on the roof is a cast iron weathervane. In front of the garden are low limestone walls with wrought iron railings and monolithic gateposts.
Birkrigg Park Farmhouse; 54.27757°N 2.70393°W	—	1742	The farmhouse is in stone on a plinth, and has limestone quoins, a cornice, and a green slate roof with stone copings. There are two storeys with attics, and three bays. In the centre is a porch with pilasters and a flat hood on consoles, and the windows are sashes. To the left is a single-storey extension with decorative bargeboards, and in the right return is a gabled porch with decorative bargeboards and a finial.
Aqueduct over Peasey Beck; 54.24390°N 2.71537°W		c. 1818	The aqueduct carries the Lancaster Canal over Peasey Beck. It is in limestone, and consists of two shallow elliptical arches with a central cutwater. The aqueduct has a string course, copings, rusticated voussoirs, and curved retaining walls. It is about 30 feet (9.1 m) wide.
Crooklands Bridge; 54.24576°N 2.71681°W		c. 1818	The bridge carries the B6385 road over the Lancaster Canal. It is in limestone, and consists of a single elliptical arch. The bridge has string courses, rusticated voussoirs and keystones, and shallow arched parapets with a slightly curved plan, coping, and end pilasters.
Field End Bridge; 54.25829°N 2.72918°W		c. 1818	The bridge carries Commonmire Lane over the Lancaster Canal. It is in limestone, and consists of a single elliptical arch. The bridge has string courses, rusticated voussoirs and keystones, and shallow arched parapets with a slightly curved plan, coping, and end pilasters. It is about 12 feet (3.7 m) wide between the parapets.
Mattinson's Bridge; 54.24895°N 2.73076°W		c. 1818	An accommodation bridge over the Lancaster Canal, it is in limestone, and consists of a single elliptical arch. The bridge has string courses, rusticated voussoirs and keystones, and shallow arched parapets with a slightly curved plan, coping, and end pilasters. It is about 10 feet (3.0 m) wide between the parapets.
Old Hall Bridge; 54.24784°N 2.72441°W		c. 1818	An accommodation bridge over the Lancaster Canal, it is in limestone, and consists of a single elliptical arch. The bridge has string courses, rusticated voussoirs and keystones, and shallow arched parapets with a slightly curved plan, coping, and end pilasters. It is about 10 feet (3.0 m) wide between the parapets.
Canal milestone near Mattinson's Bridge; 54.25256°N 2.73189°W	—	c. 1818	The milestone is on the Lancaster Canal. It is in limestone and consists of an upright post with a rounded top. It is inscribed with numbers in ovals representing the distances in miles to Lancaster and Kendal.
Milestone near Lane Farm; 54.24414°N 2.72970°W		Early 19th century (probable)	The milestone is in limestone and consists of an upright stone with a round head and chamfers. It is inscribed with the distances in miles to nearby places. On the east side is a benchmark.
Boundary stone near Storth End Farmhouse; 54.27629°N 2.71729°W	—	Early 19th century (probable)	The boundary stone is in limestone, and consists of an upright stone with chamfers. It is inscribed with the names of the parishes of Preston Richard and of Stainton.
Milestone near South Lodge; 54.25136°N 2.71473°W	—	1826	The milestone was provided for the turnpike. It is in cast iron, and is half-hexagonal with fluted faces and a domed top. The milestone is inscribed with the distances in miles to Burton-in-Kendal and to Kendal.
Privy, High Banks Farmhouse; 54.24033°N 2.72390°W	—	19th century (probable)	The privy is in stone and has a green slate roof with ball finials on both gables.
