= Halfpenny, Cumbria =

Coordinates: 54°16′48″N 2°42′52″W

Halfpenny
- Hamlet
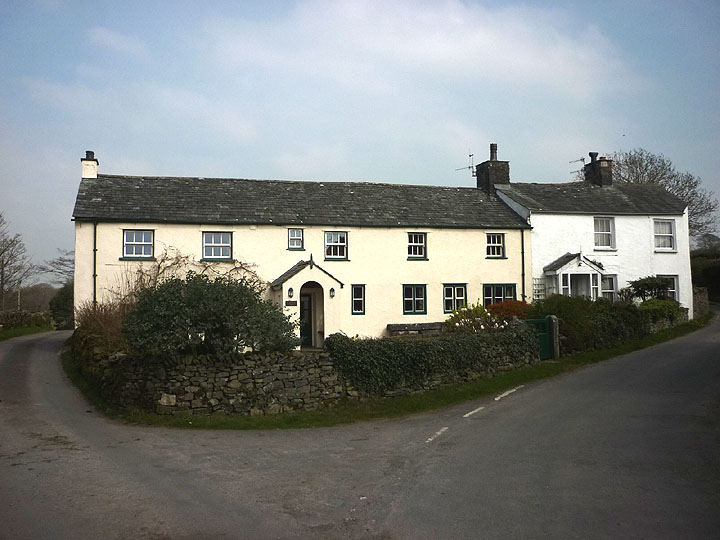
- Cottages at Halfpenny Farm.

- Location within Cumbria
- Civil parish: Stainton
- Unitary authority: Westmorland and Furness
- Ceremonial county: Cumbria
- Region: North West
- Country: England
- Sovereign state: United Kingdom
- Post town: KENDAL
- Dialling code: 015395
- Police: Cumbria
- Fire: Cumbria
- Ambulance: North West

Halfpenny is a hamlet in the civil parish of Stainton, in the Westmorland and Furness district, in the county of Cumbria, England. It is located roughly two and a half miles south east of Kendal. There is notably a ford over St Sunday's Beck, a tributary to the River Bela. Until sometime in the 20th century, there was also a watermill – Halfpenny Mill – in the village, which was by the mid-19th century producing flax, and then coconut matting, paper, and sweet manufacture. Halfpenny is accessible off of the A65.
