= Joule effect =

Physical effects characterized by James Prescott Joule

Joule effect and Joule's law are any of several different physical effects discovered or characterized by English physicist James Prescott Joule. These physical effects are not the same, but all are frequently or occasionally referred to in the literature as the "Joule effect" or "Joule law" These physical effects include:

- "Joule's first law" (Joule heating), a physical law expressing the relationship between the heat generated and the current flowing through a conductor.
- Joule's second law states that the internal energy of an ideal gas is independent of its volume and pressure, depending only on its temperature.
- Magnetostriction, a property of ferromagnetic materials that causes them to change their shape when subjected to a magnetic field.
- The Joule effect (during Joule expansion), the temperature change of a gas (usually cooling) when it is allowed to expand freely.
- The Joule–Thomson effect, the temperature change of a gas when it is forced through a valve or porous plug while keeping it insulated so that no heat is exchanged with the environment.
- The Gough–Joule effect or the Gow–Joule effect, which is the tendency of elastomers to contract if heated while they are under tension.

== Joule's first law ==
Between 1840 and 1843, Joule carefully studied the heat produced by an electric current. From this study, he developed Joule's laws of heating, the first of which is commonly referred to as the Joule effect. Joule's first law expresses the relationship between heat generated in a conductor and current flow, resistance, and time.

== Magnetostriction ==
The magnetostriction effect describes a property of ferromagnetic materials which causes them to change their shape when subjected to a magnetic field. Joule first reported observing the change in the length of ferromagnetic rods in 1842.

== Joule expansion ==
In 1845, Joule studied the free expansion of a gas into a larger volume. This became known as Joule expansion. The cooling of a gas by allowing it to expand freely is occasionally referred to as the Joule effect.

== Gough–Joule effect ==
If an elastic band is first stretched and then subjected to heating, it will shrink rather than expand. This effect was first observed by John Gough in 1802, and was investigated further by Joule in the 1850s, when it then became known as the Gough–Joule effect.
Examples in Literature:

- Popular Science magazine, January 1972: "A stretched piece of rubber contracts when heated. In doing so, it exerts a measurable increase in its pull. This surprising property of rubber was first observed by James Prescott Joule about a hundred years ago and is known as the Joule effect."
- Rubber as an Engineering Material (book), by Khairi Nagdi: "The Joule effect is a phenomenon of practical importance that machine designers must consider. The simplest way of demonstrating this effect is to suspend a weight on a rubber band sufficient to elongate it by at least 50%. When an infrared lamp warms up the stretched rubber band, it does not elongate because of thermal expansion, as may be expected, but it retracts and lifts the weight."

== See also ==
- Joule–Thomson effect
