= Listed buildings in Old Hutton and Holmescales =

Old Hutton and Holmescales is a civil parish in the Westmorland and Furness district of Cumbria, England. It contains eight listed buildings that are recorded in the National Heritage List for England. Of these, one is listed at Grade II*, the middle of the three grades, and the others are at Grade II, the lowest grade. The parish contains the village of Old Hutton and the hamlet of Middleshaw, and is otherwise entirely rural. The listed buildings consist of three houses, a former gateway, three milestones and a boundary stone.

== Key ==
Grade	Criteria
II*	Particularly important buildings of more than special interest
II	Buildings of national importance and special interest

== Buildings ==
Name and location	Photograph	Date	Notes	Grade
Blease Hall; 54.29615°N 2.69409°W		c. 1600 (probable)	Originally a hall house, the south cross-wing was demolished in the early 19th century. It is in stone with quoins and has a slate roof with moulded copings. There are two storeys with attics and cellars, and four bays. At the entrance is a 20th-century gabled porach, and most of the windows are mullioned and transomed.	II*
Original gateway, Blease Hall; 54.29617°N 2.69447°W	—	c. 1600 (possible)	The original entrance to the hall has been partly demolished. It is in ashlar stone, and the wicket gate has survived intact; this has a segmental head and a chamfered architrave. Parts of the jambs of a wagon arch have similar moulding, and are embedded in a garden wall.	II
Bridge House; 54.29027°N 2.67062°W	—	Mid 18th century	The house is slate-hung with an eaves band, moulded gutters with dentils, and a slate roof. There are two storeys and a symmetrical front of five bays. Steps lead up to the central door, and the windows are sashes.	II
Boundary stone 54.27205°N 2.65793°W	—	Early 19th century (possible)	The milestone is about 2 feet (0.61 m) high, and has a triangular plan and a domical top. It is inscribed with the names of the parishes of Old Hutton and of Preston Patrick.	II
Milestone near Crosslands Farm; 54.27548°N 2.65813°W	—	Early 19th century (possible)	The milestone is about 2 feet (0.61 m) high, and has a triangular plan and a domical top. It is inscribed with the distances in miles to Kirkby Lonsdale and to Kendal.	II
Milestone near Hutton Yeat; 54.28845°N 2.66830°W	—	Early 19th century (possible)	The milestone is about 2 feet (0.61 m) high, and has a triangular plan and a domical top. It is inscribed with the distances in miles to Kirkby Lonsdale and to Kendal.	II
Milestone near Middleshaw Crescent; 54.29724°N 2.68762°W		Early 19th century (possible)	The milestone is about 2 feet (0.61 m) high, and has a triangular plan and a domical top. It is inscribed with the distances in miles to Kirkby Lonsdale and to Kendal.	II
Claremont Cottage; 54.28649°N 2.66866°W	—	Mid 19th century	A rendered stone house with a slate roof. There are two storeys, a symmetrical front of three bays, and a rear wing. In the centre is an open gabled porch, and the windows are recessed bows.	II
