= Electroshapable material =

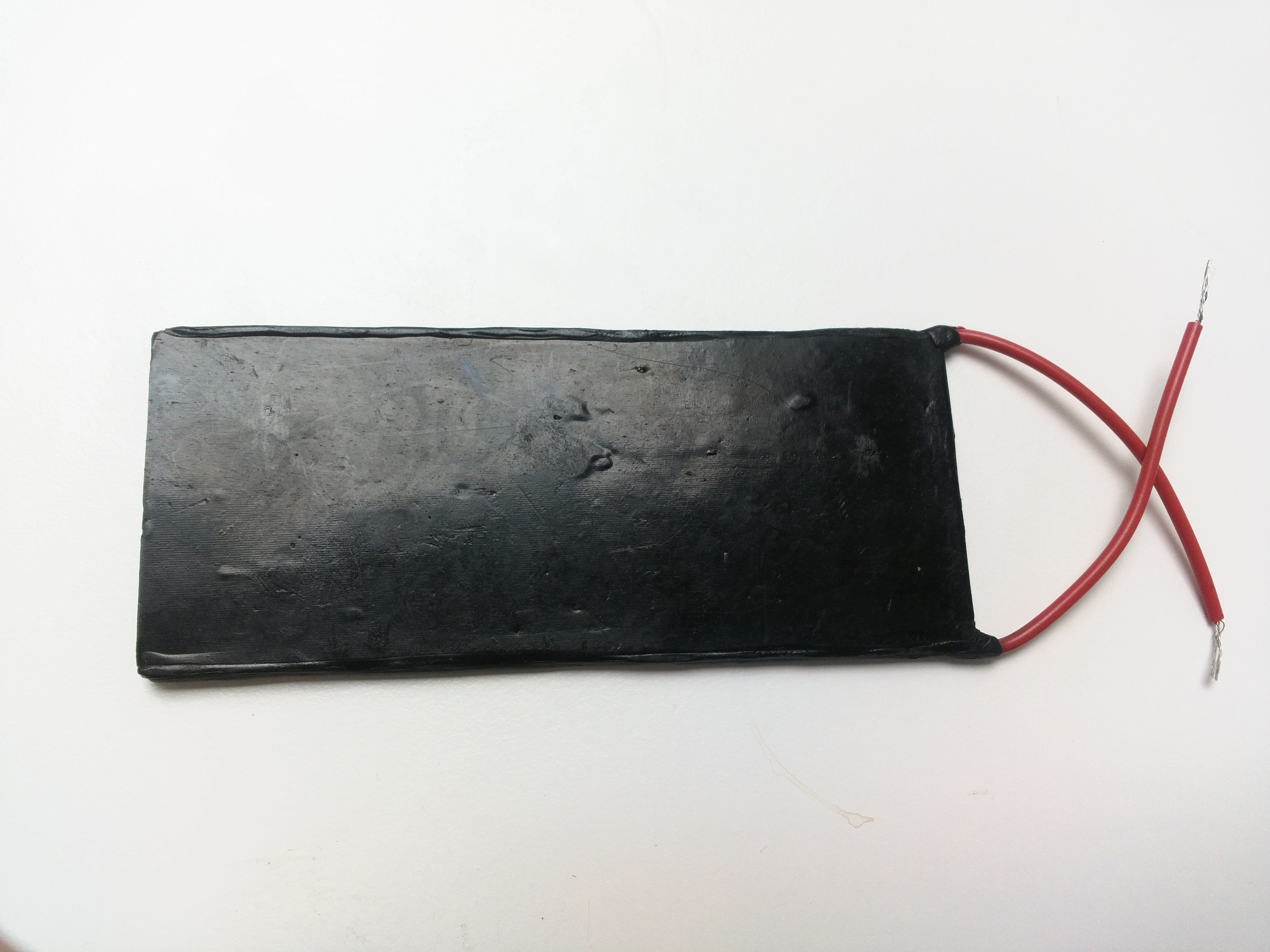

Electroshapable materials are composite materials from the class of thermoplastic materials. Electroshapable materials are plastics rigid at room temperature, which can take the form of various objects or plastic elements. They can substitute for more common thermoplastic polymers such as PVC, PE, PC, EVA.

The particularity of electroshapable materials lies in their ability to become fluid and malleable when an electric voltage is applied to two ends of the material, before becoming rigid again after the voltage is removed. This process can be reversible. This behavior makes thermoforming fast, reversible and easy to use for many applications. One of the major benefits is the improved comfort of everyday products in contact with the human body.

Electroshapable materials are particularly useful in so-called thermoformable products, particularly in the field of sports equipment (e.g. ski boots, soles, body protections) and in the medical sector (e.g. splints).

Electroshapable materials should not be confused with electroactive polymers because they are not based on the same physical principle.

== Physical principle ==
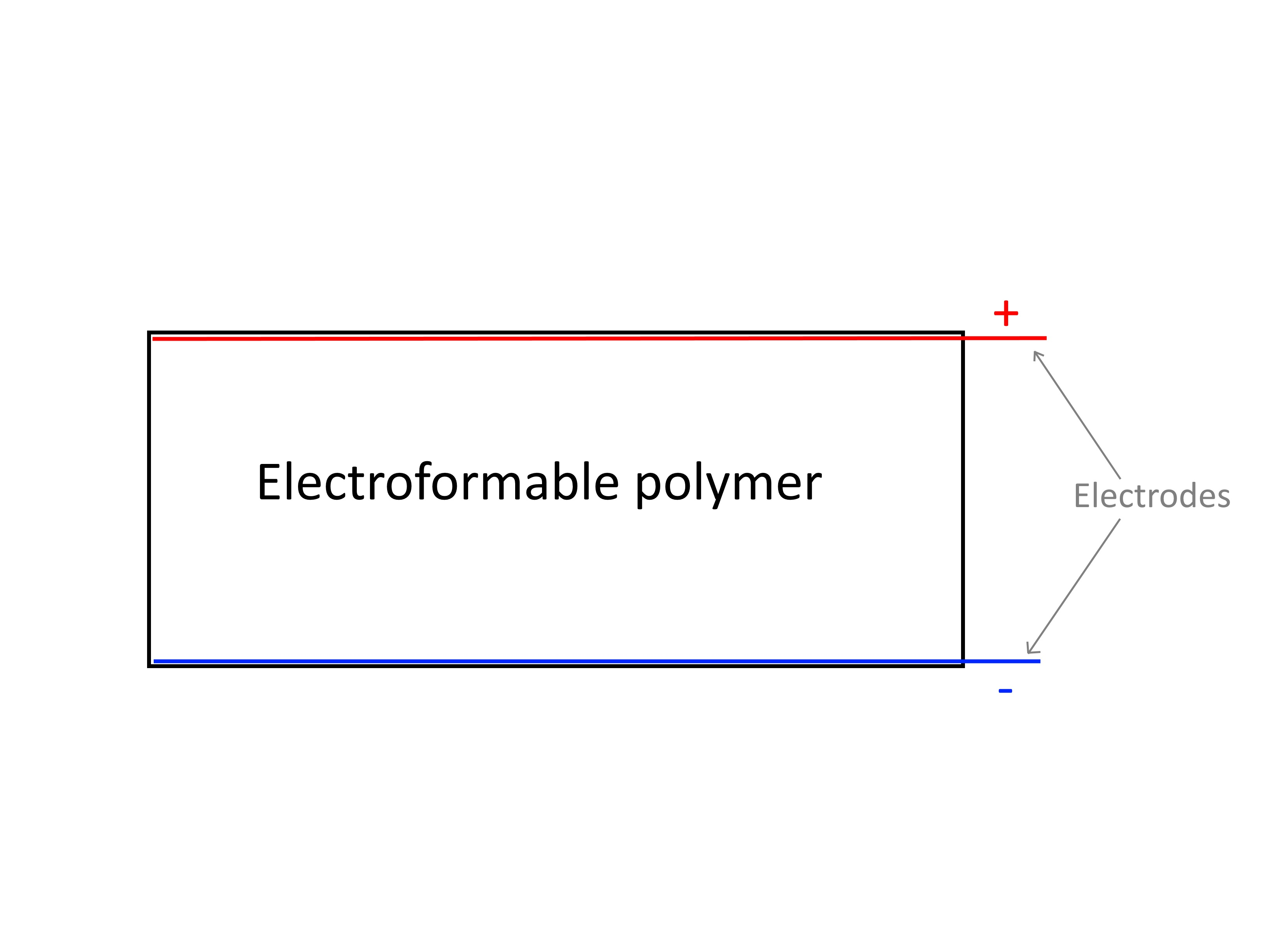

Electroshapable materials are based on a relatively simple physical principle: it is in fact an electrically conductive thermoplastic material in which are positioned two electrodes for applying an electrical voltage.

When an electrical voltage is applied, the polymer will act as a heating resistor because of its resistivity. It will heat up homogeneously by the Joule effect until it reaches its melting temperature, beyond which it becomes sufficiently viscous to be malleable to the hand.

Ideally the thermoplastic polymer selected has a relatively low melting temperature (60 °C for example) so that the user can handle it without danger of burning and to reduce the amount of energy required for the transition.

Any voltage can be used, both direct current and alternating current. However, the electric power required to do the rigid-malleable transition is proportional to the mass of electroshapable materials to be deformed. Depending on the mass of the element, it will be required a minimum electrical power to achieve the melting temperature. The current is determined by the resistance of the electroshapable element to melt. Thus by the geometry of the element and by the resistivity of the material.

== History ==
Electrically conductive polymers or composites have existed since the 1970s.

However, the concept of electroshapable materials is quite recent; it was developed for the first time in France in 2015 by Pierre-Louis Boyer and Alexis Robert.

== Uses ==
=== Lack of adaptation of mass produced products ===
Some rigid objects in contact with the human body have a need to adapt to the morphology of the user, in order to distribute the pressure over the entire human-object interface. In order to improve the comfort of the user and to avoid pressure points, which can cause bedsores.

This need to adapt rigid forms comes from the extreme variability of anatomy between individuals; most mass production processes are not adapted to meet this variability. Indeed, these methods are generally optimized to make a single shape, often from a mold or die (for example: plastic injection, metal foil stamping). To address this problem of morphological diversity, manufacturers often have to multiply industrial tools in order to offer several dimensions or shapes to their products. The most prominent example is shoes for which there can be up to fifteen to twenty different sizes. Which is very difficult to handle because:

- Cost: Industrial tools such as injection molds are very expensive. Required investment is proportional to the number of reference.
- Logistics: With an increasing number of references the stock management also becomes more complicated. Moreover, the manufacturers are very limited in number of product variations, because each is multiplying the number of references. For example, if a shoe manufacturer who proposes a model in fifteen sizes wishes to produce a product in three different colors, he will have to manage 3 × 15, or 45 references. If it wants to make two models, one for large foot and one for thin foot, it will double again to 90 references.

Limited by the number of variations, the designers can hardly answer all the anatomical specificities of the individuals. The most common strategic option is to address the products to the physical characteristics of the average individual, which is expected to match the majority of customers, but leaves a significant fringe of users unsatisfied.

=== Thermoformable products ===
The so-called thermoformable products (which use thermoplastic elements often at low melting temperature such as PCL) are a solution allowing products to adapt to the anatomy of the user.

Thermoformable products make it possible to adapt an initially standard shape to the anatomy of the user, making it possible to adapt more finely to each user than is possible through product variations. Many current applications use the principle of thermoforming, such as: ski boots, shoe soles, medical splints.

One of the limitations of these products using conventional thermoplastics is the equipment required for their implementation. Indeed, the heat energy required to raise the material to its melting point is generally provided by the use of an oven or a water bath.

The electroshapable materials also make it possible to form product to the user anatomy.

==== Advantages ====
- Making the work easier for the end user, who simply needs to connect the product to a calibrated power source.
- Speed of the forming process because the material heats intrinsically and homogeneously by Joule effect. So it can melt in seconds, making the whole forming process under a minute.

==== Disadvantages ====
- Need for a power supply.
- The use of a power supply requires compliance with safety standards, especially if the voltage used is greater than 50 V.
