= John Audland =

Welsh cricketer and cleric

Personal information
- Full name: John Heslop Audland
- Born: 5 October 1852; Tintern, Monmouth
- Died: 4 October 1931 (aged 78); Ackenthwaite, Westmorland
- Source: Cricinfo, 18 March 2017

John Heslop Audland (5 October 1852 – 4 October 1931) was a Welsh cleric and cricketer.

== Life ==
The son of John Audland of Ackenthwaite, he was educated at Magdalen College School. He matriculated at Magdalen College, Oxford, in 1871, graduating B.A. in 1876, M.A. in 1878. He became a Church of England priest and was vicar of Dinton, Wiltshire, 1886–1923. Audland married Joanna Elizabeth Wilson, daughter of Edward Wilson of Ballycrana, county Cork.

Audland played one first-class match for Oxford University Cricket Club in 1875.

== See also ==
- List of Oxford University Cricket Club players
