= Fellside Wood =

- Location within Cumbria
- Interactive map of Fellside Wood

Geography
- Location: Cumbria, England
- OS grid: SD562880
- Coordinates: 54.286°N 2.673°W
- Area: 5.46 hectares (13.5 acres)

Administration
- Authority: Woodland Trust

Fellside Wood is a woodland in Cumbria, England, near the village of Old Hutton. It covers a total area of 5.46 hectares (13.5 acres). It is owned and managed by the Woodland Trust.
