= Middleshaw, Cumbria =

Hamlet in Cumbria, England

Coordinates: 54.295°N 2.684°W

Middleshaw
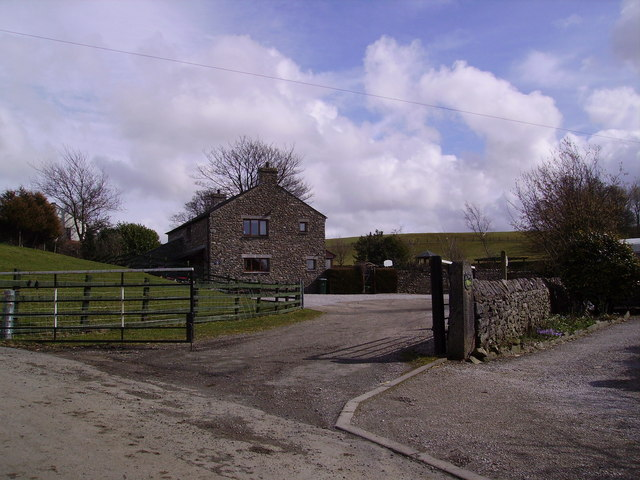
- Middleshaw

- Location within Cumbria
- OS grid reference: SD554890
- Civil parish: Old Hutton and Holmescales
- Unitary authority: Westmorland and Furness
- Ceremonial county: Cumbria
- Region: North West
- Country: England
- Sovereign state: United Kingdom
- Post town: KENDAL
- Postcode district: LA8
- Dialling code: 01539
- Police: Cumbria
- Fire: Cumbria
- Ambulance: North West
- UK Parliament: Westmorland and Lonsdale

Middleshaw is a hamlet on the B6254 road, near the village of Old Hutton, in the civil parish of Old Hutton and Holmescales, in the Westmorland and Furness district, in the ceremonial county of Cumbria, England. John Gough was from Middleshaw.

== History ==
The name "Middleshaw" means 'middle, sceaga', copse. Middleshaw was also known as Mid(d)leshaw(e).

== See also ==
- Listed buildings in Old Hutton and Holmescales
