= Saint Sunday (disambiguation) =

Saint Sunday, abbreviated as St Sunday, was a popular name for Saint Dominic in medieval and early modern Great Britain and Ireland surviving today in numerous place names. It derives from Dies Dominica, the Latin Churches name for Sunday because of its similarity to Dominic’s name.

Saint Sunday may also refer to:

== People ==
- Saint Kyriaki (died 289), Greek martyr

== In art ==
- Sunday Christ — a popular theme in medieval iconography also referred to as St Sunday.

== Places ==
- St Sunday's Beck
- St Sunday Crag
