= John Gough (natural philosopher) =

Blind English natural and experimental philosopher (1757–1825)

- Born: 15 January 1757; Kendal, Westmorland, England
- Died: 28 July 1825 (aged 68); Kendal, Westmorland, England
- Scientific career
- Fields: Polymath, natural philosopher
- Academic advisors: John Slee; George Bewley
- Notable students: John Dalton; William Whewell; Richard Dawes; Thomas Gaskin

John Gough (/ɡɒf/ GOF; 17 January 1757 – 28 July 1825) was a blind English natural and experimental philosopher who is known for his own investigations as well as the influence he had on both John Dalton and William Whewell.

== Life ==
John Gough was born in Kendal, Westmorland, on 17 January 1757, the eldest child of Nathan Gough (died 1800) and his wife, Susannah (1731–1798). Gough's father was a wool dyer and shearman dyer, while his mother was the eldest daughter of John Wilson, a prosperous farmer with an estate on the west bank of Windermere. Nathan and Susannah Gough had three sons and four daughters, one of whom died in infancy. The family belonged to the Society of Friends, whose communities flourished in Cumberland and Westmorland during this period. Before he was three years old, Gough was attacked by smallpox and lost his sight. In his childhood he expended much effort in developing his sense of touch and hearing, and appears to have been especially eager to learn to recognize animals by touch.

In 1778 at the age of twenty-one, Gough became a resident pupil of John Slee, a mathematical master at Mungrisdale, Cumberland. Gough stayed at Mungrisdale for eighteen months, following the traditional curriculum up to the elementary principles of calculus. Returning home he took up calculus, with his second sister, Dorothy Gough (born 1768), acting as his reader. From around 1782 to 1790 he enjoyed the acquaintance of John Dalton, a cousin of George Bewley and also a lakeland Quaker, who had come to Kendal to take up a position in Bewley's school. Dalton assisted Gough by reading, writing, and making calculations and diagrams on his behalf. In return Dalton, who later became one of the most eminent figures in nineteenth-century science, was tutored by Gough in Latin and Greek. Dalton later referred to Gough as a "prodigy in scientific attainments."

In 1800 at the parish church of Kendal, Gough married Mary (died 1858), daughter of Thomas Harrison of Crosthwaite, Cumberland. On their marriage they moved to Middleshaw in the hamlet of Old Hutton. John and Mary Gough had nine children, one of whom, Thomas Gough (1804 – 1880) became a surgeon in Kendal.

In 1812 Gough had a house, which he named Fowl Ing, built for himself and his family on the south-west slope of Benson Knot, a hill 2 miles north-east of Kendal. At about the same time he began to act as a private tutor of mathematics to a select group of pupils from northern England, whom he prepared for university. The subsequent fame of his students superseded his own celebrity. A number of them went on to achieve high distinction in the mathematical tripos, and subsequently in the hierarchies of university and church. One of Gough's first students was William Whewell, who was with him in 1812 and later described Gough as "a very extraordinary person."

From 1823, John Gough had repeated attacks of epilepsy. He died on 28 July 1825, leaving his wife and seven of their children. He was buried in the parish churchyard of Kendal.

== Career ==
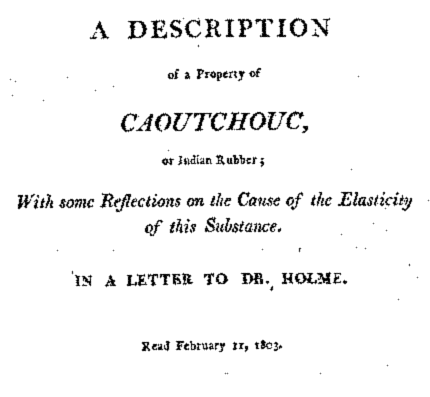
Gough's paper on rubber

Gough had wide-ranging scientific interests. He published papers in natural history, mechanics, mathematics, chemistry, and experimental physics.

One of his most interesting pieces of work was an investigation into the properties of natural rubber or Caoutchouc. He was the first to describe the heat released when a rubber band is quickly stretched, the heat being detected by the lips to which the band is pressed. When stretched rubber is heated, it contracts, a reversal of the normal behaviour of materials when heated. Gough published these results, and others, in a letter to the Manchester Literary and Philosophical Society in 1804. King has written that through Dalton, Gough exerted an indirect influence years later on James Joule, who undertook his own investigations into rubber, elasticity, and energy changes, and specifically referred to Gough's earlier studies. The effect eventually became known as the Gough–Joule effect.

Gough's most substantive enquiry was "An investigation of the method whereby men judge by the ear of the position of sonorous bodies relative to their own persons", which appeared in 1802 during an ongoing controversy with another former Quaker, the noted natural philosopher Thomas Young, over the nature of compound sounds.

Among his works in the natural sciences, he carried out experiments with plants. He had developed the skill of using his upper lip to identify plants by touch, and reported the hydrosere succession as freshwater lakes dry out and become land. He also described seed banks in soils.

== Recognition ==
Kendal Museum holds a bust of Gough, carved in marble by an unknown artist. It bears the title "John Gough / The Blind Philosopher / 1757-1825".

Gough's autobiography, transcribed and annotated by Michael Pearson and Ian D. Hodkinson, was published in 2021 by the Cumberland and Westmorland Antiquarian and Archaeological Society with the title The Dark Path to Knowledge.
