= Burton and Holme railway station =

Disused railway station in Burton-in-Kendal, Cumbria

Burton and Holme
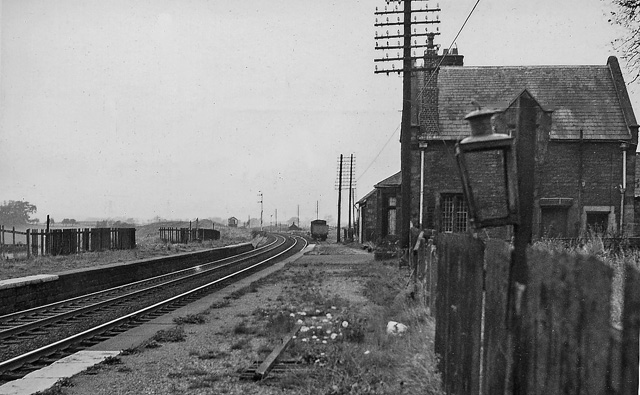
- The station in 1961

General information
- Location: Burton-in-Kendal, Westmorland; England
- Coordinates: 54.1892°N 2.7356°W
- Grid reference: SD521773
- Platforms: 2

Other information
- Status: Disused

History
- Original company: Lancaster and Carlisle Railway
- Pre-grouping: London and North Western Railway
- Post-grouping: London, Midland and Scottish Railway

Key dates
- 22 September 1846: Opened
- 25 March 1950: Closed to passengers
- 28 March 1966: Closed to goods
Location

Burton and Holme railway station served the village of Burton-in-Kendal, Westmorland, England, from 1846 to 1966 on the Lancaster and Carlisle Railway.

== History ==
The station opened on 22 September 1846 by the Lancaster and Carlisle Railway. It closed to passengers on 25 March 1950 and to goods on 28 March 1966.

Preceding station	Historical railways	Following station
Milnthorpe; Line open, station closed	Lancaster and Carlisle Railway	Carnforth; Line and station open
