= Listed buildings in Killington, Cumbria =

Killington is a civil parish in Westmorland and Furness, Cumbria, England. It contains 20 listed buildings that are recorded in the National Heritage List for England. Of these, two are listed at Grade II*, the middle of the three grades, and the others are at Grade II, the lowest grade. The parish contains the village of Killington and the settlement of Hallbeck, and is otherwise completely rural. Most of the listed buildings are houses, farmhouses, and farm buildings, the others being bridges, a church, and a milestone.

== Key ==
Grade	Criteria
II*	Particularly important buildings of more than special interest
II	Buildings of national importance and special interest

== Buildings ==
Name and location	Photograph	Date	Notes	Grade
All Saints' Church; 54.29506°N 2.59576°W		14th century	The church was altered in the 17th century, re-roofed in 1868, and restored in 1895 when the vestry was added. The church is in roughcast stone with ashlar dressings and a slate roof. It consists of a nave and chancel in a single cell, a south vestry and a tower containing a porch. The tower has doorways and bell openings with pointed heads, and a pyramidal roof. Most of the windows in the body of the church are mullioned, and one has three trefoil heads.	II*
Killington Hall; 54.29518°N 2.59608°W		15th century	The house, which was extended in 1640 and again in 1803, is in stone with a slate roof. It has two storeys with attics, and four bays, the first bay consisting of a pele tower in ruins. The doorway in the third bay is remodelled and in Gothick style. To the left is a sash window with a hood mould, to the right is a window with an ogee head and a scrolled pediment, and in the upper floor the windows are mullioned. In the second and third bays are gabled dormers and in the third bay is a datestone. At the right end is a lean-to outshut, and the windows at the rear are of varying types.	II
Barn, High Stangerthwaite Farm; 54.30128°N 2.58167°W	—	Early 17th century (probable)	Originally a house, later converted into a barn, it is in stone with a slate roof, two storeys and four bays. The windows are mullioned, without glazing, there is a plain entrance, a pitching hole, and at the rear is a barn entrance.	II
Greenholme; 54.30700°N 2.59269°W	—	Late 17th century	A roughcast stone house with a slate roof, two storeys, and five bays. At the rear is a gabled wing and outshuts, and there is another outshut on the right return. There is one casement window, and the other windows are sashes.	II
Hallbeck; 54.28988°N 2.58363°W	—	1684	A stone house with a slate roof, two storeys and four bays. On the front is a gabled porch with a moulded surround, moulded imposts and a decorated lintel. Above the doorway is a datestone, and the windows on the front are mullioned. On the northwest side is a lean-to outhouse with a sash window, and at the southwest is a gabled extension with varied windows.	II*
High Hallbeck Cottage; 54.29071°N 2.58477°W	—	Early 18th century (probable)	A stone house, partly roughcast, with a roof partly of slate and partly of stone-slate. There are two storeys and two bays, and at the rear is a gabled wing and an outshut. On the front is a gabled porch and the windows are sashes, and at the rear the windows are of various types.	II
Low Hallbeck; 54.28976°N 2.58346°W	—	Early 18th century	The house was later extended. It is in stone with a roof mainly of slate. There are two storeys, four bays, and a rear gabled wing with a lean-to outshut. On the front is a gabled porch with a segmental arch, a doorway with a moulded surround, and sash windows.	II
House northwest of Beck Side Farm; 54.28640°N 2.58964°W	—	Early to mid 18th century	The house is in stone with through-stones, and the roof is in slate at the front and stone-slate at the rear. There are two storeys, three bays, and a central gabled porch with a decorated lintel. There is one sash window, the other windows are casements, and at the rear is a later outshut.	II
Barn west of Hallbeck; 54.28987°N 2.58393°W	—	18th century (probable)	The barn is in stone with a slate roof and there is an outhouse to the west. The barn contains a barn entrance, cow house entrances, ventilation slits, and inserted doors and windows.	II
Barn southwest of High Hallbeck Cottage; 54.29062°N 2.58492°W	—	18th century (probable)	A stone barn with quoins, a slate roof, and an L-shaped plan. The openings include cow house and barn entrances, square ventilation holes and ventilation slits, a winnowing door, loading doors, and windows. At the south end is a dovecote.	II
Bridge northeast of Low Hallbeck; 54.28987°N 2.58332°W	—	18th century (probable)	The bridge crosses Hall Beck, it is in stone, and consists of a single segmental arch. The bridge has thin voussoirs and plain parapets with dressed coping.	II
Outbuilding northeast of Low Hallbeck; 54.28996°N 2.58320°W	—	18th century	The building is in stone with quoins and it has a roof partly in slate and partly in stone-slate. On the front are two entrances, two inserted windows, and a loading door. On the sides are outbuildings, and at the rear is an outshut. The outshut has two windows, a stable entrance, and steps leading up to a first floor entrance.	II
High Hallbeck; 54.29078°N 2.58465°W	—	Mid to late 18th century (probable)	A stone house, partly roughcast, with a slate roof. There are two storeys with an attic, two bays, and a gabled rear wing. On the front is a gabled porch with a segmental arch, and the windows are sashes.	II
House north of Beck Side Farm; 54.28654°N 2.58931°W		1779	A stone house with quoins and a slate roof. There are two storeys, two bays, and a hood mould above the ground floor windows. In the centre is a gabled porch with a dated lintel, and the windows are casements imitating sashes. At the rear is a stair window.	II
Barn northwest of Beck Side Farm; 54.28629°N 2.58976°W	—	18th or 19th century	The barn is in stone and has a roof partly of slate and partly of stone-slate. It has various entrances, and at the rear is an outshut and a 20th-century open fronted shed. (Note: Street View in April 2009 shows that the barn has been converted for residential use.)	II
Barn north of Beck Side Farm; 54.28683°N 2.58949°W	—	18th or early 19th century	The barn is in stone and has a slate roof and six bays. In the centre are barn doors, and to the right of these the front and rear project including an outshut with quoins. The other openings include cow house entrances, a winnowing door, and ventilation slits.	II
Barn east of Hallbeck; 54.29014°N 2.58203°W	—	18th or early 19th century	A stone barn with a slate roof and outshuts. It contains barn doors, one with a nearly segmental head, and ventilation slits.	II
Milestone; 54.31894°N 2.59139°W	—	Early 19th century (probable)	The milestone was provided for the Sedbergh to Kendal turnpike road, now the A684 road. It consists of a stone on a square base with broaches to the angles, and is inscribed with initials and numbers indicating the distances in miles to Sedbergh and to Kendal.	II
Black Horse; 54.31933°N 2.58457°W		19th century	Originally a public house, later a private house, it is in stone with overhanging eaves and a slate roof. There are two storeys, and three bays. Above the central doorway is a plaque in an architrave depicting in relief a horse above a coronet. There are outshuts on both sides, one with a mounting block.	II
Killington New Bridge; 54.31144°N 2.58184°W		Mid to late 19th century	The bridge carries the B6256 road over the River Lune. It is stone and consists of a single segmental arch. The bridge has voussoirs, piers, and plain parapets that project over the piers.	II

== Notes and references ==
=== Sources ===
- Historic England, "Church of All Saints, Killington (1335928)", National Heritage List for England
- Historic England, "Killington Hall, Killington (1138121)", National Heritage List for England
- Historic England, "Barn approximately 30 metres north-east of High Stangerthwaite Farmhouse, Killington (1335927)", National Heritage List for England
- Historic England, "Greenholme, Killington (1137924)", National Heritage List for England
- Historic England, "Hallbeck, Killington (1086885)", National Heritage List for England
- Historic England, "High Hallbeck Cottage, Killington (1086884)", National Heritage List for England
- Historic England, "Low Hallbeck, Killington (1086886)", National Heritage List for England
- Historic England, "House to north-west of Beck Side Farm, Killington (1252844)", National Heritage List for England
- Historic England, "Barn immediately west of Hallbeck, Killington (1312021)", National Heritage List for England
- Historic England, "Barn to south-west of High Hallbeck Cottage, Killington (1312017)", National Heritage List for England
- Historic England, "Bridge to north-east of Low Hallbeck, Killington (1138039)", National Heritage List for England
- Historic England, "Outbuilding approximately 30 metres to north-east of Low Hallbeck, Killington (1086887)", National Heritage List for England
- Historic England, "High Hallbeck, Killington (1137989)", National Heritage List for England
- Historic England, "House to north of Beck Side Farm, Killington (1086882)", National Heritage List for England
- Historic England, "Barn to north-west of Beck Side Farm, Killington (1262087)", National Heritage List for England
- Historic England, "Barn to north of Beck Side Farm, Killington (1086883)", National Heritage List for England
- Historic England, "Barn approximately 100 metres to east of Hallbeck, Killington (1312033)", National Heritage List for England
- Historic England, "Milestone approximately 130 metres to west of Gillhouse Style, Killington (1137938)", National Heritage List for England
- Historic England, "Black Horse, Killington (1086881)", National Heritage List for England
- Historic England, "Killington New Bridge, Killington (1137973)", National Heritage List for England
- Historic England, Listed Buildings
- Hyde, Matthew; Pevsner, Nikolaus (2010) [1967], Cumbria, The Buildings of England, New Haven and London: Yale University Press, ISBN 978-0-300-12663-1
