= Killington, Cumbria =

Village and civil parish in Cumbria, England

Coordinates: 54.294°N 2.596°W

Killington
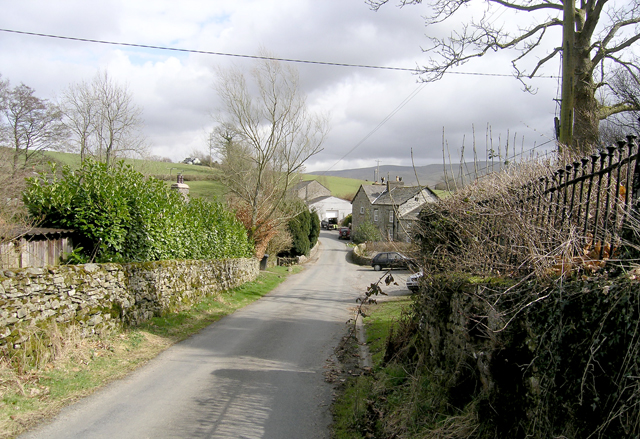
- Killington

- Location in South Lakeland Location within Cumbria
- Population: 261 (2011, including Firbank)
- OS grid reference: SD6188
- Civil parish: Killington
- Unitary authority: Westmorland and Furness
- Ceremonial county: Cumbria
- Region: North West
- Country: England
- Sovereign state: United Kingdom
- Post town: CARNFORTH
- Postcode district: LA6
- Post town: KENDAL
- Postcode district: LA8
- Post town: SEDBERGH
- Postcode district: LA10
- Dialling code: 01539
- Police: Cumbria
- Fire: Cumbria
- Ambulance: North West
- UK Parliament: Westmorland and Lonsdale

Killington is a village and civil parish in the Westmorland and Furness district of the county of Cumbria, England. It had a population of 152 in 2001, At the 2011 census Killington was grouped with Firbank giving a total population of 261.

Killington gives its name to Killington Lake, after which Killington Lake services is named, although this is located in the neighbouring parish of New Hutton.

Killington Hall, in the centre of the village, dates largely from c. 1640, was altered in 1803, and preserves the ruins of a 15th-century pele tower adjoining the main building. The Hall is adjacent to All Saints' Church, which dates from the 14th century, with 17th-century alterations, and was originally built as the chapel to the Hall.

== See also ==
- Listed buildings in Killington, Cumbria
