= Crooklands =

Hamlet in Cumbria, England

Coordinates: 54.2450°N 2.7150°W

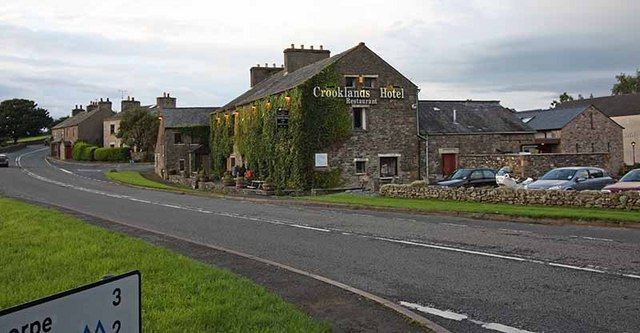
- Crooklands Hotel on the A590 road

- Location in the former South Lakeland district Location within Cumbria
- Population: 2,176 (2011.Ward)
- OS grid reference: SD534835
- Civil parish: Preston Patrick
- Unitary authority: Westmorland and Furness
- Ceremonial county: Cumbria
- Region: North West
- Country: England
- Sovereign state: United Kingdom
- Post town: MILNTHORPE
- Postcode district: LA7
- Dialling code: 015395
- Police: Cumbria
- Fire: Cumbria
- Ambulance: North West
- UK Parliament: Morecambe and Lunesdale

Crooklands is a hamlet in Westmorland and Furness, Cumbria, England, 4.5 miles (7.2 km) south of Kendal on the A65 road and the Lancaster Canal. Historically part of Westmorland, it is in the parish of Preston Richard but adjacent to Preston Patrick to the south east, the boundary roughly following Peasey Beck. The adjacent showfield of the Westmorland County Agricultural Society is the venue of the annual Westmorland County Show (first held 1799, moved to this site late 20th century), Country Fest (since 2009) and various other events.

Crooklands is in the Levens and Crooklands ward which elects one councillor to the unitary authority of Westmorland and Furness. It is in the Morecambe and Lunesdale parliamentary constituency.

Crooklands was previously the name of a ward which elected one councillor to South Lakeland district council. The population of this ward at the 2011 census was 2,146.

In the 1870s Crooklands was described as "a hamlet in Preston-Richard township, Heversham parish". Preston Richard is now a separate parish from Heversham.

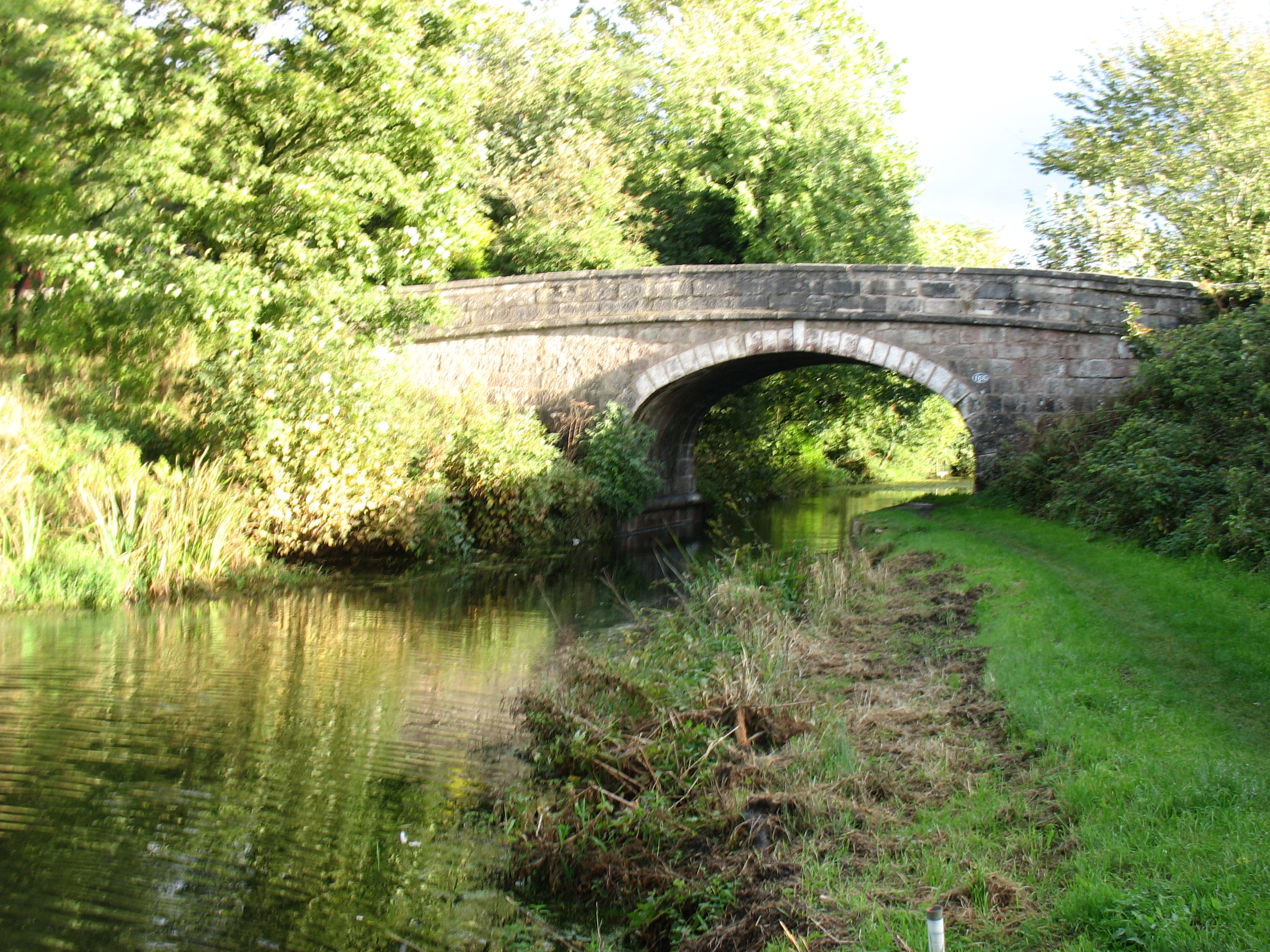
Crooklands Bridge over the canal

Crooklands Bridge, which carries the B6385 Milnthorpe road over the canal, was built c. 1818 and is grade II listed, as is the water mill at Milton, south west of Crooklands, sometimes described as being at Crooklands. The Crooklands Hotel, on the A590, is a mid 18th-century former farmhouse.

Junction 36 of the M6 motorway, to the south east of the hamlet where the motorway connects to the A65 and the A590, is sometimes referred to as Crooklands Interchange.

== See also ==
- Listed buildings in Preston Richard
