= St Patrick's Church, Preston Patrick =

Coordinates: 54.2452°N 2.7119°W

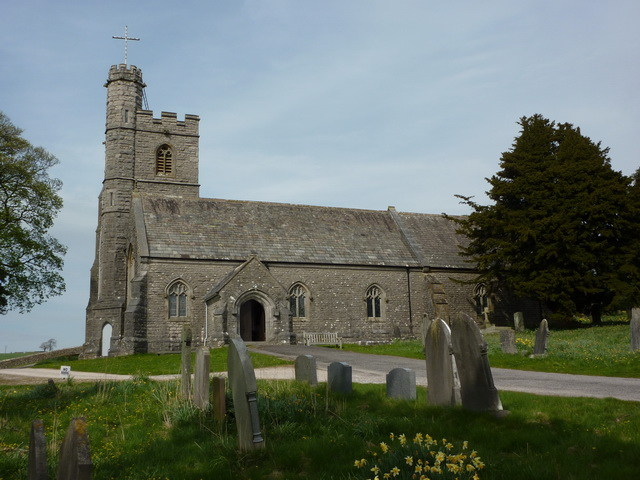
- St Patrick's Church, Preston Patrick from the south

- Location in Cumbria
- OS grid reference: SD 537,835
- Location: Preston Patrick, Cumbria
- Country: England
- Denomination: Anglican
- Website: St Patrick, Preston Patrick

History
- Status: Parish church
- Dedication: Saint Patrick (the church was formerly dedicated to Saint Gregory)

Architecture
- Functional status: Active
- Heritage designation: Grade II
- Designated: 20 September 1985
- Architect(s): Sharpe and Paley; Paley, Austin and Paley
- Architectural type: Church
- Style: Gothic Revival
- Groundbreaking: 1852
- Completed: 1892
- Construction cost: £1,400 (equivalent to £170,000 in 2025)

Administration
- Province: York
- Diocese: Carlisle
- Archdeaconry: Westmorland and Furness
- Deanery: Kendal

St Patrick's Church is the parish church of Preston Patrick, Cumbria, England. It is an active Anglican church, one of eight parish churches served by the Kirkby Lonsdale Team Ministry. It is in the archdeaconry of Westmorland and Furness, and the diocese of Carlisle. The church is recorded in the National Heritage List for England as a designated Grade II listed building.

== History ==
Until the 19th century, this locality was within the large rural parish of Heversham. However, there was a chapel on the site. In 1850 the Lancaster architects Edmund Sharpe and E. G. Paley reported that the chapel appeared, from its architectural design, to have been built during the reign of Henry VII (1457–1509). The architects designed a new church. Building started in 1852 and the new church opened on 28 November of that year. It cost about £1,400 (equivalent to £170,000 in 2025), and had seating for 1,386 people. In 1892 the chancel was rebuilt by Paley, Austin and Paley, the successors of Sharpe and Paley.

== Architecture ==
=== Exterior ===
The church is constructed in limestone with limestone dressings in the nave, and sandstone dressings in the chancel. The roof is of slate, with a stone ridge and copings. Fabric from the earlier church is incorporated in this church consisting of a window in the tower and niches in the chancel. The architectural style is Perpendicular. The plan of the church consists of a west tower, a four-bay nave with a north aisle and a south porch, a single-bay chancel, and a vestry. The tower is square, and in four stages that are separated by a string courses. The top stage contains bell openings in each face, and the tower is surmounted by battlemented parapets. At its southwest corner is a bell turret that rises to a higher level than the tower. In the body of the church, the west and east windows have four lights.

=== Interior ===
Inside the church, the nave is whitewashed, and it contains a north arcade carried on monolithic limestone columns. The chancel is lined with sandstone ashlar. Flanking the east window are two canopied niches. The stained glass in the east window is by Shrigley and Hunt and depicts the Te Deum. There are two war memorials, one by Heaton, Butler and Bayne, the other by Powells. The two-manual pipe organ was made by Wilkinson of Kendal in 1891, and has been modified several times.

=== Gallery ===
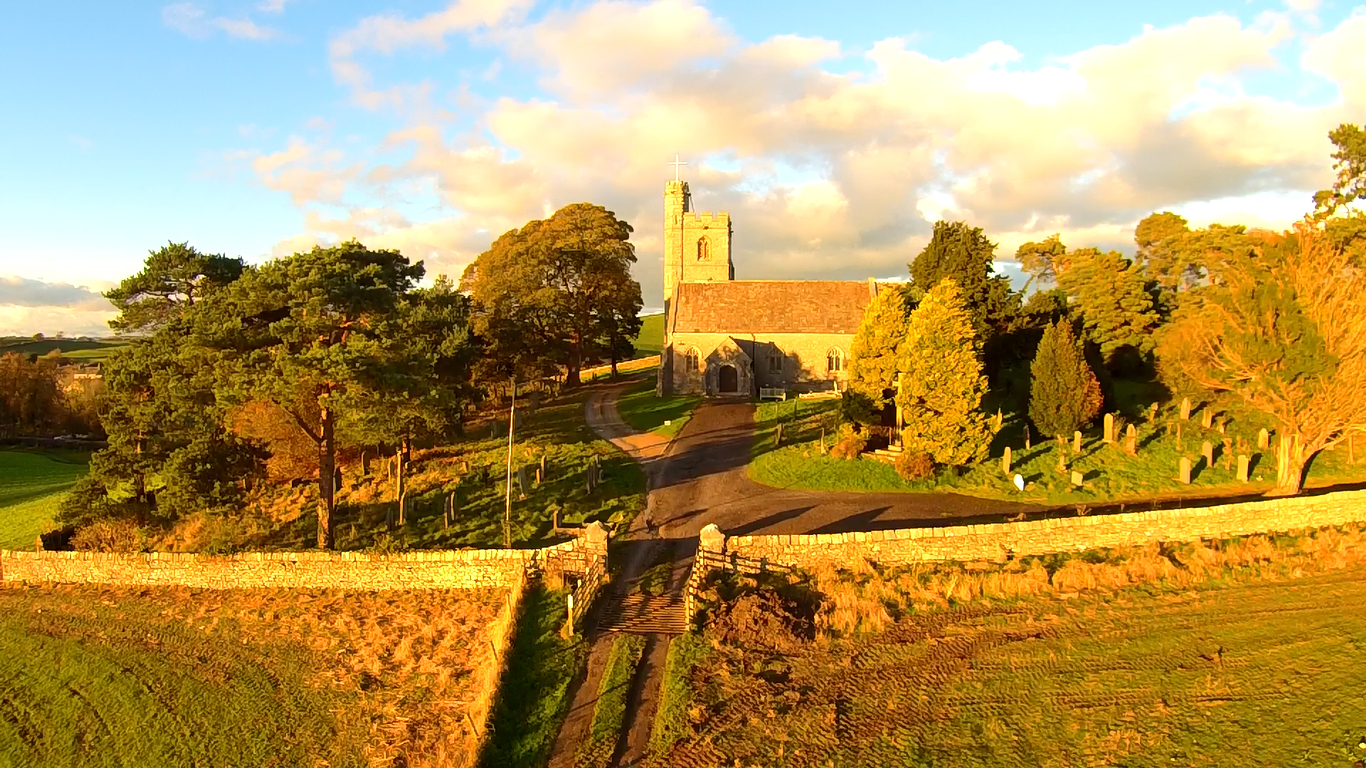
View of site of St Patrick's Church including part of the graveyard & main entrance to the churchyard.

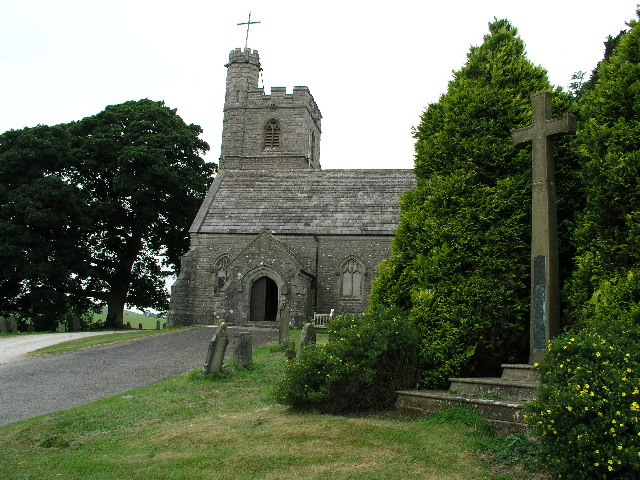
View of west tower and south porch.

== See also ==
- Listed buildings in Preston Patrick
- List of works by Sharpe and Paley
- List of works by Paley, Austin and Paley
