= Endmoor =

Village in Cumbria, England

Coordinates: 54.257°N 2.708°W

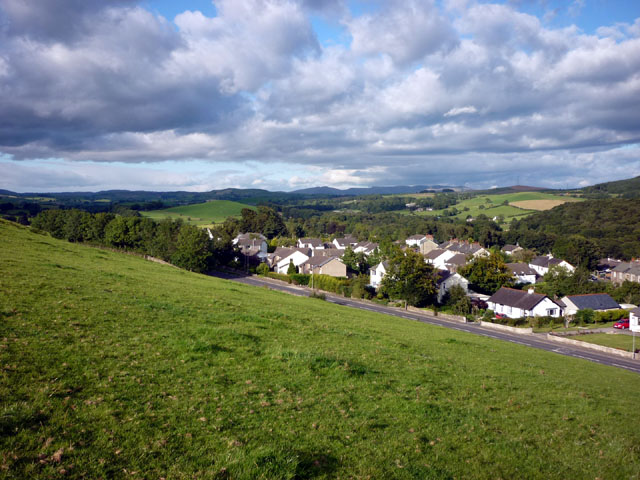
- Endmoor

- Location in South Lakeland Location within Cumbria
- OS grid reference: SD538848
- Civil parish: Preston Richard
- Unitary authority: Westmorland and Furness
- Ceremonial county: Cumbria
- Region: North West
- Country: England
- Sovereign state: United Kingdom
- Post town: KENDAL
- Postcode district: LA8
- Dialling code: 015395
- Police: Cumbria
- Fire: Cumbria
- Ambulance: North West
- UK Parliament: Westmorland and Lonsdale

Endmoor is a small village within Cumbria, England, situated close to the A65 road. It is about 5 miles (8 km) from Kendal, just south of Oxenholme, and is in the parish of Preston Richard.

Endmoor is a community with small businesses including the club inn, village school, village hall and bakery. A millennium clock stands on the green and there is a playground for the children.

== History ==
Endmoor used to be home to a grand manor house called Enyeat. This is now the name of a nearby road and the coach house (1875) is a guest house. In 1991 the new primary school "St.Patrick's C of E School" was built by locals. It is now 'the hub' of the village offering a pre-school, parent and toddler group, parent and child activities and adult / community classes such as Art & IT.

Poet John Keats stayed the night in the village in the summer of 1818 on a walking tour through the Lakes, with the goal of meeting his hero, William Wordsworth. Keats and his walking companion, Charles Brown, walked from Lancaster along the path of the modern A65 before reaching Endmoor. The following morning they walked to Kendal.

The old school, opened in 1862, has been turned into housing. It was replaced by a new school in 1991.

== Local schools ==
Nearby secondary schools include Dallam School in Milnthorpe and Queen Elizabeth School in Kirkby Lonsdale.

== See also ==
- Listed buildings in Preston Richard
