= Westmorland County Agricultural Society =

Coordinates: 54°14′44″N 2°43′45″W

The society's logo

The Westmorland County Agricultural Society (WCAS, established 1799) is a registered charity which supports agriculture and related activities in and around the former county of Westmorland, England. Its activities include the annual Westmorland County Show. It was previously known as the Westmorland and Kendal District Agricultural Society.

The Society's objectives are:

(A) To promote and improve agriculture, horticulture, allied industries, rural crafts, the breeding of livestock, forestry and conservation and in particular in the old county of Westmorland and those parts of adjoining counties which are within a fifty five mile radius of Lane Farm, Crooklands, Milnthorpe, Cumbria; (B) To promote such charitable purposes as the charity trustees of the Society shall think fit.

The Society is based at Crooklands, Milnthorpe, Cumbria, where it has a permanent showground and buildings which are used for conferences and other functions.

== Westmorland County Show ==
The annual county show takes place on the second Thursday of September at the Society's showground and is said to be "one of the largest one day Shows in the Country". It includes competitive classes for heavy and light horses, beef and dairy cattle, sheep, pigs, goats, dogs, alpacas, rural crafts and Cumberland and Westmorland wrestling. There are several hundred trade stands, and over 30,000 people attend each year.

There was a virtual show in 2020, as live shows were cancelled caused by COVID-19 pandemic. The 2021 show is to take place over two days because of COVID-19 precautions.

== Other events at the Society's showground ==
The showground is used for various regular events such as the Society's annual Countryfest and other events such as the Red Rose 2022 international scout and guide camp.

In December 2014 it was announced that Elton John would perform at the showground to an audience of 12,000 on 14 June 2015.
