= Gough–Joule effect =

The Gough–Joule effect (a.k.a. Gow–Joule effect) is originally the tendency of elastomers to contract when heated if they are under tension. Elastomers that are not under tension do not see this effect. The term is also used more generally to refer to the dependence of the temperature of any solid on the mechanical deformation. This effect can be observed in nylon strings of classical guitars, whereby the string contracts as a result of heating. The effect is due to the decrease of entropy when long chain molecules are stretched.

If an elastic band is first stretched and then subjected to heating, it will shrink rather than expand. This effect was first observed by John Gough in 1802, and was investigated further by James Joule in the 1850s, when it then became known as the Gough–Joule effect.

== Examples in literature ==
- Popular Science magazine, January 1972: "A stretched piece of rubber contracts when heated. In doing so, it exerts a measurable increase in its pull. This surprising property of rubber was first observed by James Prescott Joule about a hundred years ago and is known as the Joule effect."
- Rubber as an Engineering Material (book), by Khairi Nagdi: "The Joule effect is a phenomenon of practical importance that must be considered by machine designers. The simplest way of demonstrating this effect is to suspend a weight on a rubber band sufficient to elongate it at least 50%. When the stretched rubber band is warmed up by an infrared lamp, it does not elongate because of thermal expansion, as may be expected, but it retracts and lifts the weight."

The effect is important in O-ring seal design, where the seals can be mounted in a peripherally compressed state in hot applications to prolong life. The effect is also relevant to rotary seals which can bind if the seal shrinks due to overheating.
