= Worshipful Company of Farmers =

Livery company of the City of London

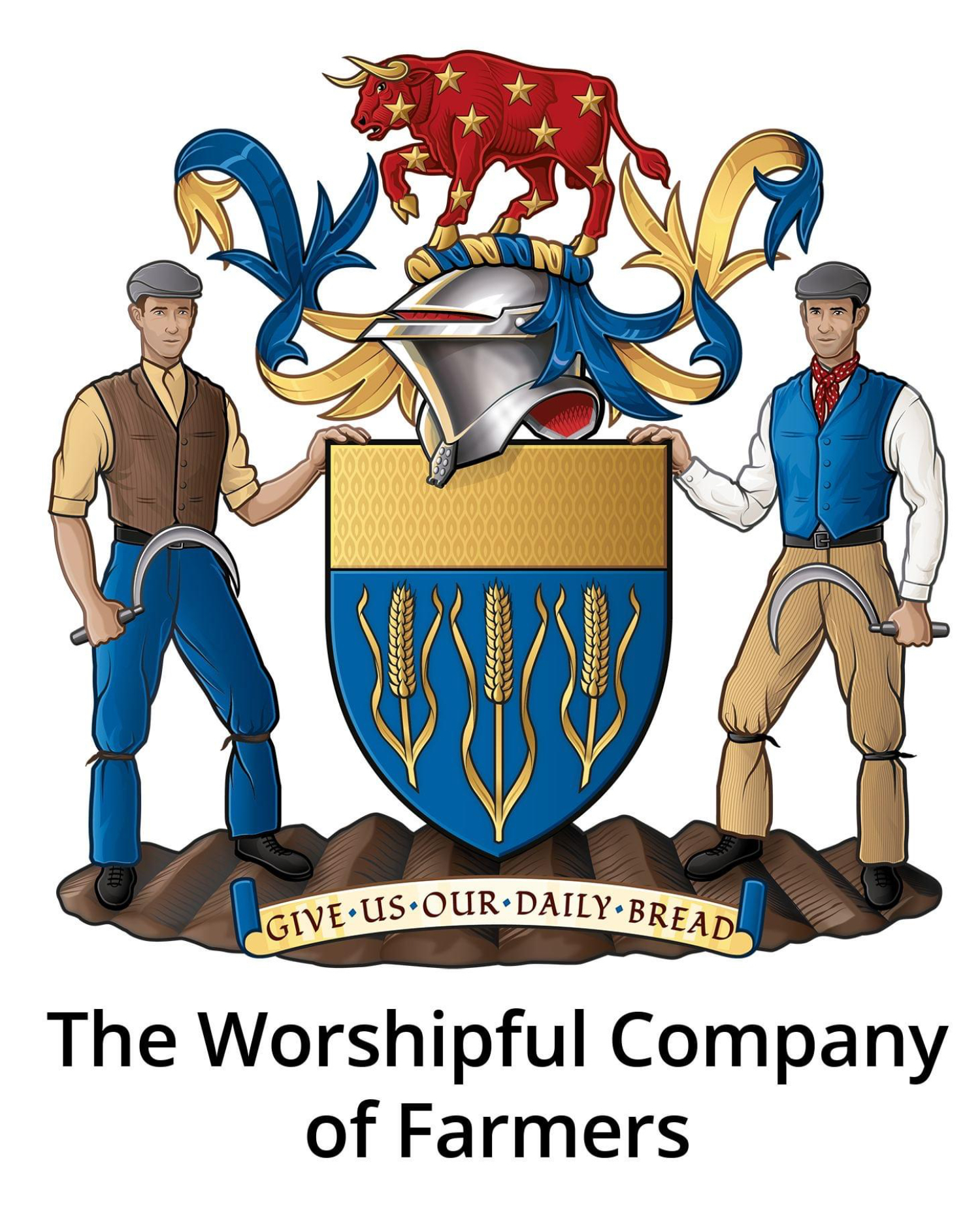
The Coat of Arms of the Farmers' Company

The Worshipful Company of Farmers is one of the Livery Companies of the City of London.

The company became a Livery Company in 1952, with the support of King George VI, and was granted a royal charter three years later by Queen Elizabeth II in 1955. The Farmers' Company supports farming students and promotes education in agriculture.

Anne, Princess Royal was master of the company for 2001–02. King Charles III was conferred as Honorary Liveryman of the Company in 1980.

The Farmers' Company ranks eightieth in the order of precedence for Livery Companies. Its motto is Give Us Our Daily Bread.

== Coat of Arms ==
The College of Arms has granted the Livery Company's coat of arms as per the following blazoning:

Coat of arms of Worshipful Company of Farmers

Granted
6 May 1948
Crest
On a wreath of the colours, A bull passant gules semee of mullets Or, armed and unguled gold.
Escutcheon
Azure, three ears of wheat in fesse slipped and leaved Or; a chief of the last.
Supporters
On either side a farm labourer proper holding in the exterior hand a sickle also proper [the whole upon a compartment of ploughed land, the furrows receding from the foreground, proper].
Motto
Give us our Daily Bread
