= Milnthorpe railway station =

Disused railway station in Milnthorpe, Cumbria

Milnthorpe

General information
- Location: Milnthorpe, Westmorland; England
- Coordinates: 54.2284°N 2.7486°W
- Grid reference: SD512816
- Platforms: 2

Other information
- Status: Disused

History
- Original company: Lancaster and Carlisle Railway
- Pre-grouping: London and North Western Railway
- Post-grouping: London Midland and Scottish Railway

Key dates
- 22 August 1846: Opened
- 1 July 1968: Closed
Location

Milnthorpe railway station served the village of Milnthorpe, in the historical county of Westmorland, England, from 1846 to 1968 on the Lancaster and Carlisle Railway.

== History ==
The station was opened on 22 August 1846 by the Lancaster and Carlisle Railway. It closed on 1 July 1968.

Preceding station	Historical railways	Following station
Oxenholme; Line and station open	Lancaster and Carlisle Railway	Burton and Holme; Line open, station closed
