= Stainton (near Kendal) =

Village in Cumbria, England

Coordinates: 54.2664°N 2.7325°W

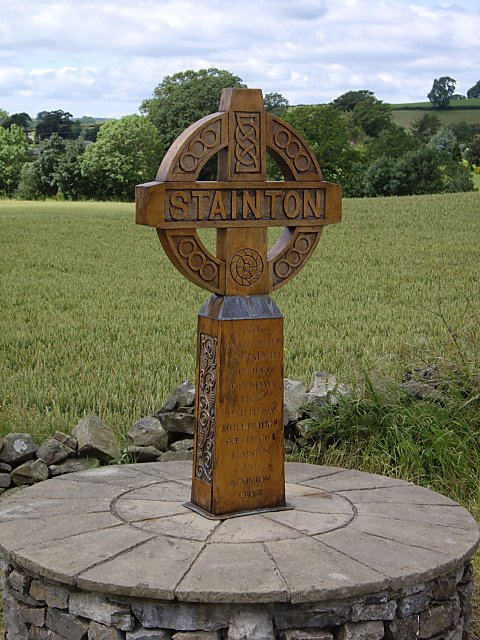
- Stainton cross

- Location within Cumbria
- Population: 316 (2021)
- OS grid reference: SD522859
- Civil parish: Stainton
- Unitary authority: Westmorland and Furness
- Ceremonial county: Cumbria
- Region: North West
- Country: England
- Sovereign state: United Kingdom
- Post town: KENDAL
- Postcode district: LA8
- Dialling code: 015395
- Police: Cumbria
- Fire: Cumbria
- Ambulance: North West
- UK Parliament: Westmorland and Lonsdale

Stainton is a village and civil parish in the Westmorland and Furness district of Cumbria, England. It is near the village of Sedgwick and 5.3 miles (8.5 km) south Kendal. Killington Reservoir runs alongside the parish of Stainton and the village is near the A590 road. In 2021 the parish had a population of 316. From 1974 to 2023 it was in South Lakeland district.

The village is home to a small chapel, post office and 128 houses. The chapel, which was erected in 1698 is no longer used for religious reasons. In 2003 work started to convert it into a village hall and, ten years later, it was handed on 22 November 2013 to the charity that had funded this project.

It is situated south east of the Lake District national park. The Lancaster Canal runs to the south of the village.

== History ==
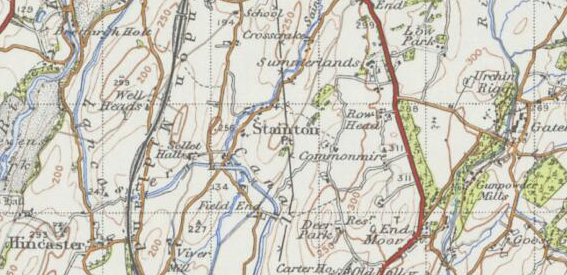
20th century map of Stainton, South Lakeland received from the Vision of Britain Website.

The name Stainton derives from the old English meaning of stoney farm/settlement. Stān, meaning "a stone, stone, rock" and tūn meaning "an enclosure, a farmstead, a village, an estate."

Stainton used to be the site of an old Roman settlement and is built on limestone.

In the 19th century John Bartholomew described Stainton as:

"Stainton, township and vil., Heversham par., Westmorland, in S. of co.- township, 1735 ac., pop. 388; vil., 4 miles S. of Kendal; P.O."

=== Historical monuments ===
Monuments in the parish include a series of bridges across Stainton Beck (Stainton bridge, a packhorse bridge and an aqueduct carrying the Lancaster Canal), Selet Hall and the parish church (St Thomas' Church in the neighbouring village of Crosscrake).

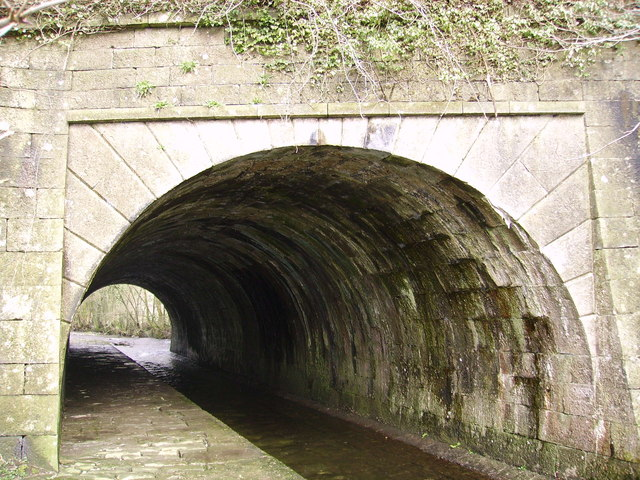
Viaduct Stainton Beck – geograph.org.uk – 142366

Alfred Wainwright wrote about the history stating that "it is a place of great antiquity" and also about how pleasant the parish was.

== Demographics ==
Census population and households of Stainton parish
Census	Population	Households
1871	378	
1881	388	78
1891	405	83
1901	332	81
1911	331	
1921	324	77
1931	276	76
1951	335	92
1961	297	100
1971	249	
2001	301	123
2011	313	128
2021	316	126

=== Occupations ===
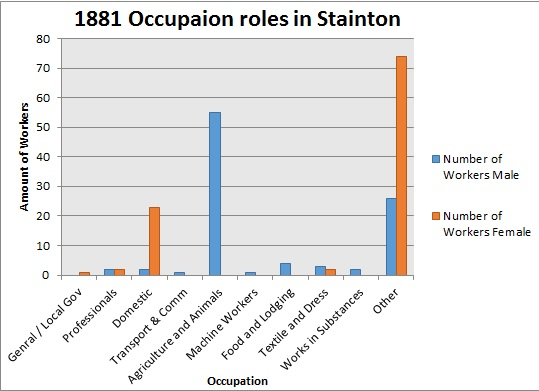
Bar chart showing the occupation statistics of Stainton in 1881

This table shows the occupation roles of the population of Stainton in the year 1881 for males (blue) and females (orange). Other than the unidentified jobs, there was a high proportion of workers in the agricultural and animals sector.

The second largest sector is domestic which is dominated by females at 23, compared to only two males.

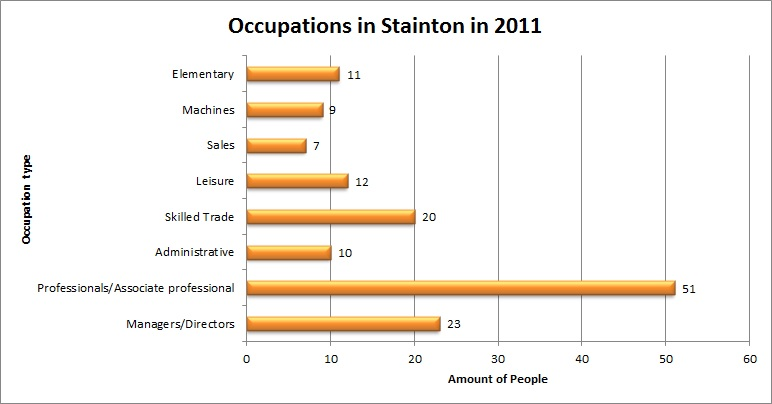
Graph showing the occupation statistics of Stainton in 2011

In the 2011 census the recorded number of economically active people in the parish was 226 and of those, 146 were economically active. With this table it is possible to compare the 1881 occupation statistics with those of 2011. As the 1881 graph shows the most significant occupations other than the unknown ones were agriculture and domestic. The largest sector in 2011 was professionals and associate professionals which compared to only 4 in 1881 is a large expansion. This shows that over 130 years the dominant occupation roles have shifted from agriculture to professionals and also managers and directors.

Of those who were economically inactive, one was unemployed, seven of them are full-time students and 56 were retired.

=== Education ===
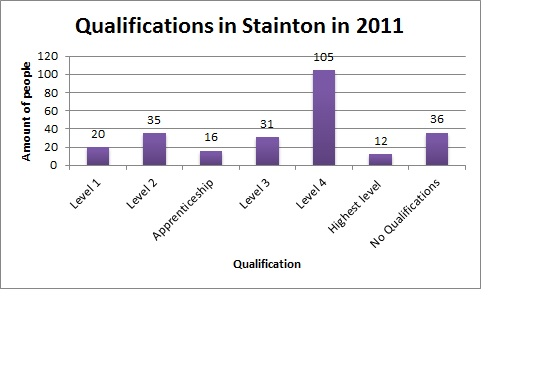
A graph showing the qualifications gained by residents in Stainton using 2011 census data

In the parish of Stainton there are 255 members who are 16 and over. As the Graph shows 219 of these have qualifications between level one and the highest level of qualification including apprenticeships. As the graph shows, 105 people who live in the village have gained a level four qualification which is the greatest percentage at 41.2% of the total number.Out of 255 people, 36 in the parish have no qualifications.

=== Households ===
In 2011, two-person households dominated the parish with 46.75% (56) houses. There were few houses occupied by larger families, with only eight houses having five people or more in them. The majority of the homes were detached or bungalows, followed by semi-detached homes.

== See also ==
- Listed buildings in Stainton (near Kendal)
