= Preston Richard =

Coordinates: 54.2564°N 2.7167°W

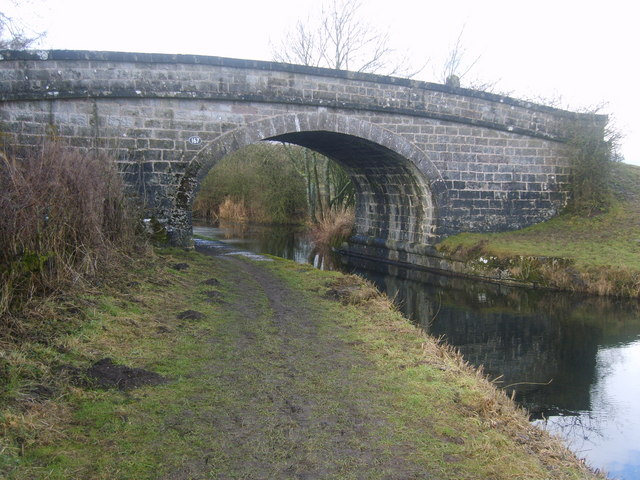
- Bridge over the Lancaster Canal near Crooklands

- Location within Cumbria
- Population: 1,305 (2011 census)
- Civil parish: Preston Richard
- Unitary authority: Westmorland and Furness
- Ceremonial county: Cumbria
- Region: North West
- Country: England
- Sovereign state: United Kingdom
- Police: Cumbria
- Fire: Cumbria
- Ambulance: North West

Preston Richard is a civil parish in Westmorland and Furness, Cumbria, England. It includes the village of Endmoor, and the hamlets of Crooklands, Birkrigg Park, Milton, Low Park, and Summerlands.

In the 2001 census the parish had a population of 1,307, decreasing slightly at the 2011 census to 1,305.

There are 16 grade II listed buildings in the parish, including several milestones, bridges and a privy.

In 1870-1872 it was described as "a township in Heversham parish" with a population of 504 and a gunpowder works. From 1974 to 2023 it was in South Lakeland district.

== See also ==
- Listed buildings in Preston Richard
