= Preston Patrick =

Village and civil parish in Cumbria, England

Coordinates: 54.2450°N 2.6997°W

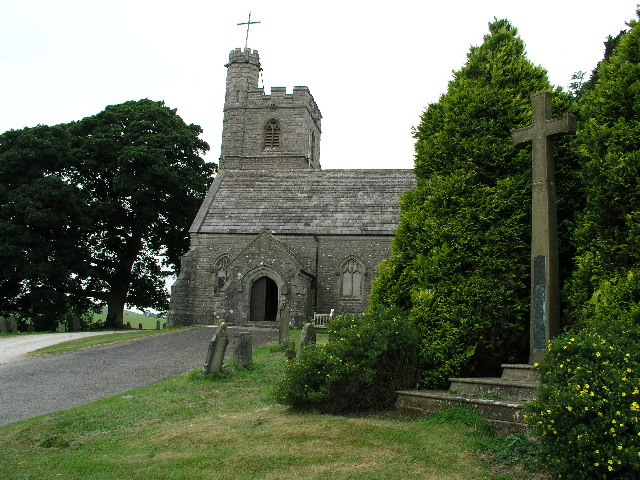
- St Patrick's Church

- Location in former South Lakeland district Location within Cumbria
- Population: 426 (2011 census)
- Civil parish: Preston Patrick
- Unitary authority: Westmorland and Furness
- Ceremonial county: Cumbria
- Region: North West
- Country: England
- Sovereign state: United Kingdom
- Post town: Milnthorpe
- Postcode district: LA7
- UK Parliament: Westmorland and Lonsdale

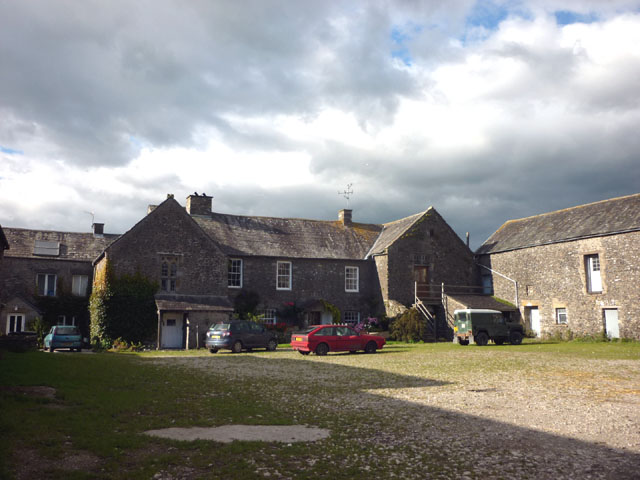
Preston Patrick Hall in 2010

Preston Patrick is a village and civil parish in Westmorland and Furness, Cumbria, England. It has junction 36 of the M6 motorway in its south west corner and extends north east on both sides of the motorway until just beyond the B2564 road. In the 2001 census the parish had a population of 438, decreasing at the 2011 census to 426.

It is set in the drumlin landscape south of Kendal. The neighbouring parishes are Old Hutton and Holmescales to the north, Lupton to the east, Beetham to the south and Preston Richard to the west.

Preston Patrick has a parish council, the lowest tier of local government in England.

== Buildings ==
There are 27 buildings or structures in the parish which are listed. The building with the highest listing is Preston Patrick Hall which is Grade II* listed. It dates probably from the late 14th century, comprising the remains of a medieval tower house altered in the 17th century. It is now a private house. The other listed buildings, which include several milestones, are Grade II.

The former primary school, built in 1775, closed in 1949 and is now an art gallery.

Preston Patrick Memorial Hall, built in the 1920s, is a community hall used for a range of events including meetings of the local Women's Institute.

=== Places of worship ===
There are two places of worship, each built in the 19th century and now listed Grade II.

- St Patrick's Church is one of the churches in the Kirkby Lonsdale team ministry.
- The Friends' Meeting house was built in 1869 on the site of a previous meeting house built in 1691 which had fallen into disrepair after 1833.

== See also ==
- Listed buildings in Preston Patrick
