= Ackenthwaite =

Hamlet in Cumbria, England

Coordinates: 54.229°N 2.759°W

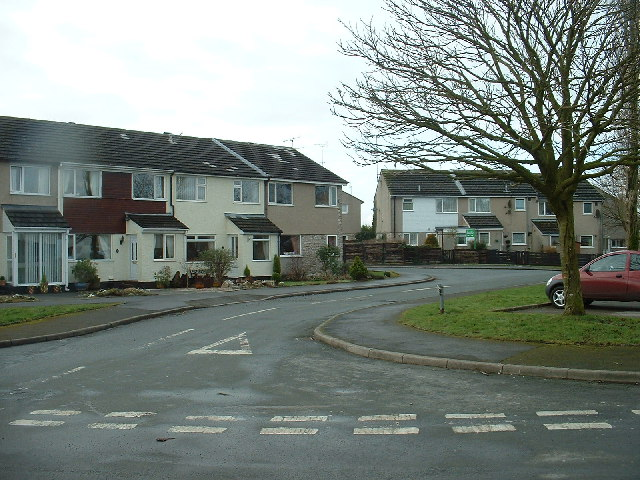
- Houses in Ackenthwaite

- Location in the former South Lakeland district Location within Cumbria
- OS grid reference: SD505817
- Civil parish: Milnthorpe
- Unitary authority: Westmorland and Furness
- Ceremonial county: Cumbria
- Region: North West
- Country: England
- Sovereign state: United Kingdom
- Post town: MILNTHORPE
- Postcode district: LA7
- Dialling code: 015395
- Police: Cumbria
- Fire: Cumbria
- Ambulance: North West
- UK Parliament: Westmorland and Lonsdale

Ackenthwaite is a hamlet in Cumbria, England. In the past (14th century) the spelling for the name of this place was Astenthwhate.

Ackenthwaite has a postbox, a telephone box, a few farms, a small farmers' pub called the Plough Inn and a few old buildings including the "old workhouse" which was, in fact, a workhouse, then a mental institution, and then a storage warehouse. Later it was converted into flats and now stands as 5 houses. Built up around the old workhouse is the estate of Owlet Ash.

Ackenthwaite was the location for Libby's which is an old factory for Nestle. There is now a small industrial estate on the site.

== History ==
The first signs of settlement in Ackenthwaite are from the early 14th century, but there's a small church called St Cuthberts that dates to the 12th century. It was also owned privately by an unknown person until in 1873 it was bought by Westmorland County Council.
