= New Hutton =

Village and civil parish in Cumbria, England

Coordinates: 54°18′53″N 02°40′26″W

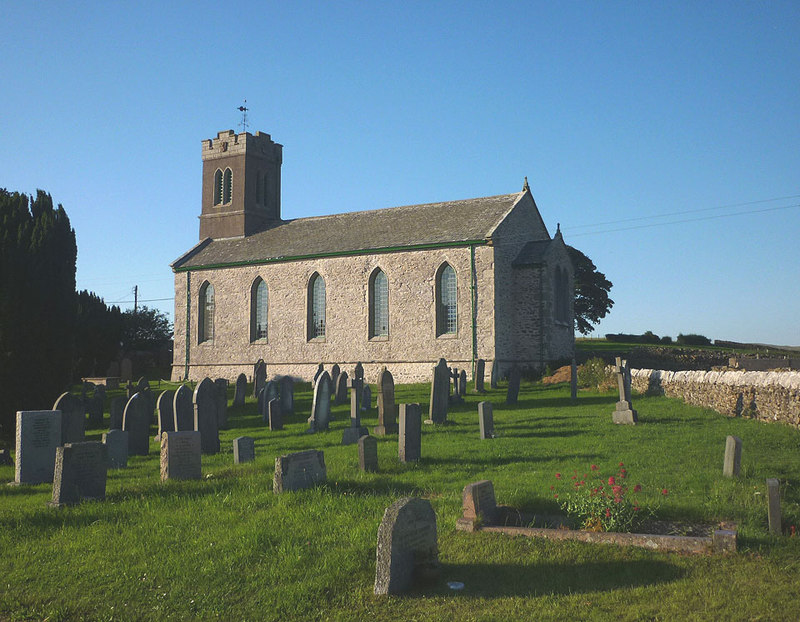
The church of St Stephen

New Hutton is a village and civil parish in Westmorland and Furness, Cumbria, England. At the 2011 Census, it had a population of 348.

New Hutton is east of Kendal, and north of Old Hutton. The M6 motorway runs through the eastern edge of the parish, and the A684 road across it east–west.

The village is south of the A684. The church of St Stephen is in the centre of the village.

There is a parish council, the lowest tier of local government.

== Listed buildings ==
The parish contains 12 listed buildings, all at grade II, including the church.
