= Old Hutton =

Village in Westmorland, England

Coordinates: 54°17′30″N 2°40′46″W

- Village
- Location within the United Kingdom
- Country: England
- Sovereign state: United Kingdom

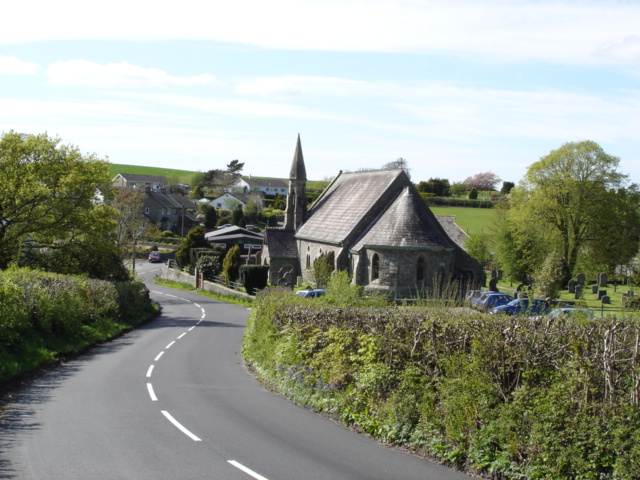
Church of St John the Baptist, Old Hutton, in 2005, with primary school beyond

Old Hutton is a village in Westmorland and Furness, Cumbria, England. It is in the civil parish of Old Hutton and Holmescales, which is adjacent to the parish of New Hutton. In the 2001 census the parish had a population of 357, increasing at the 2011 census to 417.

The parish church, dedicated to St John the Baptist, is in the Kendal Deanery of the Diocese of Carlisle.

== See also ==
- Listed buildings in Old Hutton and Holmescales
- New Hutton
