= Far Arnside =

Hamlet in Cumbria, England

Coordinates: 54.180°N 2.844°W

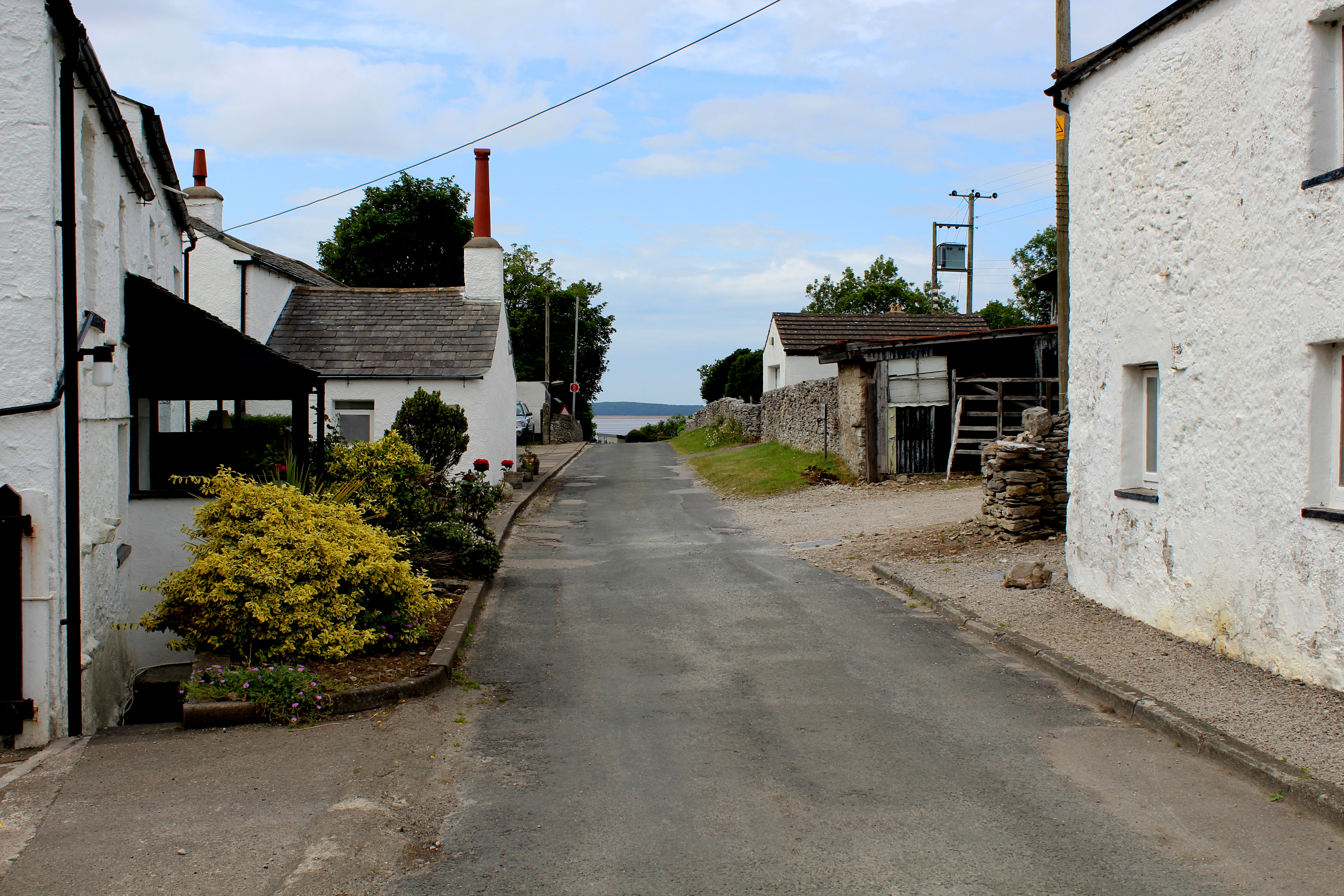
- Far Arnside

- Location in South Lakeland Location within Cumbria
- OS grid reference: SD449763
- Civil parish: Arnside
- Unitary authority: Westmorland and Furness
- Ceremonial county: Cumbria
- Region: North West
- Country: England
- Sovereign state: United Kingdom
- Post town: CARNFORTH
- Postcode district: LA5
- Dialling code: 01524
- Police: Cumbria
- Fire: Cumbria
- Ambulance: North West
- UK Parliament: Westmorland and Lonsdale

Far Arnside is a hamlet in Arnside civil parish in the Westmorland and Furness district, Cumbria, England.

== Location ==
It is located near the large villages of Arnside and Silverdale. It is about half a mile north of the Cumbria/Lancashire boundary.

== Nearby places of interest ==
Nearby places of interest include Arnside Knott, Arnside Tower (a Peel tower) and Eaves Wood. Far Arnside is in the Arnside and Silverdale Area of Outstanding Natural Beauty. It has a caravan park called Far Arnside Caravan Park.

The Leeds Children's Charity's holiday centre was in Far Arnside, though more closely associated with Silverdale; it closed in 2016.
