= David Hey =

English historian (1938–2016)

David G. Hey (18 July 1938 – 14 February 2016) was an English historian, and was an authority on surnames and the local history of Yorkshire. Hey was the president of the British Association for Local History, and was a published author of several books on local history and the derivation of surnames.

== Early life ==
Hey was born to George and Florence (née Batty) Hey in Catshaw. He had two younger siblings, Ernest and Barbara. When he was eleven years old the family moved to Penistone, where he attended Penistone Grammar School. He graduated from the University College of North Staffordshire in 1960.

== Career ==
He taught at Matlock College of Education. During this teaching stint, he received a master's degree and doctorate from Leicester University, finishing his studies in 1971. Hey's doctoral adviser was W. G. Hoskins. Four years later, he left a research fellowship at Leicester to join the faculty of Sheffield University. In 1992 he became a chair professor and, in 1994, the dean of extramural studies. Hey was president of the British Association for Local History and the British Agricultural History Society, and led the British Record Society as council chair.

Hey's interest in local history led to books on the town of Penistone and city of Sheffield, and also the counties of Yorkshire and Derbyshire. His research into surnames, which grew from local history, determined that many rare names originated in the 13th century, and that most people with such surnames still lived close to the area from where their surname came. Linking genetic studies with surname prevalence indicated that people did not move as much as social scientists thought at the time. On 12 April 2014, Hey delivered a Marc Fitch Lecture on "The Origins and Spread of Derbyshire Surnames."

== Personal life ==
Hey married Pat Wilkinson in 1970 and had two children, Jonathan and Emma. He died on 14 February 2016 from a brain tumor at the age of 77.

== Selected publications ==
- 1996: The Oxford Companion to Local and Family History. Oxford University Press. ISBN 978-0-19-104493-9 (as editor)
- 1997 (published online 2003): iew/10.1093/acref/9780198600800.001.0001/acref-9780198600800 The Oxford Dictionary of Local and Family History ISBN 9780198600800
- 1998: A History of Sheffield. Carnegie Publishing. ISBN 9781859360453
- 2002: A History of Penistone and District. Wharncliffe Books. ISBN 978-1903425213
- 2003: Journeys in Family History: Exploring Your Past, Finding Your Ancestors, PRO Publications. ISBN 978-1903365618
- 2005: A History of Yorkshire. Carnegie Publishing. ISBN 9781859361221
- 2008: Derbyshire: a History. Carnegie Publishing. ISBN 978-1859361672
