= Pamela Marshall =

Pamela Marshall may refer to:

- Pam Marshall (born 1960), American athlete
- Pamela J. Marshall (born 1954), American horn player and composer
- Pamela Marshall (archaeologist), British archaeologist and historian specialising in the study of castles
