= Association of Genealogists & Researchers in Archives =

Professional association for genealogists and archivists in England and Wales

The Association of Genealogists and Researchers in Archives, (AGRA) is a leading professional organisation representing qualified and experienced independent professional genealogists and historical researchers in England and Wales. AGRA is also prominent as a representative voice in matters relating to genealogy.

History

Originally known as the Association of Genealogists and Record Agents, AGRA was founded in 1968 after several years of planning by a group of six well known genealogists including Anthony J Camp who was then the Director of Research at the Society of Genealogists (SoG), Malcolm Pinhorn, a Chairman of the SoG, and Terrick V.H. Fitzhugh, an author and founder of the Amateur Historian journal, (now the Local Historian published by the British Association for Local History). They were concerned that professional genealogy was an unregulated profession and the standard of work produced by genealogists who offered a paid research service varied considerably.[i]

AGRA was created with the aim of establishing, maintaining and promoting high professional standards in the field of genealogy and historical research. It was established as an unincorporated not for profit association and the founding officers were elected to a council to oversee administration and ensure the progressive and smooth running of the organisation. The inaugural meeting was held on 24 June 1968 at Stationers’ Hall, the home of the Worshipful Company of Stationers and Newspaper Makers in London with 20 invited genealogists. The first AGM was held a year later on 19 July 1969 and by then the membership had increased to 37 members, comprising a mixture of genealogists and record agents. [ii]

Initially members were recruited by invitation only but later membership was opened up to anyone able to demonstrate appropriate professional experience. A sample of their work was required along with three referees who could vouch for the applicant’s ability and integrity before they could be considered for membership. In 1972, a stringent Code of Practice was introduced which all members undertook to comply with. [iii]

Associate membership (known initially as Affiliate membership) was introduced in 1992 to provide guidance and support for those not yet ready for full membership. [iv]In 2001, the name of the Association was changed to the Association of Genealogists and Researchers in Archives to reflect the fact that the number of members working as record agents had declined, while there had been an increase of those specialising in a variety of genealogical related areas, including military, naval and British India research, palaeography and Latin transcriptions. [v]

As the number of members grew, biannual Study Days for the membership were introduced in 2009 and Network Groups were subsequently established to provide an opportunity for Members and Associates to meet to discuss topical issues, exchange ideas, and provide support and mentoring. By 2026 total membership totalled 200.

In 2018, AGRA was the recipient of the Julian Bickersteth Memorial Medal, a prestigious award made by the Institute of Heraldic and Genealogical Studies (IHGS) in recognition of notable and exemplary contributions to family history studies. [vi]It was presented to AGRA’s Chair at a formal dinner held at Parliament Chamber, Inner Temple to celebrate AGRA's 50^{th} anniversary as the professional body for genealogy. [vii]

Scope

As a professional association, AGRA does not as a body undertake research itself but represents its membership of professional genealogists and researchers in archives.

There are two categories of AGRA membership, AGRA Members and AGRA Associates. AGRA Members are very experienced professional genealogists who have demonstrated to AGRA’s Board of Assessors through a process of accreditation that they have a high level of competence in carrying out paid research. AGRA Associates have less experience but have demonstrated a sound knowledge of fundamental genealogical sources, and an awareness of the issues involved in carrying out paid research. The Associate category provides the opportunity for relative newcomers to the profession to benefit from being part of AGRA while building up a portfolio of paid research to enable them to progress towards membership. Associates are expected to progress to full membership within five years. An annual bursary was introduced in 2021, in memory of deceased Associate Dr John Burt, which is payable to an AGRA Associate towards the expenses of furthering their own genealogical education.[viii]

The majority of AGRA’s members hold a relevant qualification from one or more of the main genealogical course providers for those researching ancestors in England and Wales – the Institute of Heraldic and Genealogical Studies Pharos Tutors and the University of Strathclyde. There are reduced requirements for AGRA applicants who hold recognised qualifications from these course providers. [ix]Many members also undertake courses with the SoG. AGRA is partnered with all four organisations.

A new membership category of International Affiliate has recently been introduced for those professional genealogists who carry out research in English and Welsh records but who are based in another country and are existing members of a recognised professional association or organisation in their home country.

AGRA is also a member of the Family History Federation (FHF) and many AGRA members are approved speakers with the FHF. [x] [xi]

AGRA’s current President is Patric Dickinson LVO, a former English officer of arms who served as Claranceux King of Arms at the College of Arms. [xii]

Members can be nominated for Fellowship of AGRA in recognition of their services to the Association and/or to genealogy. [xiii]

AGRA runs weekend conferences every few years which are open to the public as well as the AGRA membership. [xiv] It attends commercial conferences and family history fairs and regularly provides members to run “Ask the Experts” sessions at such events. It also provides free one-to-one Ask the Expert sessions at The London Archives once a quarter. [xv]

AGRA is also prominent as a representative voice in matters relating to genealogy, making representations to official bodies on matters affecting the study and practice of family history and associated topics. In 2023-24, AGRA took a prominent role in the campaign against the Ministry of Justice’s proposal to destroy post-1858 original wills following digitisation. The proposal was subsequently dropped. [xvi] [xvii] Full details on how to join AGRA as either a Member or Associate can be found on the AGRA website : https://www.agra.org.uk/join

[i] Genealogists Magazine 16 (1969), p.116.

[ii] https://anthonyjcamp.com/pages/early-days-of-agra

[iii] https://anthonyjcamp.com/pages/early-days-of-agra

[iv] https://sog.org.uk/guides-and-stories/employing-a-professional-genealogist/

[v] AGRA AGM 2001 minutes (extract)

[vi] https://www.ihgs.ac.uk/about-julian-bickersteth

[vii] https://www.agra.org.uk/news-celebrating-50th-birthday-in-style-2018-05-12

[viii] https://www.agra.org.uk/news-dr-john-burt-bursary-2021-10-13

[ix] https://www.agra.org.uk/join-education

[x] https://www.familyhistoryfederation.com/societies-association-of-genealogists-researchers-in-archives

[xi] https://www.familyhistoryfederation.com/find-a-speaker

[xii] https://www.college-of-arms.gov.uk/news-grants/newsletter/item/188-may-2021-newsletter-no-64

[xiii] https://www.agra.org.uk/attachments/1556026246.pdf

[xiv] https://geneva.weald.org.uk/doku.php

[xv] https://www.thelondonarchives.org/whats-on/ask-the-experts

[xvi] https://www.agra.org.uk/news-consultation-on-storage-of-original-wills-2024-01-03

[xvii] https://www.whodoyouthinkyouaremagazine.com/news/ministry-justice-destroy-wills
