= Terrick V. H. FitzHugh =

- Born: Terrick Victor Henry FitzHugh; 27 March 1907; Much Marcle, Herefordshire, United Kingdom of Great Britain and Ireland
- Died: 20 November 1990 (aged 83); Surrey, United Kingdom
- Occupations: Film producer; genealogist
- Known for: Founder of The Amateur Historian (present-day, The Local Historian) journal.
- Spouse: Mary Pleasant FitzHugh {née Ormiston) (m. 1937)
- Children: 3
- Awards: Julian Bickersteth Memorial Medal, 1989

Terrick V. H. FitzHugh (1907 – 1990) was a British film producer and genealogist, known for founding The Amateur Historian (present-day, The Local Historian) journal.

== Early life and education ==
Terrick Victor Henry FitzHugh was born on 27 March 1907 in Much Marcle, Herefordshire. His mother, Alice Varvara Georgina FitzHugh (née Renny; 1872–1955), was born in Riga, Governorate of Livonia (present-day, Latvia) to a British father and a German mother. His father, The Revd Victor Christian Albert FitzHugh (1881–1954), was the Canon of Ripon Cathedral and later Rector of Wensley.

FitzHugh had two younger siblings, Renny and Eileen. FitzHugh was educated at Dulwich College.

== Career ==
FitzHugh spent most of his career producing scientific and technical documentary films and films for children through the Children's Film Foundation (CFF). In the late 1940s he was one of the directors of Mining Review, a newsreel for the British mining industry. In 1948 he was listed as production manager for Paul Rotha's companies Rotha Films and Films of Fact in The Kinematograph Year Book and in 1954 he was listed as chairman and general manager of the Documentary Technicians Alliance (DATA). He was associate producer on the CFF's Mystery in the Mine (1959) and Four Winds Island (1961), both with Frank A. Hoare as producer.

His first love, however, was genealogy. He joined the Society of Genealogists in 1943 and in 1952 founded the journal The Amateur Historian, now known as The Local Historian and published by the British Association for Local History, and was its first editor. He became a professional genealogist after his retirement and was one of the founders of the Association of Genealogists and Record Agents. He was made a fellow of the Society of Genealogists in 1988. In 1989 he received the Julian Bickersteth Memorial Medal for innovative services to local history and genealogy.

He spent forty years researching his own family history which was privately published after his death and traced his family back to 1223. The endeavor produced the material for his book How to write a family history: The lives and times of our ancestors (1988) which was published in a posthumous new edition with the additional authorship of Henry A. FitzHugh in 2005. He also wrote The dictionary of genealogy which was published in three editions up to 1991.

== Personal life and death ==
In 1937, FitzHugh married Mary Pleasant FitzHugh (née Ormiston; 1914-2005). The couple had two sons and a daughter.

FitzHugh died on 20 November 1990 in Surrey.

== Selected publications ==
- The India Office records as a biographical source. 1981. (Offprint from Family History, October 1981, pp. 41–51.)
- The dictionary of genealogy. Alphabooks/A & C Black, Sherbourne, 1985. (2nd revised edition 1986, revised edition 1988, 3rd edition 1991)
- How to write a family history: The lives and times of our ancestors. Alphabooks, Sherbourne, 1988. ISBN 0713630787
- The history of the Fitzhugh Family: In two volumes. Henry A. Fitzhugh, Ottershaw, 1999. (With Henry A. Fitzhugh) (revised electronic editions 2007 and 2009)
- Fitzhugh: The story of a family through six centuries. Ottershaw, 2001. (Limited to 25 copies)
- How to write your family history. Marston House, Yeovil, 2005. (With Henry A. FitzHugh) ISBN 189929628X
