= Arnside =

Village and civil parish in Cumbria, England

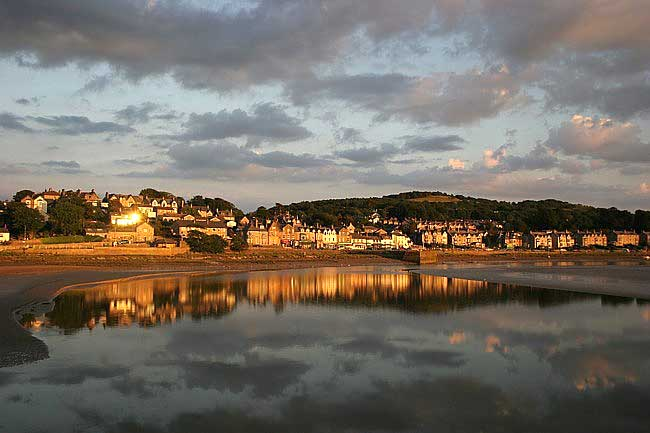
- Arnside on the River Kent

- Location in the former South Lakeland district Location on Morecambe Bay Location within Cumbria
- Population: 2,334 (2011)
- OS grid reference: SD4578
- Civil parish: Arnside
- Unitary authority: Westmorland and Furness
- Ceremonial county: Cumbria
- Region: North West
- Country: England
- Sovereign state: United Kingdom
- Post town: CARNFORTH
- Postcode district: LA5
- Dialling code: 01524
- Police: Cumbria
- Fire: Cumbria
- Ambulance: North West
- UK Parliament: Morecambe and Lunesdale

Arnside is a village and civil parish in Westmorland and Furness, Cumbria, England. It is historically part of Westmorland, near the border with Lancashire, England. The Lake District National Park is located a few miles north. Travelling by road, Arnside is 10 miles (16 km) to the south of Kendal, 25.3 miles (40.7 km) to the east of Ulverston, 35.2 miles (56.6 km) to the east of Barrow-in-Furness, 13 miles (21 km) to the north of Lancaster and 14.3 miles (23.0 km) to the east of Grange-over-Sands. In the 2001 census the parish had a population of 2,301, increasing at the 2011 census to 2,334 but falling to 2,233 in the 2021 census.

It faces the estuary of the River Kent on the northeastern corner of Morecambe Bay, within the Arnside and Silverdale Area of Outstanding Natural Beauty and is overlooked by Arnside Knott, a hill that rises out of the estuary. A detailed account of the wildlife of the Arnside and Silverdale AONB is provided by John Wilson and Peter Lennon. Mammals include red squirrel and otter, breeding birds at the time of publication included the bittern which is still found in the area.

Formerly a small fishing village and port trading with Liverpool and Ireland the village has been attractive to visitors since the 19th century but never developed as a traditional seaside resort. Writing in The Local Historian, Caunce describes it as "an unwitting pioneer of eco-tourism", with visitors attracted by the scenery and in particular Arnside Knott.

== Buildings ==
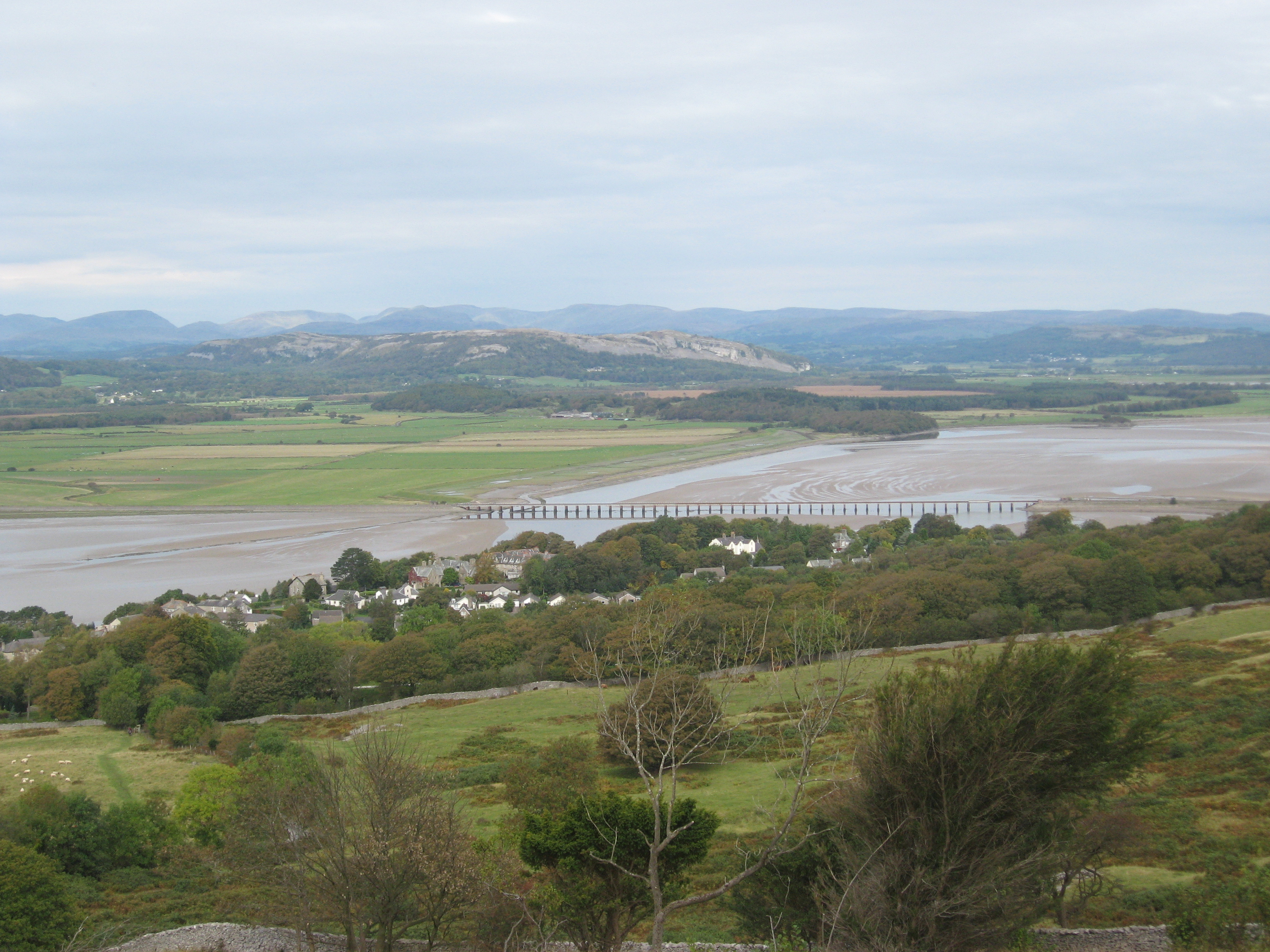
View of the Kent Estuary from Arnside Knott

The oldest building in the parish is Arnside Tower, a Peel tower built in the 14th/15th century as a refuge against raids from Scots and the Border Reivers.

The now defunct Arnside Golf Club was founded in 1906 and closed during World War II.

The former customs house from the port of Arnside is now occupied by the Sailing Club, and many of the buildings on the promenade were built as accommodation for visitors.

=== Arnside viaduct ===
The railway line is carried over the River Kent on a viaduct 552 yards (505 m) long, it was built in 1857 and rebuilt in 1915.

== Governance ==
Arnside is part of the Morecambe and Lunesdale parliamentary constituency, for which Lizzi Collinge has been the MP since 2024, representing the Labour Party.

For local government purposes, it is administered as part of the Westmorland and Furness unitary authority.

The civil parish of Arnside includes the hamlet of Far Arnside as well as the village of Arnside. The parish is bordered by the Kent estuary to the north, Morecambe Bay to the west, Silverdale to the south (along the historic Westmorland / Lancashire county boundary), and Beetham to the east ( the eastern boundary following the railway at its north and south, and extending a little further east). The parish has its own parish council, Arnside Parish Council.

== Transport ==
Arnside has its own railway station, Arnside railway station, which lies on the Furness line giving connections to Lancaster, Barrow-in-Furness, Ulverston, Grange-over-Sands, Carnforth and Carlisle. The Furness Line passes over the River Kent via the Arnside Viaduct.

== Tides ==
This video size: 360x240 500 kbit/s
Alternative size: 720x480 2000 kbit/s

With each high tide, the coast of Arnside is subjected to a very fast rising tide. Because of the potential danger warning notices are posted at the pier, and an audible warning is sounded before every high tide (in daylight). The sequence of warnings is:-

1. Eight sounds on the siren - around 2.25 h before high tide
2. Eight sounds on the siren - around 1.75 h before high tide
3. Twelve sounds on the siren - around 1.25 h before high tide, when the incoming tide is just visible from the Coastguard station (location of the siren 54.199°N 2.841°W )

The cause of this fast tide is a combination of the large area of Morecambe Bay, which narrows rapidly at Arnside, plus the second highest tidal range (at Barrow-in-Furness), which can be as much as 32 feet (9.8 m) on a spring tide nearest the spring and autumn equinox: these typically give rise to a tidal bore, which may be as high as 12 inches (30 cm), and is often used by canoeists.

== Notable people ==
- Helen Blackler (1902–1981), psychologist, botanical collector and museum curator
- Robert Wilson (1922-1980), first-class cricketer and Royal Air Force officer
- Bob Braithwaite (1925 – 2015) trap shooter, gold medallist at the 1968 Summer Olympics
- Barbara Rosemary Grant (born 1936), evolutionary biologist at Princeton University.

== See also ==
- Listed buildings in Arnside
- St James' Church, Arnside

== Image gallery ==
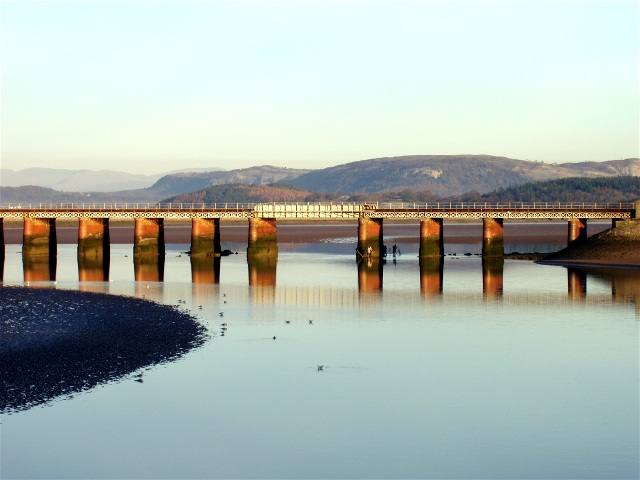
Railway viaduct over the Kent estuary near Arnside
