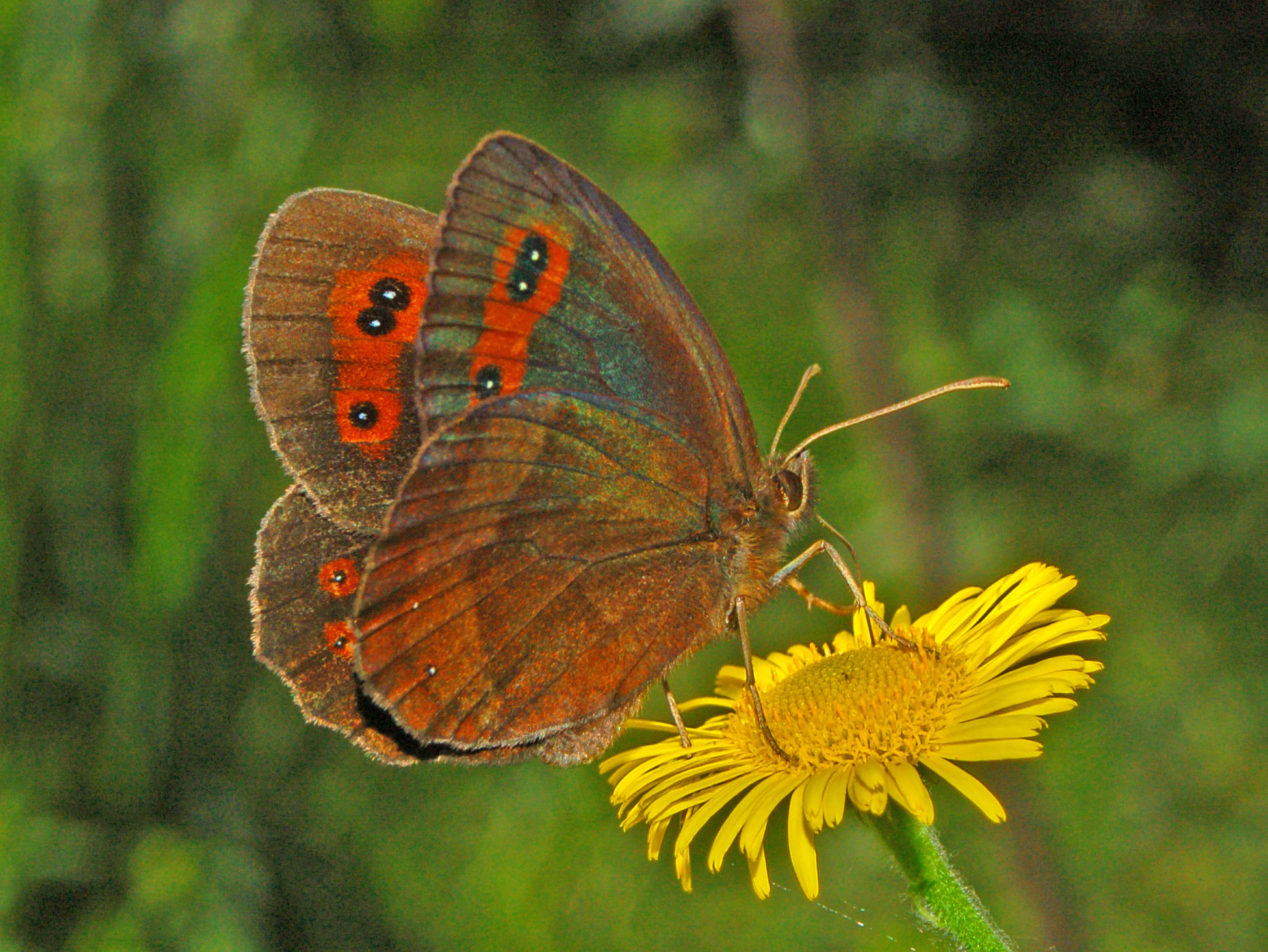
- Underside

Scientific classification
- Kingdom: Animalia
- Phylum: Arthropoda
- Clade: Pancrustacea
- Class: Insecta
- Order: Lepidoptera
- Family: Nymphalidae
- Genus: Erebia
- Species: E. aethiops

Binomial name
- Erebia aethiops (Esper, 1777)

Synonyms
- List: Papilio ocellatus Goeze, 1779; Papilio blandina Fabricius, 1787; Erebia medusa Borkhausen, 1788; Papilio medea Hubner, 1799-1800; Erebia alcyone Stewart, 1817; Erebia neoridas Freyer, 1833; Erebia flavescens Tutt, 1896; Erebia obsoleta Tutt, 1896; Erebia ochracea Tutt, 1896; Erebia freyeri Oberthur, 1909; Erebia fritschi Oberthur, 1909; Erebia cosinida Fruhstorfer, 1917; Erebia depupillata Steiner, 1918; Erebia magna Rocci, 1923; Erebia biocellata Hartig, 1924; Erebia reducta Hartig, 1924; Erebia albofasciata Osthelder, 1925; Erebia perfumosa Dannehl, 1925; Erebia purpurea Sibille, 1927; Erebia infasciata Warren, 1936; Erebia pupillifer a Kolar, 1938; Erebia amplevittata Holtz, 1939; Erebia inocellata Owen, 1952; Erebia binotata Popescu-Gorj, 1955; Erebia demarginata Popescu-Gorj, 1955; Erebia enucleata Popescu-Gorj, 1955; Erebia mesorubria Popescu-Gorj, 1955; Erebia jigodini Popescu-Gorj, 1955; Erebia magdalena Krzywicki, 1963

= Scotch argus =

- Male

Species of butterfly

The Scotch argus (Erebia aethiops) is a butterfly of the family Nymphalidae. In spite of its English name argus, it is not a close relation of the brown argus nor the northern brown argus.

== Taxonomy ==
Subspecies include:

- Erebia aethiops ssp. aethiops (Esper, 1777) (Europe)
- Erebia aethiops ssp. caledonia (Verity, 1911 (Scotland)
- Erebia aethiops ssp. deprezzivaga Verity, 1935
- Erebia aethiops ssp. fogarasica Warren, 1931
- Erebia aethiops ssp. isouata Goltz, 1939 (Shansi)

== Distribution and habitat ==
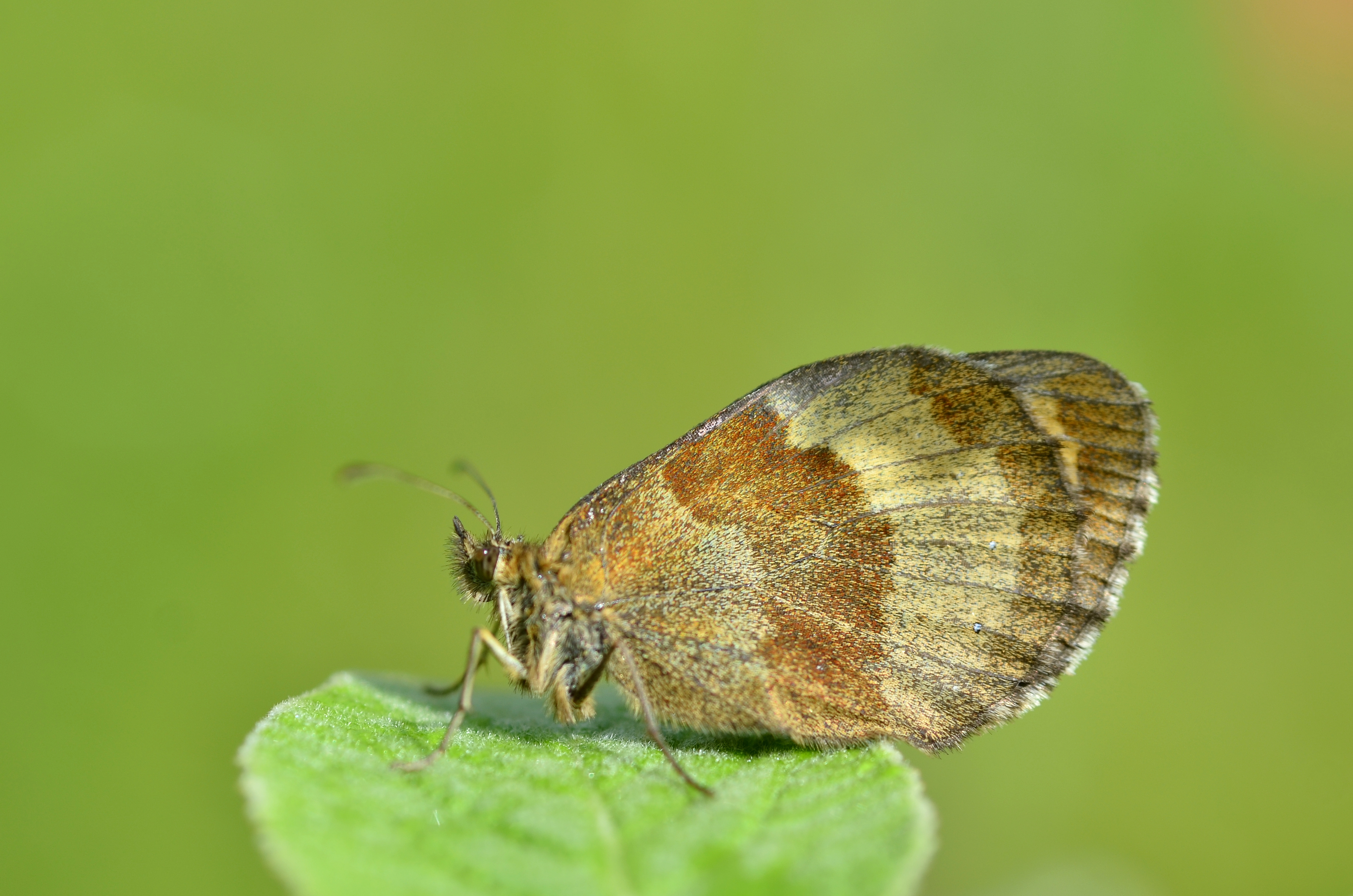
Female, underside

Erebia aethiops is widespread in the Palearctic realm, including most of Europe, the Alps and Apennines, Balkans, Asia Minor, the Urals, and the Caucasus. English colonies are found at Arnside Knott and Smardale Gill both in Cumbria. This species is found in most of northern Scotland, and in western areas in south Scotland. In Europe and Russia, these butterflies prefer the edge of pine forests and tall damp grassland in hills and mountains up to 2400 m.

== Description ==
Erebia aethiops has a wingspan of 42–46 mm. Antennae are clavate (club shaped). The background colour of the wings varies from dark brown to black brown, with reddish-yellow bands, black eyespots with white pupils and greyish wing fringes, weakly chequered in the females. On the forewing there are three or four eyespots, usually two apical plus a third detached, while on the hindwings there are four or five.

The underside of the hindwings shows a whitish or cream banding but there is a slightly marked sexual dimorphism. In Scotland, the subspecies caledonia has a narrower reddish-yellow band and never contains more than three small eyespots. Three black spots are present on each hindwing. The egg is oval shaped, with 20 to 28 longitudinal ribs. The mature caterpillar is yellow brown, with a brown head. The pupae are yellow brown and relatively short and compact, reaching a length of 12.5–124.5 millimetres (0.49–4.90 in).

This species is rather similar to Erebia ligea, but the fringes on the edges of the upper side of the wings are more light grey, while in E. ligea they are white.Wheeler (1903) gives a short description of both species.

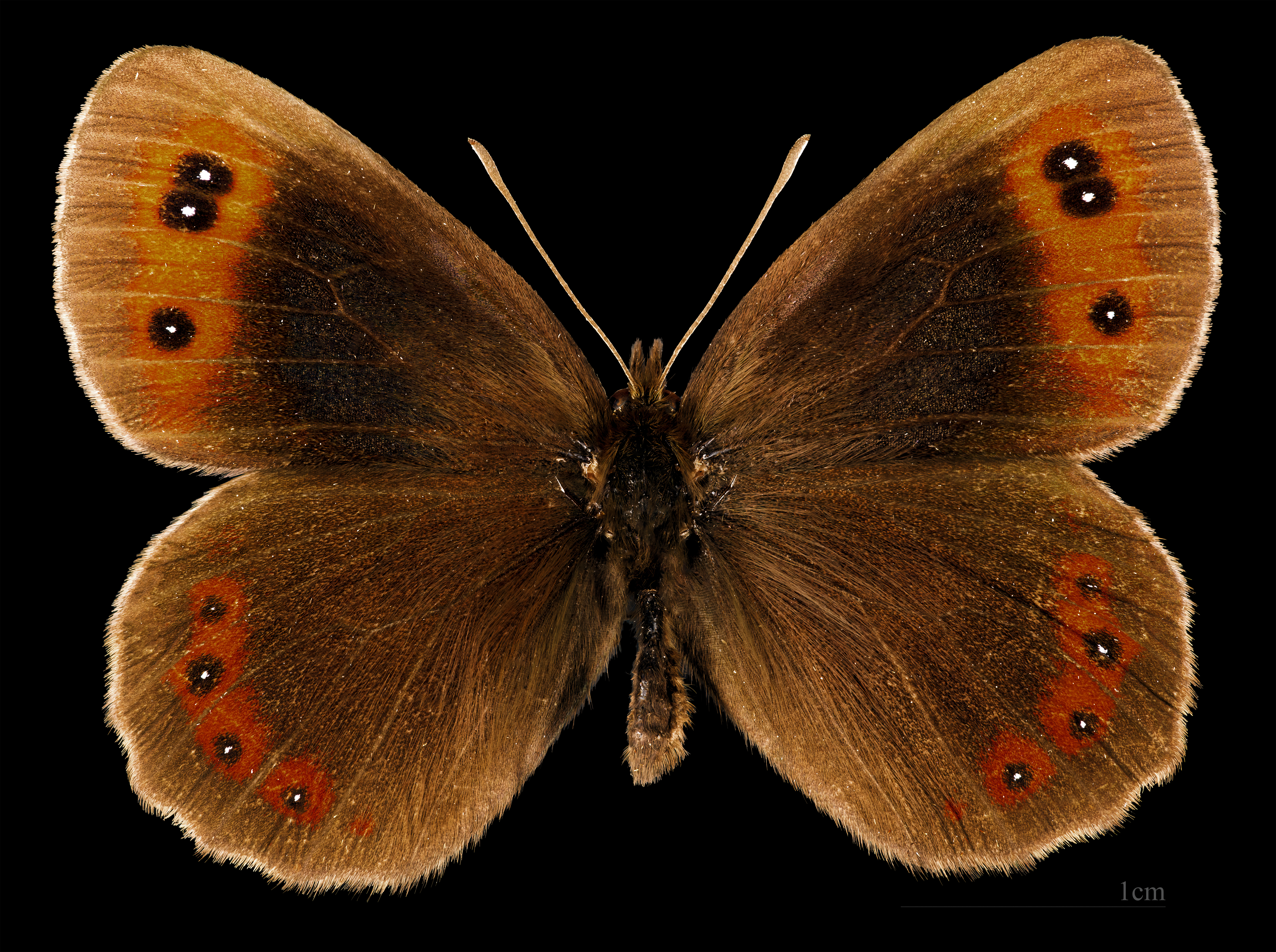
Erebia aethiops ♂

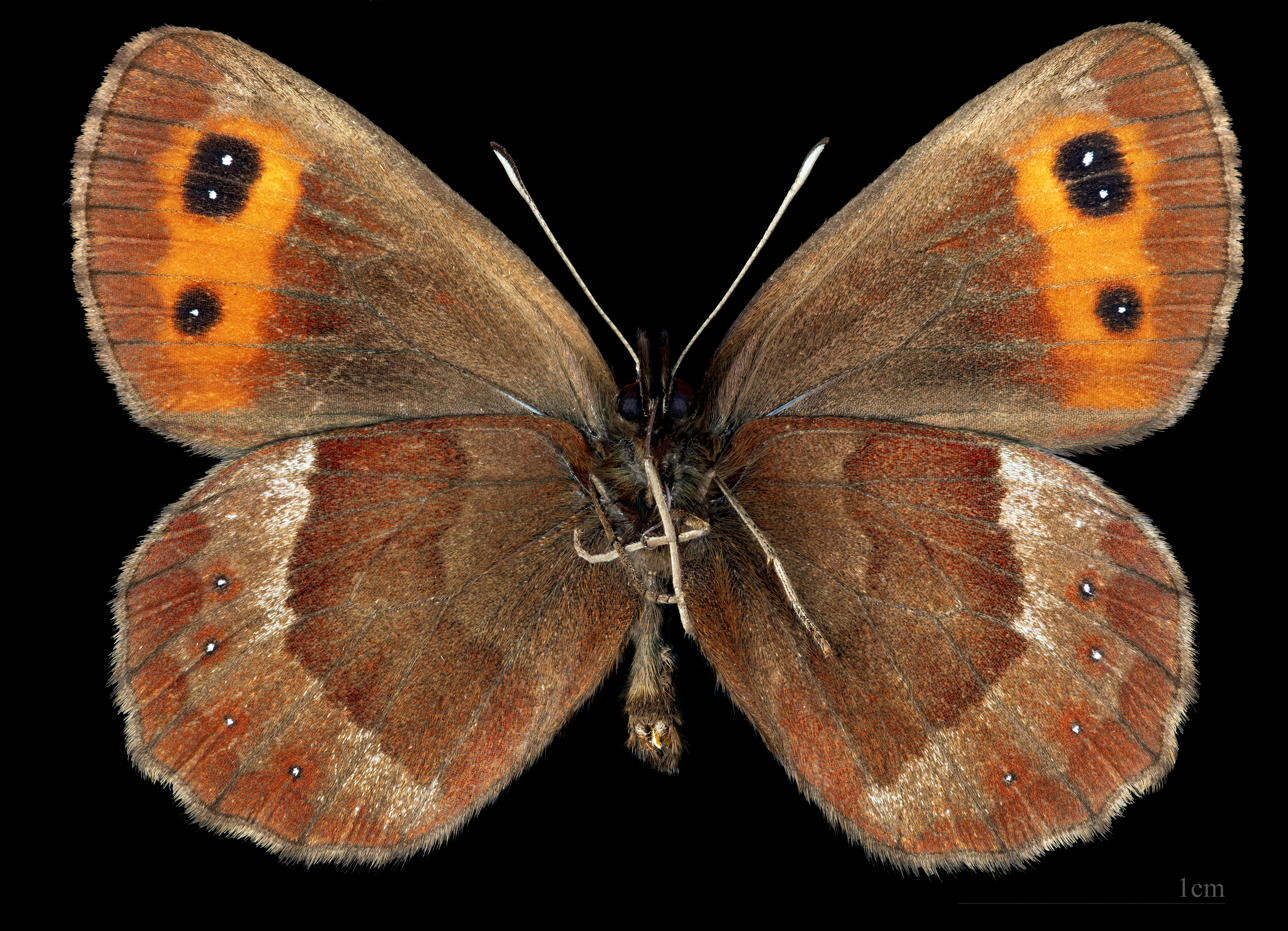
Erebia aethiops ♂ △

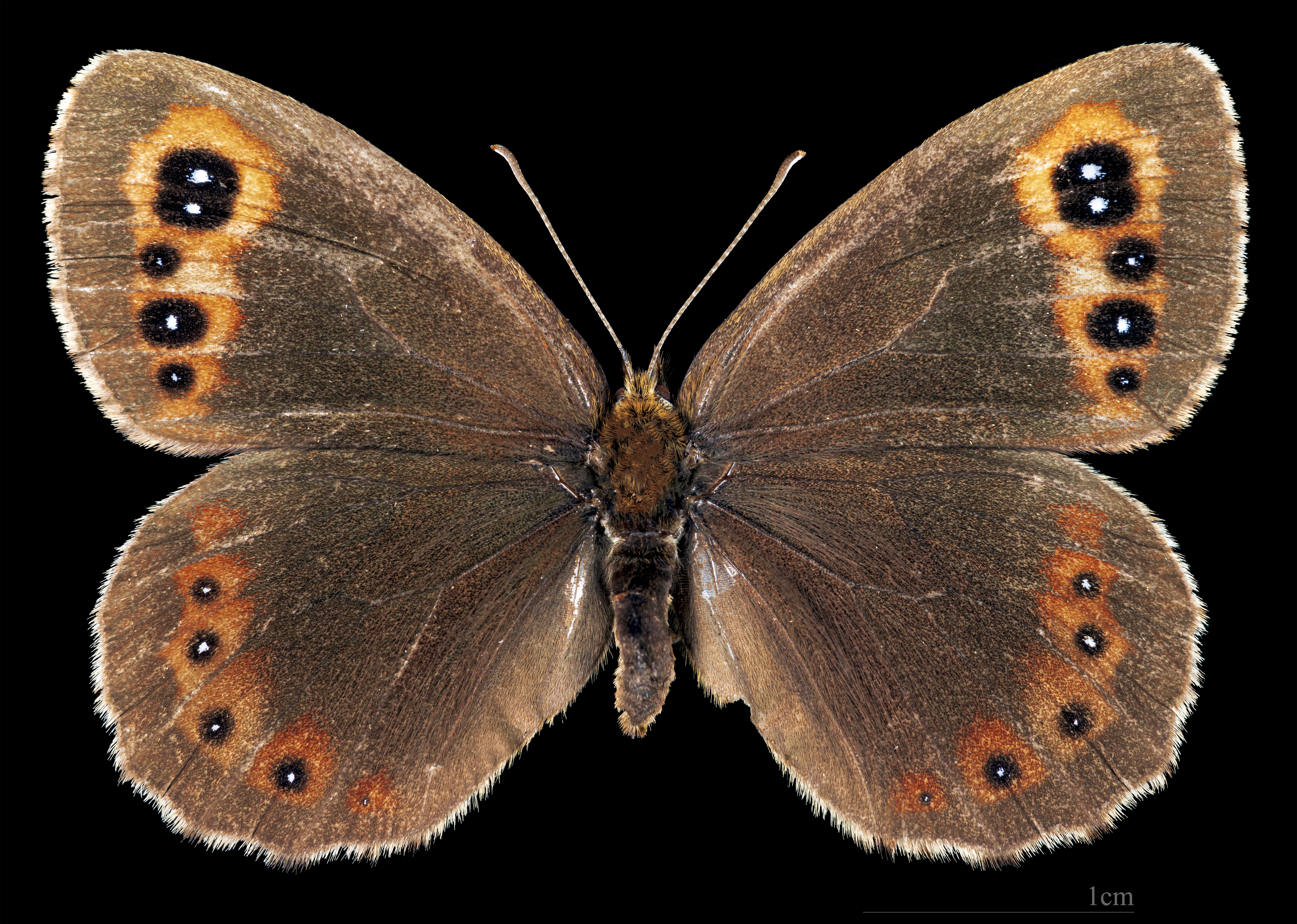
Erebia aethiops ♀

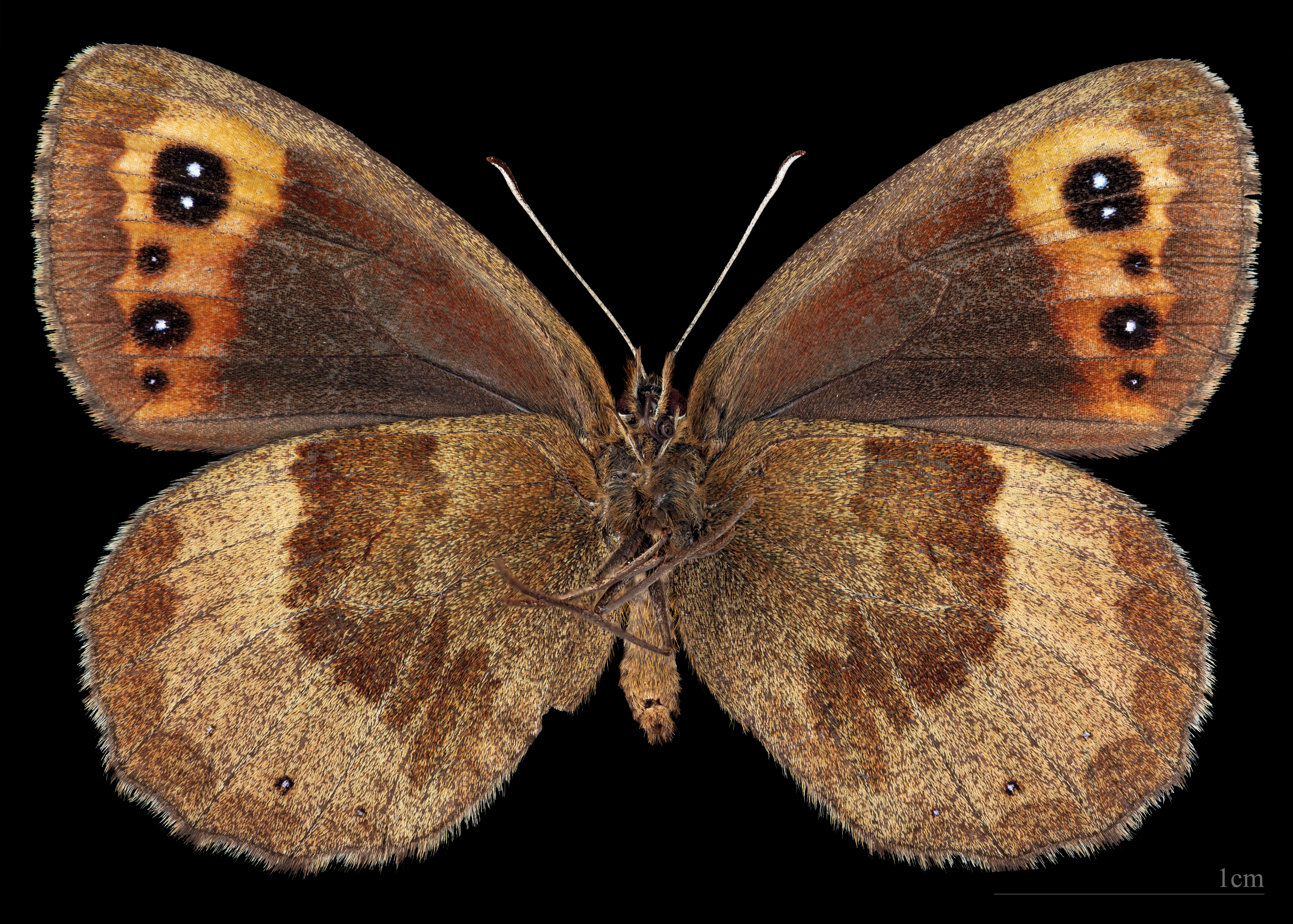
Erebia aethiops ♀ △

== Biology ==
This species is univoltine. Adults fly from June to August. The eggs are laid singly on the leaves of grass. The larvae hatch after two weeks. The hibernating larva is reported to feed on Agrostis, Dactylis, Poa annua, Bromus erectus and other grasses. In Scotland the main host plants are purple moor-grass (Molinia caerulea) and blue moor-grass (Sesleria caerulea).

== Gallery ==
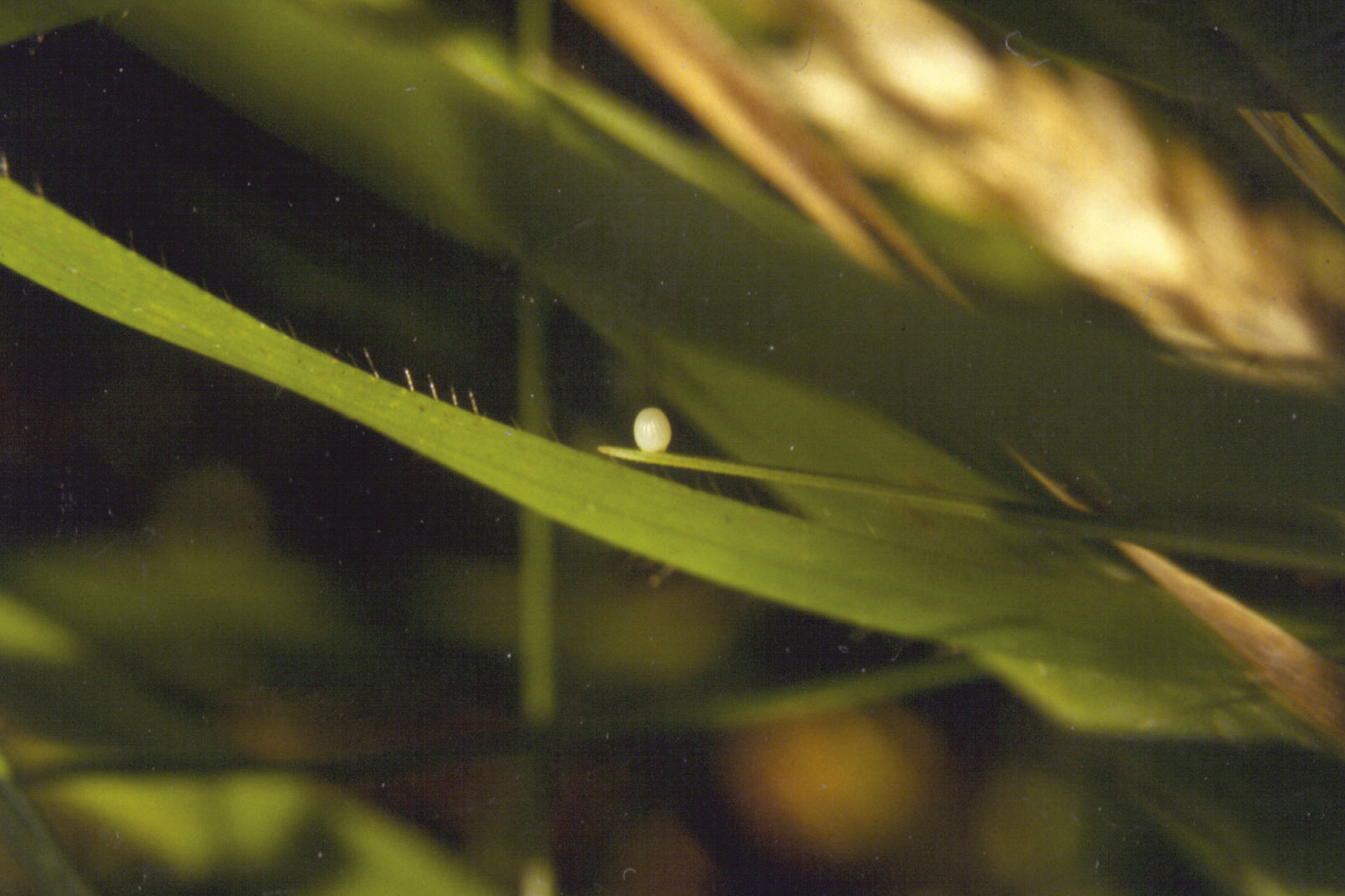
Egg

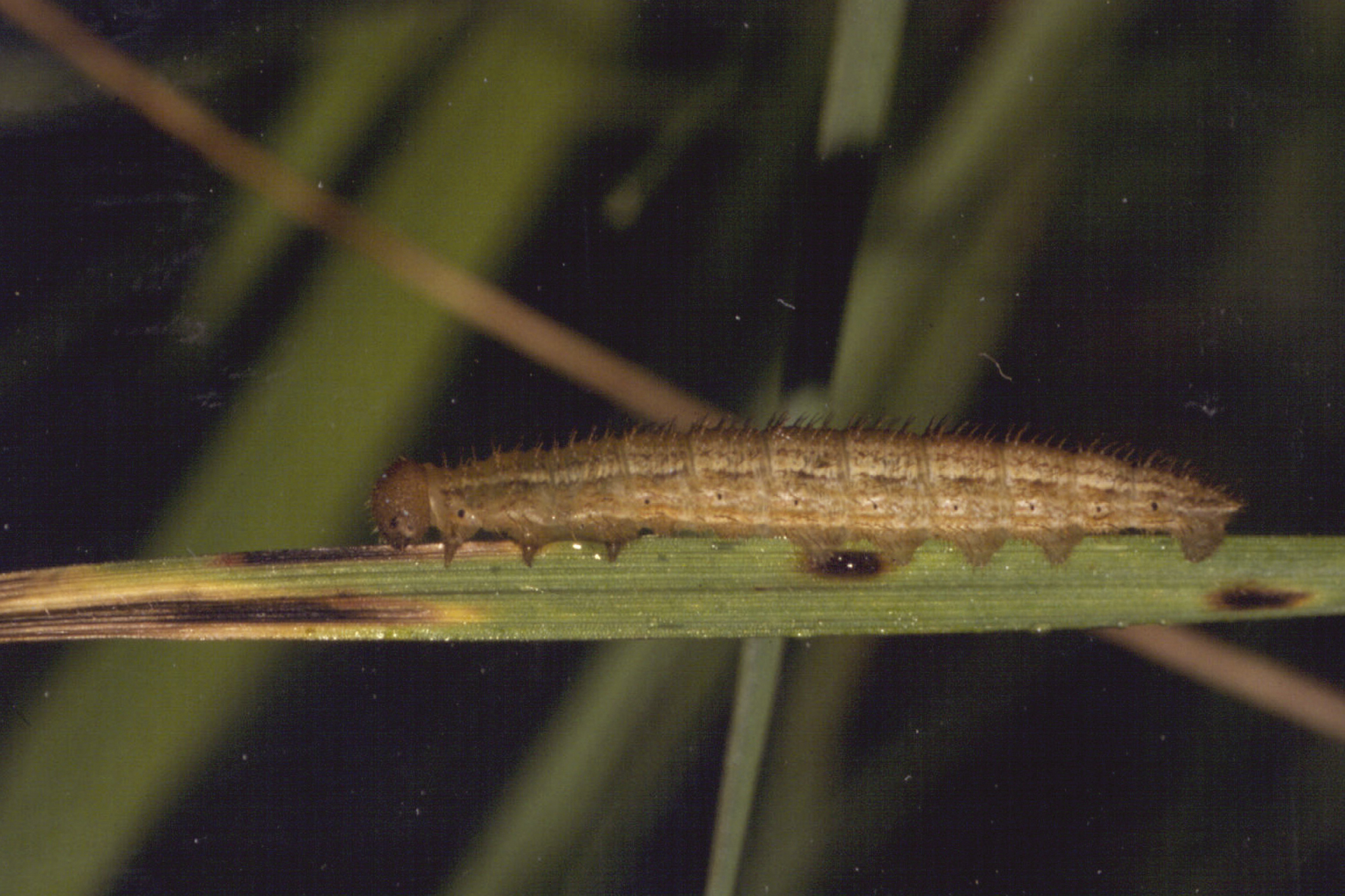
Caterpillar

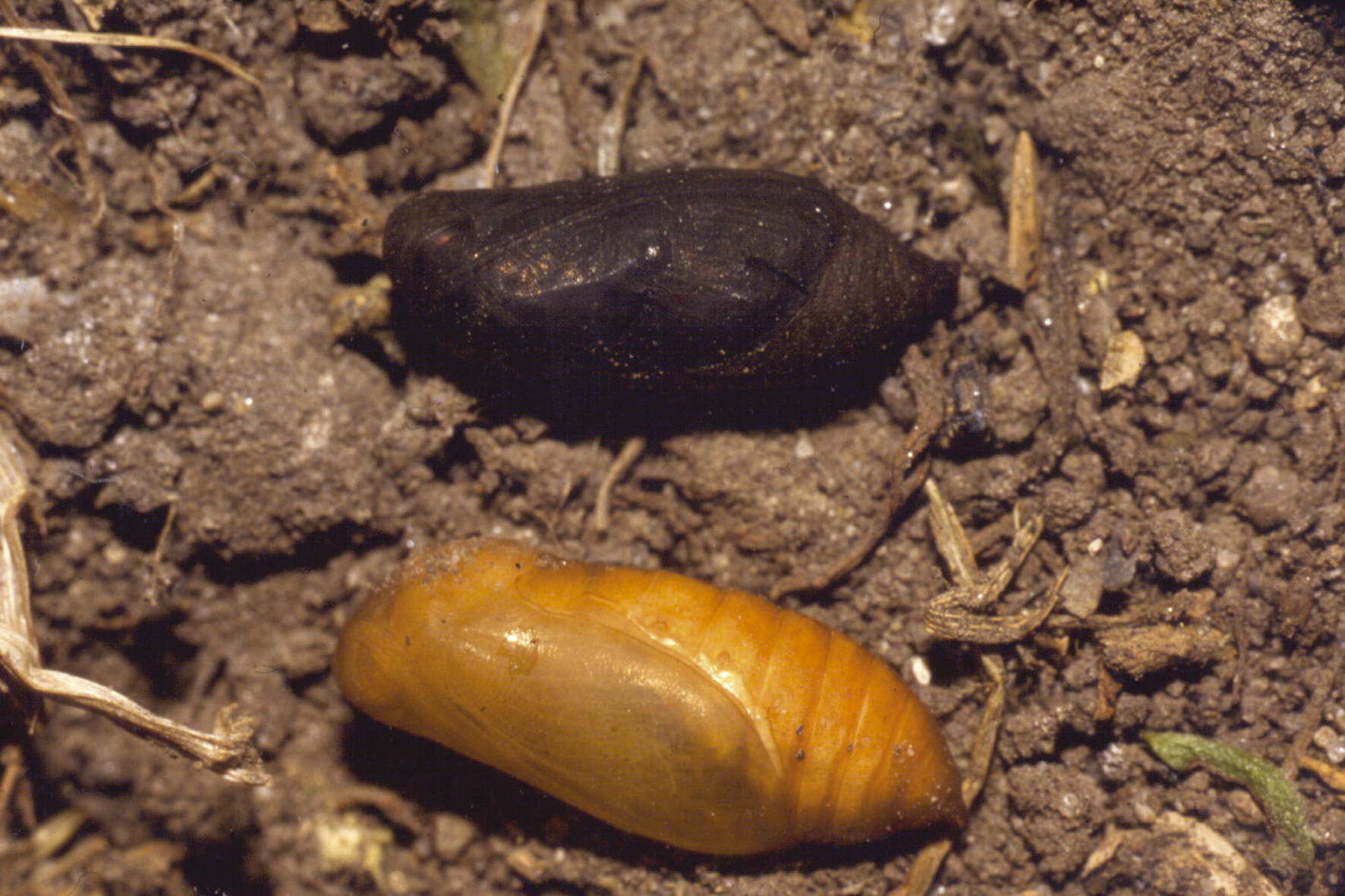
Pupa

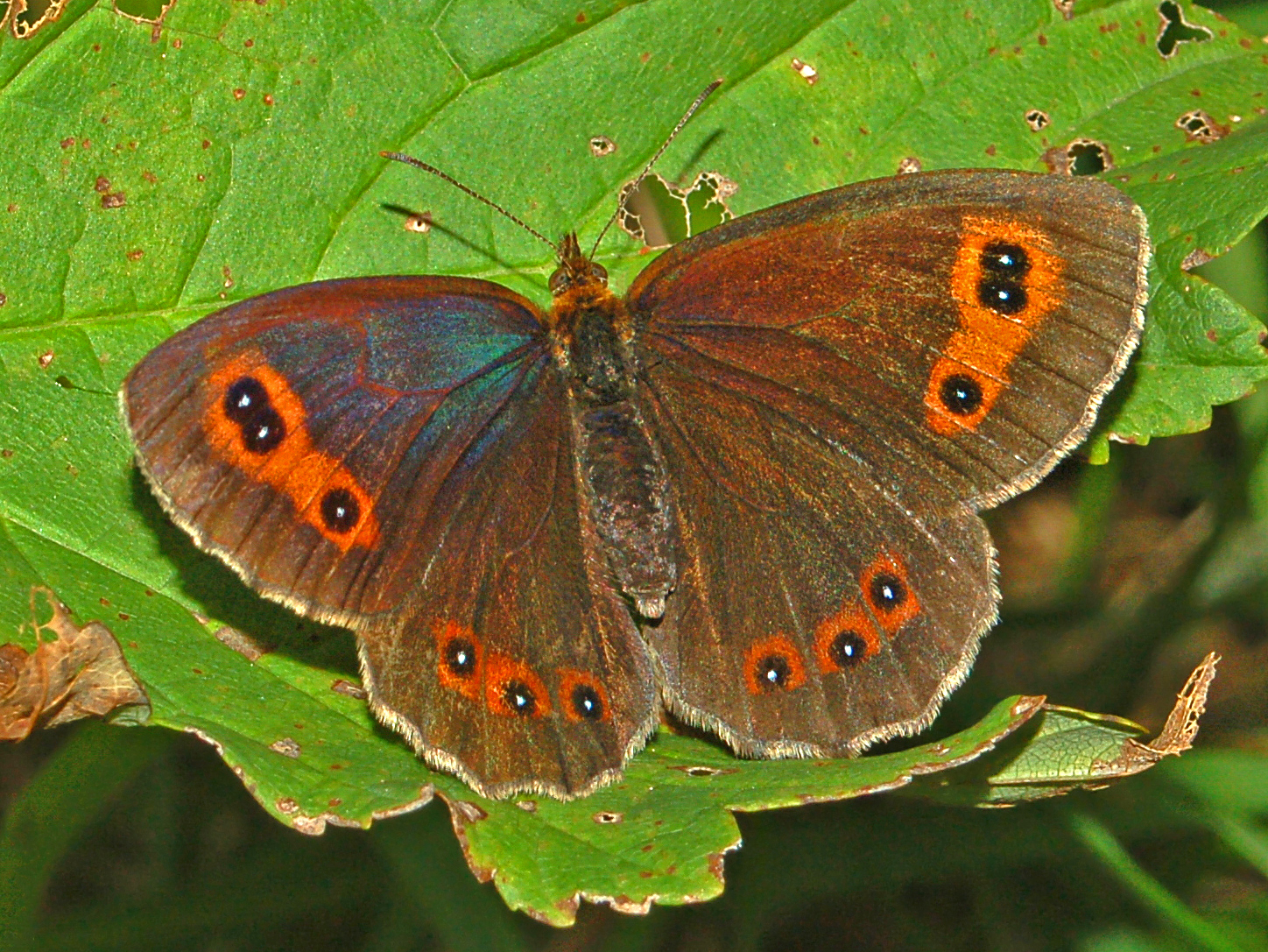
E. a. aethiops

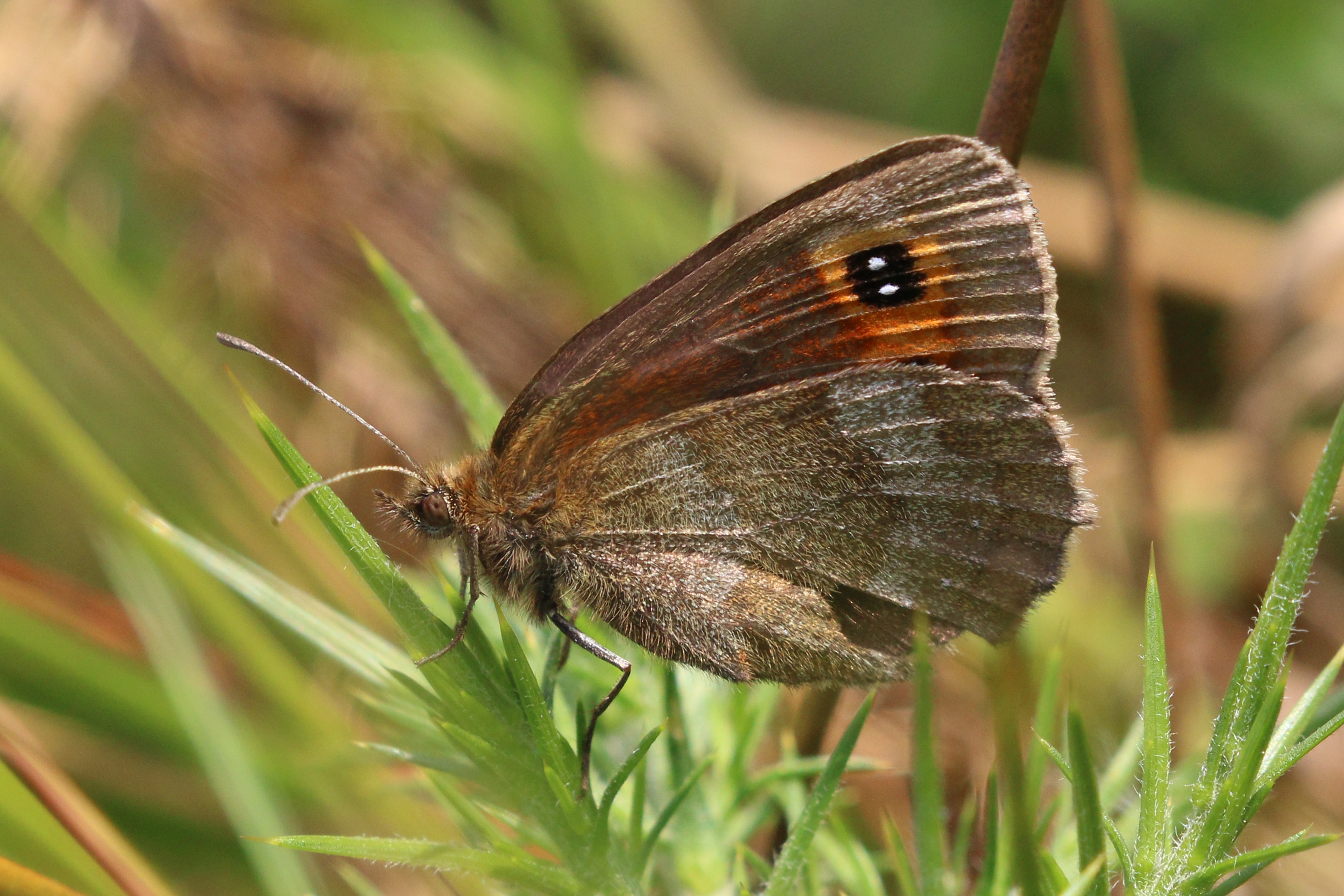
E. a. caledonia
Argyll, Scotland
