= Catshaw =

Hamlet in South Yorkshire, England

Coordinates: 53.5265927°N 1.6969371°W

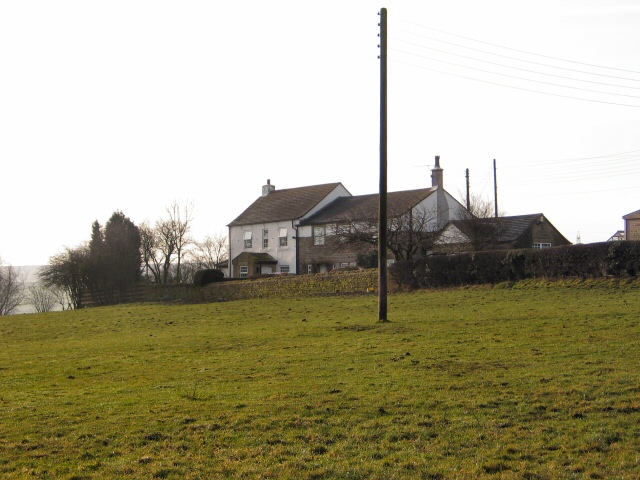
- Cottages at Catshaw

- Location within South Yorkshire
- District: Barnsley
- Shire county: South Yorkshire
- Region: Yorkshire and the Humber
- Country: England
- Sovereign state: United Kingdom
- Post town: SHEFFIELD
- Postcode district: S36
- Police: South Yorkshire
- Fire: South Yorkshire
- Ambulance: Yorkshire

Catshaw is a hamlet in the western parts of Penistone, in the Barnsley district, in the county of South Yorkshire, England. It lies about 0.9 miles (1.4 km) west of Millhouse Green, on the outskirts of the Peak District. It is south of the B6106 road and 0.3 miles (0.5 km) north of the River Don.

== Notable people ==
- David Hey (1938–2016), author and local historian
