= Arnside Tower =

Castle in Cumbria, England

- Cumbria, England
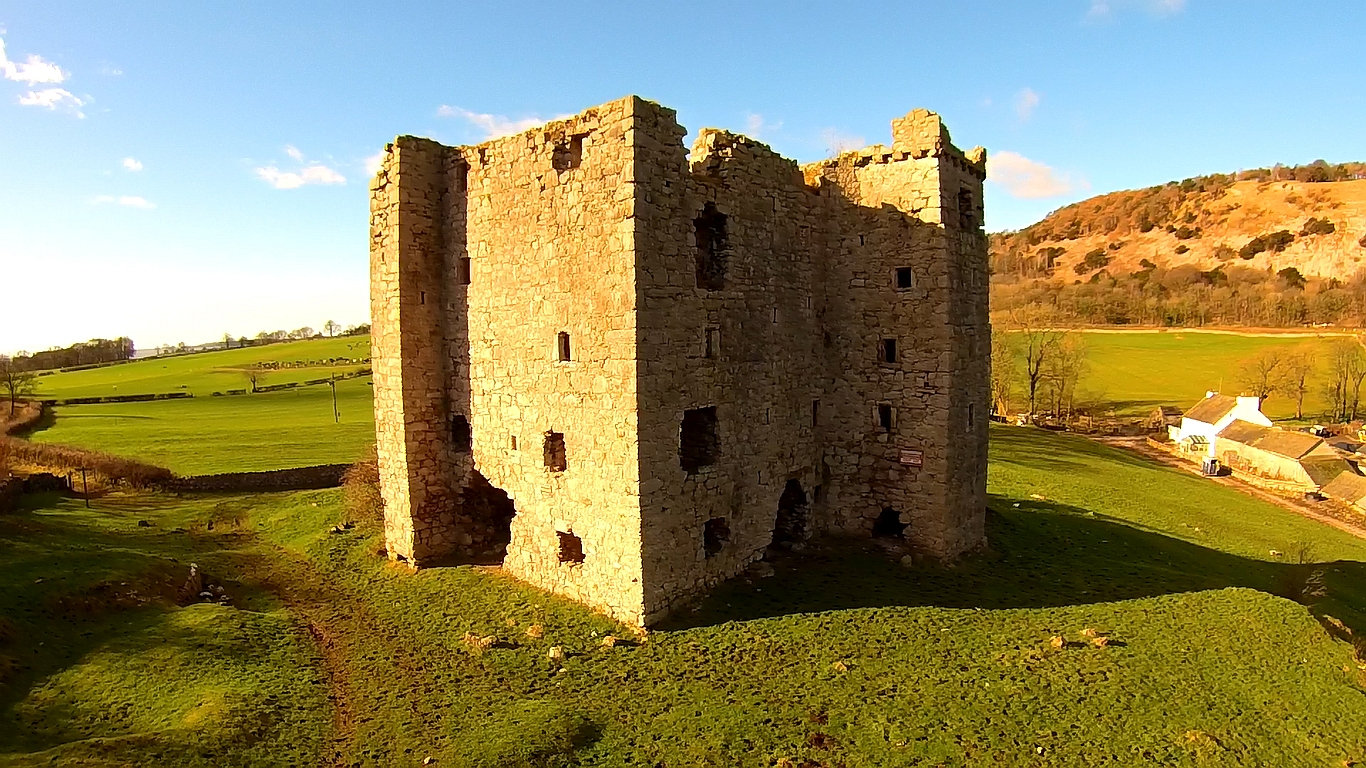
- Arnside Tower

Site information
- Type: Tower house
- Owner: private
- Open to the public: no
- Condition: Ruined

Location
- Location in South Lakeland Location in Cumbria
- Coordinates: 54.1841°N 2.8335°W
- Grid reference: grid reference SD457768

Site history
- Materials: Limestone rubble

Arnside Tower is a late-medieval tower house (or Pele tower) between Arnside and Silverdale immediately to the south of Arnside Knott in Cumbria, England.

== History ==
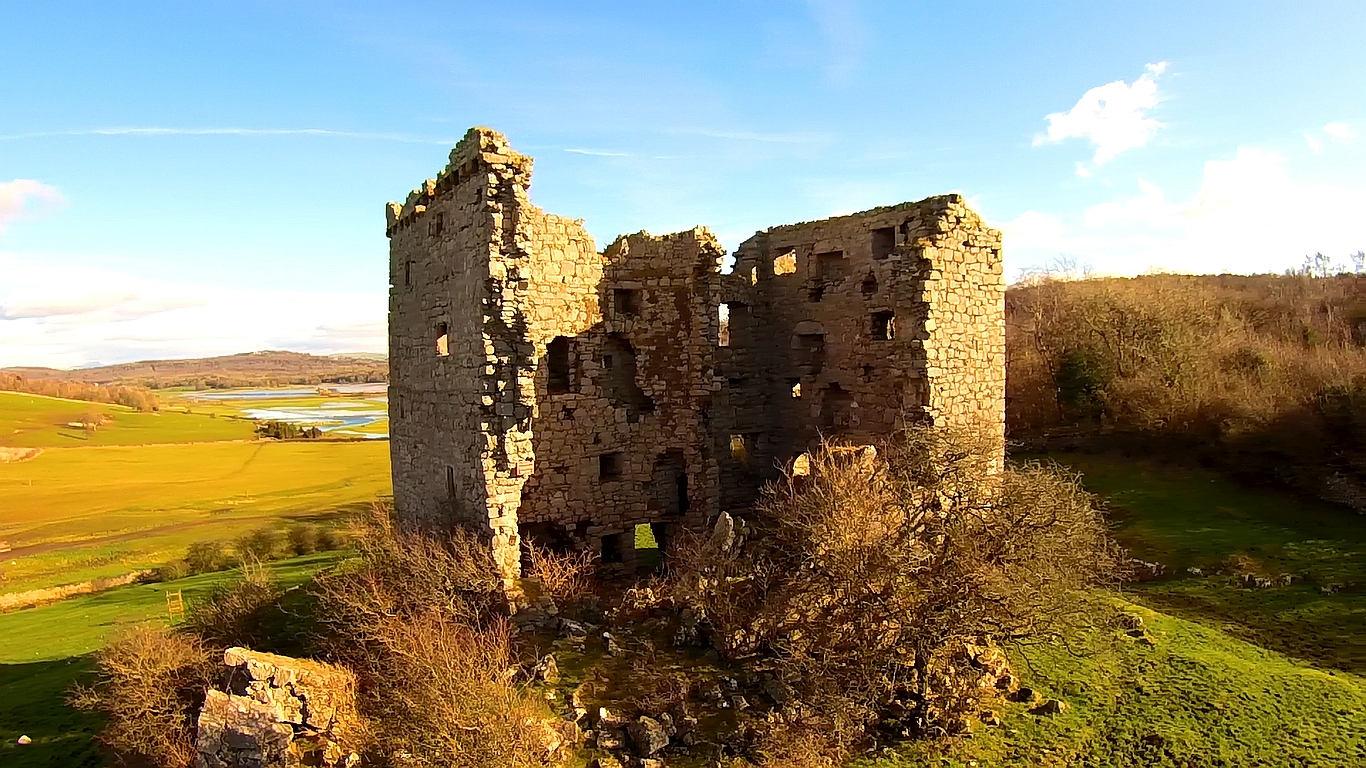
The northwestern side of the tower collapsed in the early 1900s. Silverdale Moss is visible in the background

Arnside Tower was built in the second half of the 15th century. Tower houses were built throughout the border regions of northern England and southern Scotland because of the threat posed by Border Reivers. Constructed of limestone rubble, the tower was originally five storeys high, measuring 50 feet by 34 feet. The tower was built with an adjacent wing of equal height built onto the side of the tower in a style common in Scotland, but rare in English tower houses. Historian Anthony Emery suggests that the design may have been influenced by that at Ashby de la Zouch Castle, rebuilt in 1464 by Lord Hastings. The tower suffered a serious fire in 1602 but after repairs remained in use; the historian Anthony Emery states that the tower was in use until the end of the 17th century, but the historian Roy Palmer states that William Coward and his sister Agnes Wheeler lived there at the end of the 18th century.

One of the walls of the tower collapsed around 1900, and as of 2014, English Heritage considered that the condition of the castle was very bad, and that urgent works were required. Arnside Tower is a Scheduled Monument and Grade II* listed building.

== Tourism ==
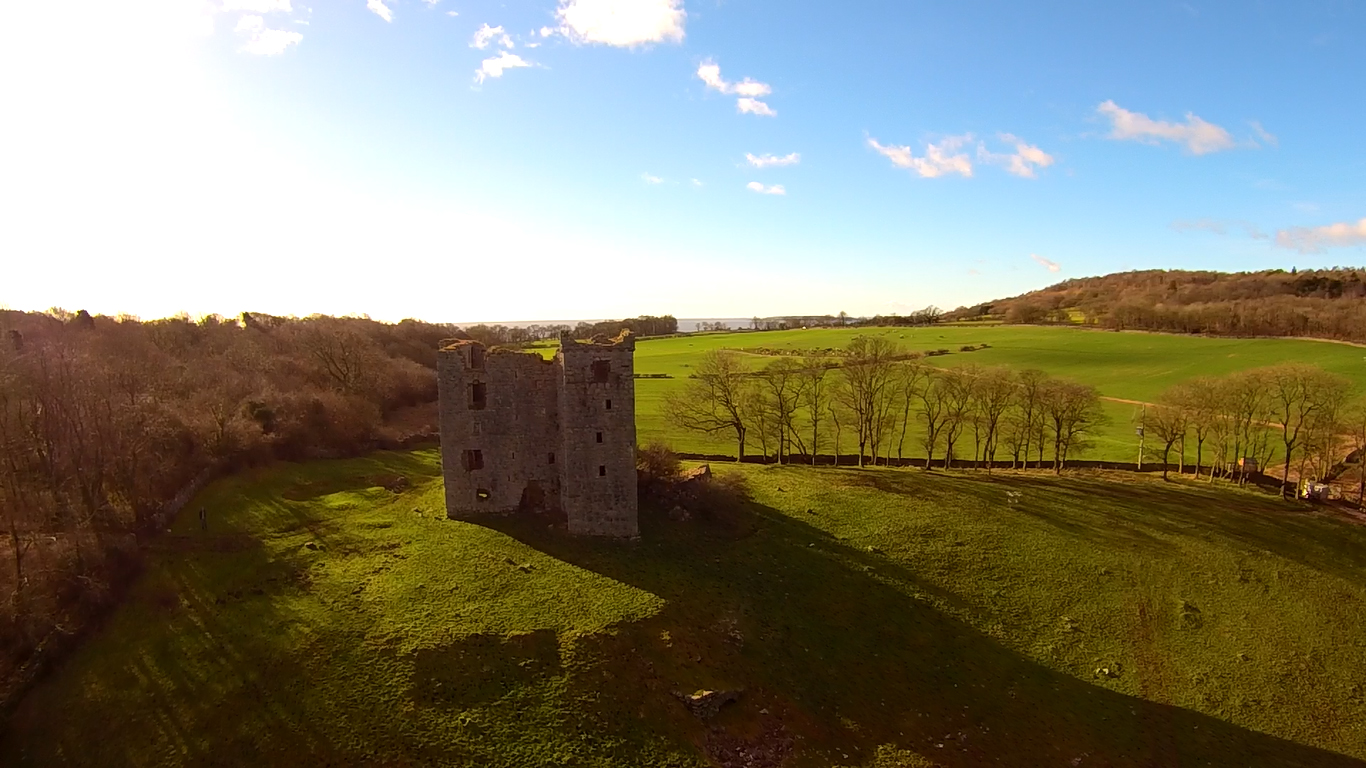
Looking south-west towards Morecambe Bay.

The tower is in private ownership and is in a ruinous state. The local tourist board recommends that good views of the tower can be seen from the public footpath which runs alongside.

== See also ==
- Grade II* listed buildings in Westmorland and Furness
- Listed buildings in Arnside
- Castles in Great Britain and Ireland
- List of castles in England

== Bibliography ==
- Emery, Anthony. (1996) Greater Medieval Houses of England and Wales, 1300-1500: Northern England. Cambridge: Cambridge University Press. ISBN 978-0-521-49723-7.
- Pettifer, Adrian. (2002) English Castles: a Guide by Counties. Woodbridge, UK: Boydell Press. ISBN 978-0-85115-782-5.
