= Alan Ball Local History Awards =

The Alan Ball Local History Awards in the United Kingdom exist to recognise outstanding contributions in local history publishing (both in print and in new media), and to encourage the publishing of such works by public libraries and local authorities. The awards were established in the 1980s and were originally run by the Library Services Trust. but are now run by the CILIP Local Studies Group. They are named after the local history author and former chief librarian of the London Borough of Harrow. A maximum of three awards are made each year. More details can be found on the current organisers' website.

== Awards ==
The following is the partial list of award winners.

=== 2021 ===
- Hard-copy joint winner: The Picture of Yarmouth: 200 Years of Built Heritage. Published by the Great Yarmouth Local History & Archaeological Society.
- Hard-copy joint winner: Louise Ryland-Epton (ed), Bremhill Parish Through the Ages: The Heritage of a Wiltshire Community. Published by the Bremhill Parish History Group.
- Hard-copy highly commended: Lewis N Wood, Banstead War Memorial – 100 Years: An Illustrated history. Published by the Banstead History Research Group.
- Hard-copy highly commended: Clare Wichbold – Hard Work – But Glorious: Stories from the Herefordshire Suffrage Campaign (self-published).
- Community award joint winner: Alison Wilson with Anna Crutchley and Lilian Rundblad, photography by Faruk Kara, A Community Remembers: Histon Road (book with CD). Published by the Histon Road Area Residents Association.
- Community award joint winner: Nunnery Lane and Clementhorpe: Exploring Old Shops and Pubs in York. Published by the Clements Hall Local History Group.
- E-publication: South West Heritage Trails – Torbay Discovery Heritage Trail https://www.southwestheritagetrails.org.uk/. Published by South West Heritage Trust.

=== 2020 ===
- Hard-copy winner: John Simpson (ed), Managing Poverty: Cheltenham Settlement Examinations and Removal Orders, 1831-5 2. Published by the Bristol and Gloucestershire Archaeological Society.
- Highly commended: Rowan Whimster, Ramsbury: A Place and its People. Published by the Friends of the Holy Cross Church, Ramsbury.
- Community award: Louise Wong (ed.), Crossing the Borders [Stories of the S E Asian communities in Manchester]. An NLHF funded project by the Wai Yin Society / Manchester University / Ahmed Iqbal Ulah RACE centre – Manchester Central Library / Manchester Art Gallery.
- E publication award: Stroudwater History website – https://stroudwaterhistory.org.uk. Published by the Stroudwater Navigation Archive Charity.

=== 2019 ===
- Delving along the Derwent: a history of 200 quarries and the people who worked in them, National Stone Centre.
- The Post War History of Leicester 1945-1962 (web site), East Midlands Oral History Archive.

=== 2018 ===
- A Swindon Time Capsule: Working Class Life 1899-1984. Highlights from the Dixon-Attwell Collection held at Swindon Central Library, by Graham Carter, Swindon Heritage, Local Studies (Swindon Libraries).
- Poole, the First World War and its Legacy (web site), Poole Museum.
- Bristol Old Vic Archive (web site), Bristol Bristol Old Vic Heritage, Amy Spreadbury.

=== 2017 ===
- Miss Weeton, Governess and Traveller, ed Alan Roby; Wigan Archives.
- Spratton Local History Society website

=== 2015 ===
- West Sussex Remembering 1914-18, eds. Martin Hayes and Emma White; West Sussex County Council.
- Buxton Museum Apps, Buxton Museum.
- Milford Street Bridge Project, Milford Street Bridge Project, St Edmunds Community Association.

=== 2010 ===
- East Lothian Council, East Lothian 1945–2000, Sonia Baker (editor)
- Epping Forest District Council, The Life and Art of Octavius Dixie Deacon, Chris Pond and Richard Morris
- Nottinghamshire County Council, These Uncertaine Tymes: Newark and the Civilian Experience of the Civil Wars 1640–1660, Stuart Jennings

=== 2007 ===
- Bedfordshire Women's Land Army (web site), Bedfordshire County Council, Stuart Antrobus
- The Somerset Wetlands: An Ever Changing Environment, Somerset Books, Pat Hill-Cottingham, Derek Briggs, Richard Brunning, Andy King, Graham Rix

=== 2006 ===
- Norfolk E-Map Explorer (web site), Norfolk County Council
- Viewing the Lifeless Body, A Coroner and his inquests held in Nottinghamshire Public Houses during the Nineteenth Century, 1828–1866, Nottinghamshire County Council, Bernard Heathcote.

=== 2005 ===
- Beyond the Grave: Exploring Newcastle's Burial Grounds, Newcastle City Council, Alan Morgan

=== 2004 ===
- Am Baile/The Gaelic Village (web site), Highland Council, Interactive Bureau
- Steam And Speed: Railways Of Tyne And Wear, Newcastle upon Tyne City Council, Andy Guy
- The Shadow of the Gallows: Crime and Punishment on Tyneside in the Eighteenth Century, Newcastle Libraries & Information Service, Barry Redfern
- Picture The Past (web site), Nottinghamshire County Council, Nottingham City Council, Derbyshire County Council and Derby City Council

=== 2003 ===
- Kinder Scout: Portrait of a Mountain, Roly Smith

=== 1999 ===
- Southwark: An Illustrated History, London Borough of Southwark, Leonard Reilly
- City of Westminster
- Leading the way: a history of Lancashire's roads, Lancashire County Council, Alan Crosby

=== 1998 ===
- City of Newcastle upon Tyne, Richard Caddel and Anthony Flowers
- Guardian of the Trent: The Story of Newark Castle, Nottinghamshire County Council, Pamela Marshall and John Samuels
- Stockport: a History, Stockport Metropolitan Borough Council, Peter Arrowsmith

=== 1997 ===
- All about Bede: the life and times of the Venerable Bede, 672 - 735 AD, City of Sunderland, Terry Deary
- The History of Croxley Green Through Its Street Names, Croxley Green Parish Council, Shirley Greenman
- The Lancashire cotton industry : a history since 1700, Lancashire County Council, Mary B Rose

=== 1996 ===
- Contrasts in a Victorian city, Birmingham: sources and notes for a study of Victorian Birmingham, Birmingham City Council, Richard Albutt, Martin Flynn, Philippa Bassett, Jackie Inman
- Working Children in Nineteenth Century Lancashire, Lancashire County Council, Michael Winstanley
- William Morris at Merton, London Borough of Merton, David Saxby

=== 1994 ===
- Essex Gold: Fortunes of the Essex Oysterman, Essex County Council, Hervey Benham
- Durham Cathedral: artists & images, Durham County Council, Patricia R. Andrew
- Merton Priory, London Borough of Merton, Penny Bruce and Simon Mason
- Beardmore built: the rise and fall of a Clydeside shipyard, Clydebank District Council, Ian Johnston
- Shropshire From the Air: Man and The Landscape, Shropshire County Council, Michael Watson and Chris Musson

=== 1993 ===
- Romans on the Wight, Isle of Wight County Council
- Riot!: the story of the East Lancashire loom-breakers in 1826, Lancashire County Council, Jim Walker
- Newcastle's changing map, City of Newcastle upon Tyne, M Barke and RJ Buswell
- The Wakes of Northamptonshire: A Family History, Northamptonshire County Council, Peter Gordon
- Huddersfield: A Most Handsome Town, Kirklees Metropolitan Borough Council, EA Hilary Haigh

=== 1992 ===
- I-spy the London borough of Sutton, London Borough of Sutton
- Cinemas of Newcastle upon Tyne, Newcastle upon Tyne City Libraries and Arts, Frank Manders
- Tameside 1066–1700, Tameside Metropolitan Borough Council, Michael Nevell

=== 1991 ===
- Southwold River: Georgian Life in the Blyth Valley, Suffolk County Council, Rachel Lawrence
- Old Runcorn, Halton Borough Council, H F Starkey
- Waterways of Northamptonshire, Northamptonshire County Council, David Blagrove
- A Fighting Trade: Rail Transport in Tyne Coal, 1600-1800, Gateshead Metropolitan District Council, G. Bennett, E Clavering and A Rounding
- Archive Map Collection, Gateshead Metropolitan District Council, Les Turnbull

=== 1990 ===
- The goodliest place in Middlesex: being a history of the ancient parish of Ruislip which comprised Ruislip, Northwood, Eastcote, Ruislip Manor and South Ruislip, Hillingdon Libraries, Eileen M. Bowlt [Author Award]
- Williams Barnes: The Somerset Engravings, Somerset County Libraries, Laurence Keen [Book Production Award]

=== 1989 ===
- Author: Eileen M. Bowlt, Hillingdon Libraries
- Book production: Somerset County Library, Keen

=== 1988 ===
- Patrick Dillon & Wiltshire County Library

=== 1987 ===
- Author: Helen & Richard Leacroft
- Book production: Cambridgeshire Libraries, Storey

=== 1986 ===
- Author: Eleanor & Rex C. Russell
- Book production: Northamptonshire Libraries, Rowland Holloway

== See also ==
- List of history awards
- British Association for Local History
- English county histories
- English local history
- The Whitfield Prize
- Wolfson History Prize
