= Frank A. Hoare =

English film producer (1894–1980)

Frank Alan Hoare CBE (4 October 1894 – 23 January 1980) was an English film producer known for his documentaries and work for the Children's Film Foundation (CFF). He was chairman of the Association of Specialised Film Producers.

== Early life ==
Frank Hoare was born 4 October 1894 in Cobham, Surrey. At the time of the 1911 census he was living in the parish of East Challow, Wantage, in Berkshire.

== Career ==
In 1932, Hoare was director of research for Western Electric Limited. He developed 16mm mobile film units to produce industrial and documentary films. In 1936 he was a director of Sound Services Limited, Publicity Films Limited and Merton Park Studios Limited, being appointed managing director in 1940. He was the representative for film production on the Films Council of the Board of Trade and produced propaganda and training films during the Second World War.

He was particularly known for his documentaries and work for the Children's Film Foundation. He was a member of the British Kinematograph Society and was chairman of the Association of Specialised Film Producers in which capacity he made a plea at their annual meeting in 1950 for the tax on cinema tickets to be cut to the same level as that on football match admission.

He was appointed CBE in the New Year Honours 1959. Later that year he was appointed joint managing director of Westward Television Syndicate which had been established to act as programme contractors for a new television station to established in the South-West of England. It began broadcasting in 1961. Hoare resigned in August 1963.

Hoare died in Mallorca on 23 January 1980.

== Selected publications ==
- "Production techniques in the making of educational films", British Kinematography, Vol. 22, No. 6 (June 1953), pp. 176–181.

== See also ==
- Terrick V. H. FitzHugh
