= Listed buildings in Arnside =

Arnside is a civil parish in Westmorland and Furness of Cumbria, England. It contains four listed buildings that are recorded in the National Heritage List for England. Of these, one is listed at Grade II*, the middle of the three grades, and the others are at Grade II, the lowest grade. The parish contains the village of Arnside and the surrounding countryside. The listed buildings consist of a ruined tower house, which is also a scheduled monument, a farmhouse, a large house, and a signal box.

== Key ==
Grade	Criteria
II*	Particularly important buildings of more than special interest
II	Buildings of national importance and special interest

== Buildings ==
Name and location	Photograph	Date	Notes	Grade
Arnside Tower; 54.18444°N 2.83084°W		15th century (probable)	A fortified tower house, without a hall, that was damaged by fire in 1602, and later repaired, but now a ruin. It is in limestone with sandstone dressings and has a rectangular plan, originally with five storeys. Three of its walls are standing, there is a northeast projection containing an oven and four rooms above, and a garderobe projection at the southwest. The building is also a scheduled monument.	II*
Saltcotes Farm; 54.20160°N 2.82853°W	—	1679	The farmhouse was extended in the 19th century. It is in roughcast stone and has a green slate roof with a stone ridge. There are three storeys, three bays, and a two-storey recessed right extension. On the front is a two-storey gabled porch that has a doorway with a moulded surround and a decorative initialled and dated lintel. The windows are mullioned in chamfered stone surrounds, some with hood moulds.	II
Ash Meadow; 54.19995°N 2.83969°W	—	c. 1815–20	A large stone house, used at one time as a school, partly roughcast, partly rendered, with Welsh slate roofs. It has an irregular plan, with three parallel ranges, and has two storeys with cellars. The north front has three bays on a plinth and a verandah carried round both sides. The entrance is on the east front, and has a doorway with a moulded architrave and a cornice on consoles. In the east front are French windows, and the other windows are sashes.	II
Signal box 54.20358°N 2.82966°W		1897	The signal box was provided for the Furness Railway. It is in carboniferous limestone with dressings in Devonian sandstone, and a hipped slate roof with a terracotta ridge and pointed-ball finials. There are two storeys, the upper storey being slightly jettied, and with continuous glazing at the front and on the sides. External stone steps lead up to the entrance on the south-eastern end. At the rear is a projecting chimney with quoins that is supported by three corbels.	II
