= English local history =

Local history is the study of the history of a relatively small geographic area; typically a specific settlement, parish or county. English local history came to the fore with the antiquarians of the 19th century and was particularly emphasised by the creation of the Victoria County History series in England. Its establishment as a formal academic discipline is usually credited to W. G. Hoskins, who also popularised the subject with his book The Making of the English Landscape.

== History ==
There is incidental material in the writings of Bede which can be used for local history, although he wrote a national rather than local history. During the late medieval, travel writers such as John Leland frequently visited and described local antiquities, although again, these writers did not set out to write local history. The Tudor period saw the publication of national gazetteers (for example Camden) that frequently contained brief local histories. The eighteenth century saw the emergence of county historians such as Nichols and Morant who were arguably the first local historians. These writers took an interest in subjects that are currently unfashionable (such as manorial descents), but often contain important details which can be used by a modern local historian.

The nineteenth century saw the widespread publication of parish histories, often written by the local minister. In 1879, Cox published the first edition of his How to Write the History of a Parish that would be used by local historians and genealogists for many years. In 1899, the Victoria County History project began to provide a sound academic basis for local history. The early twentieth century saw individuals in universities with job titles related to local history, and the first department of Local History was established at Leicester in 1947. Interest in local history expanded in the second half of the twentieth century both in numbers and scope. Contemporary researchers gather conclusions from a wide range of academic disciplines.

== Research techniques ==
Local history research, like that of family history, is accessible to people without prior historical training or experience. This is because the very nature of local history is such that starting points are always available locally. A lay researcher can learn the necessary skills as they research. Archivists and societies can provide advice, encouragement, and information; formal courses of study are also widely available. Many local historians are non-specialists, who have an enthusiasm for history and have applied this to their area.

Most local history researchers follow a process in which they start from the basic facts offered by the available evidence, make a more detailed analysis of that evidence to explore its implications, and then put that analysis in its wider temporal and geographical context. Some take a more theoretical approach: starting from a hypothesis, which they seek to demonstrate or disprove through evidence.

== Primary sources ==
The survival and availability of local records differ significantly from area to area. West is a good guide to what records may exist and how they might be used. Similarly, Iredale describes where records may be found and how they can be used, although his work is somewhat dated in parts. There are numerous guides to individual record categories which can be found in bibliographies or referenced in more general works. N. W. Alcock's Old Title Deeds is an introduction to an under-used source for local history.

== Secondary sources ==
Where it exists, the appropriate volume of the Victoria County History is the best starting point for a locality in England. There is often a local studies library which will contain a wealth of local material. Early county historians, e.g. Philip Morant and his History and Antiquities of Essex, often provide parish by parish accounts, although they frequently include long descriptions of manorial descents which are of little interest to the current generation of historians. If there is a history of the parish church, this may well contain useful material.

== See also ==
- Alan Ball Local History Awards
- English county histories
- List of historical societies#United Kingdom and Crown dependencies
- Microhistory
- One-place study
- Victoria County History
