= Robert Wilson (cricketer, born 1922) =

English cricketer and Royal Air Force officer

Personal information
- Full name: Robert Greenwood Wilson
- Born: 20 December 1922; Arnside, Westmorland, England
- Died: 6 March 1980 (aged 57); Swindon, Wiltshire, England
- Batting: Right-handed
- Bowling: Right-arm fast-medium

Career statistics
Competition	First-class
Matches	14
Runs scored	662
Batting average	28.78
100s/50s	1/3
Top score	100
Balls bowled	1,302
Wickets	24
Bowling average	27.29
5 wickets in innings	1
10 wickets in match	–
Best bowling	5/41
Catches/stumpings	7/–
- Source: Cricinfo, 1 March 2019

Robert Greenwood Wilson (20 November 1922 – 6 March 1980) DFC AFC was an English first-class cricketer and Royal Air Force officer. Having served during World War II, Wilson's career with the Royal Air Force spanned over two decades, for which he was decorated three times. He played first-class cricket for the Combined Services cricket team, before becoming the secretary of Nottinghamshire County Cricket Club from 1972–77.

== Early life and services cricket ==
Born at Arnside in Westmorland, Wilson was commissioned as a pilot officer with the Royal Air Force Volunteer Reserve in April 1942. While serving with 614 Squadron in August 1945, Wilson was awarded the Distinguished Flying Cross. Following the war, he gained the rank of flying officer on a permanent basis in January 1947, by which point he was serving with the Royal Air Force.

He played first-class cricket for the Combined Services cricket team, making his debut against Glamorgan at Pontypridd. He made twelve first-class appearances for the Combined Services up to and including 1952, scoring 633 runs at an average of 30.14. He made one century, scoring exactly 100 against Hampshire in 1949. A right-arm fast-medium bowler, Wilson took 24 wickets at a bowling average of 27.29, with best figures of 5 for 41. Alongside his matches for the Combined Services, Wilson also appeared in one first-class match for the Free Foresters against Cambridge University in 1950 at Fenner's.

== Later military career and life ==
Wilson gained the rank of squadron leader in January 1953. In the 1957 Birthday Honours, he was awarded the Air Force Cross (AFC). He gained the rank of wing commander in January 1959. In the 1963 Birthday Honours, Wilson was awarded a bar to his AFC. Two years later in 1965, he was promoted to the rank of group captain.

After retiring from the Royal Air Force, Wilson was the secretary of Nottinghamshire County Cricket Club from 1972–77. He died at Swindon in March 1980.
