= Agnes Wheeler =

British writer

- Born: Agnes Cowherd/Coward bap. 1734; Lancashire
- Died: 1804; Beetham
- Writing career
- Pen name: "A.W."

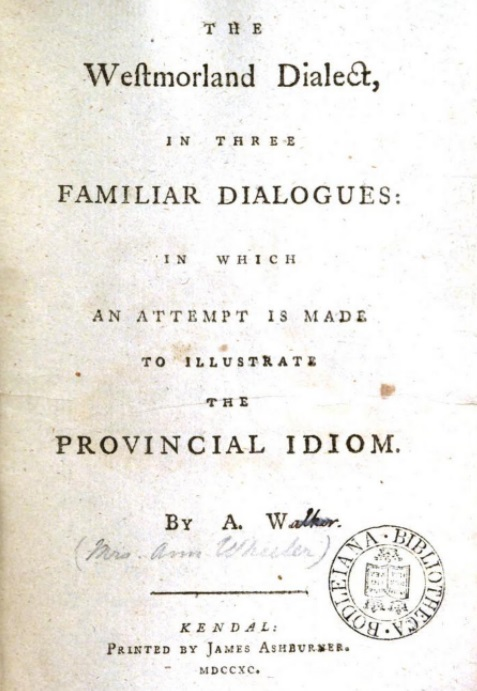
The Westmorland Dialect, in three familiar Dialogues: in which an Attempt is made to illustrate the provincial Idiom.

Agnes Wheeler or Ann Coward (bap. 1734 – 1804) was a British writer on the Cumbrian dialect. She is known for one book published in 1790. The Westmorland Dialect, in three familiar Dialogues: in which an Attempt is made to illustrate the provincial Idiom was an early attempt at recording the local dialect. There were four editions of the book. Her work was later used in Specimens of the Westmorland Dialect published by the Revd Thomas Clarke in 1887.

She was born near Cartmel and went to London for 18 years where she married a Captain Wheeler and worked as a housekeeper. She returned to Cumbria a widow where she wrote for the local press in plain English. She published her one book in dialect which initially had three dialogues but in later editions four. The conversations discuss a trip to London, the illness of George III, christenings, deaths, cockfights and other subjects including hairstyles and fashion.

Wheeler died in Beetham where she had lived with her brother William in the medieval Arnside Tower. She was buried on 4 November 1804.
