= Pamela Marshall (archaeologist) =

Archaeologist and historian

Pamela Marshall FSA

Academic background
- Education: University of Nottingham
- Thesis: Magna Turris: A study of the development, planning and use of social space in donjons of the eleventh and twelfth centuries located in the geographical territories of the Norman and Angevin kings of England (2006)

Academic work
- Discipline: Archaeology; History
- Sub-discipline: Buildings archaeology; Castellology
- Institutions: University of Nottingham; Castle Studies Group

Pamela Marshall FSA is an archaeologist and historian specialising in the study of castles. Marshall was elected as a Fellow of the Society of Antiquaries of London in 2007. She worked at the University of Nottingham, teaching in the departments of archaeology and continuing education until her retirement. Marshall's research on castles has examined castles in England and France, as they had a shared castle culture, and is an authority on great towers. Between 2000 and 2014, Marshall was chair/secretary of the Castle Studies Group and is Comité Permanent of the Colloques Château Gaillard, a biannual conference for castellologists.

== Education ==
Marshall completed a PhD at the University of Nottingham in 2006, titled Magna Turris: A study of the development, planning and use of social space in donjons of the eleventh and twelfth centuries located in the geographical territories of the Norman and Angevin kings of England.

== Career ==
In the 1990s the field of castle studies underwent a historiographical change, placing greater emphasis on the role of castles as symbols and expressions of status, and what they meant to people in the Middle Ages. Marshall was one of several researchers to apply this approach to great towers (keeps), alongside Philip Dixon and Sandy Heslop. Dixon and Marshall studied Hedingham Castle's keep, proposing to a "radical re-assessment" of the building as a ceremonial rather than domestic space. A similar approach at Norham Castle's keep by the duo revealed it had a complex building history.

Marshall co-directed excavations at Newark Castle, Nottinghamshire. The results were documented in the book Guardian of the Trent: the Story of Newark Castle, which won an Alan Ball Local History Award in 1998. Marshall was chair/secretary of the Castle Studies Group between 2000 and 2014, and was succeeded by Gillian Scott. Between 2000 and 2014, and again since 2020 Marshall has been the representative for Great Britain on the Comité Permanent of the Colloques Château Gaillard.

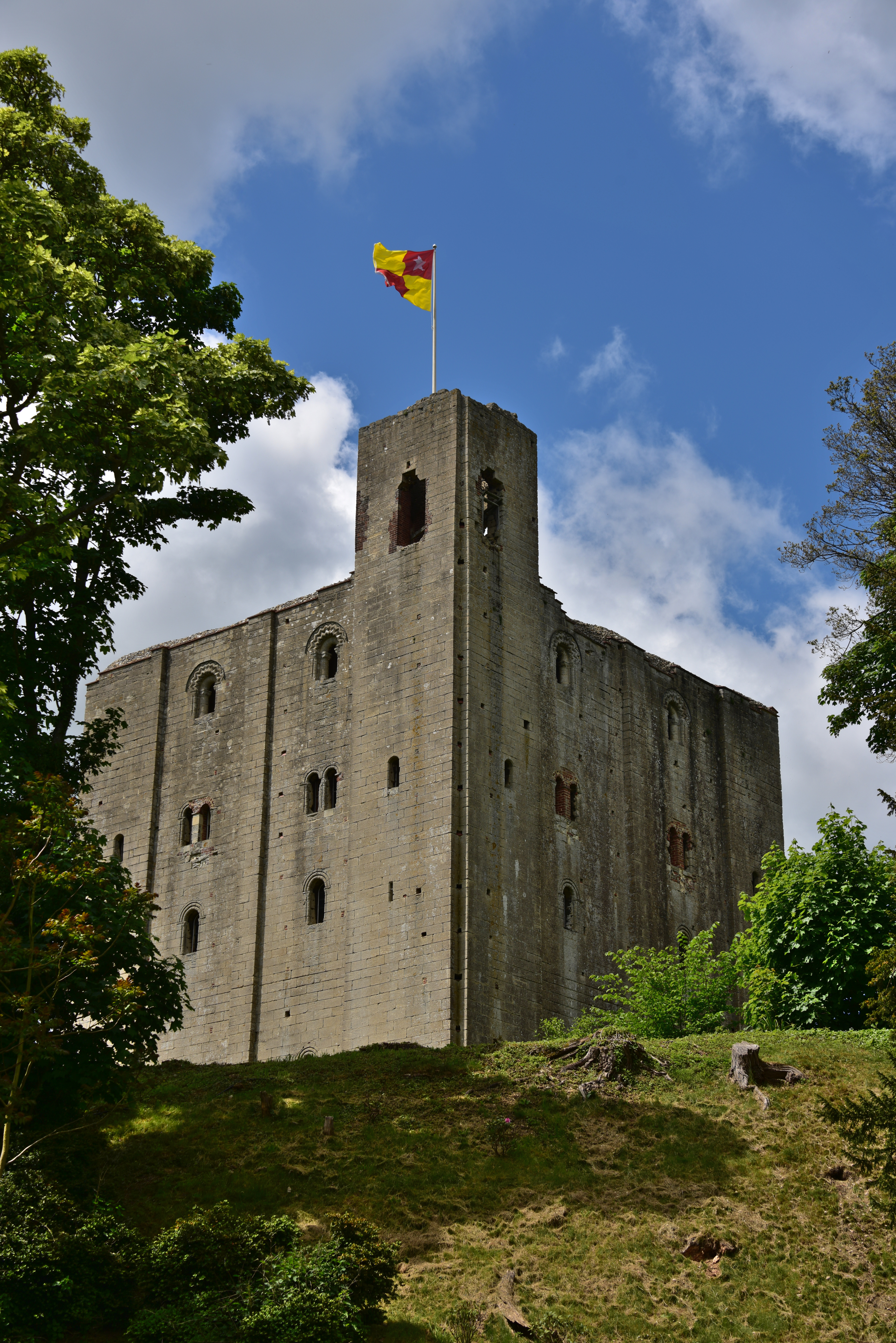
Marshall and Dixon reinterpreted Hedingham Castle, Essex

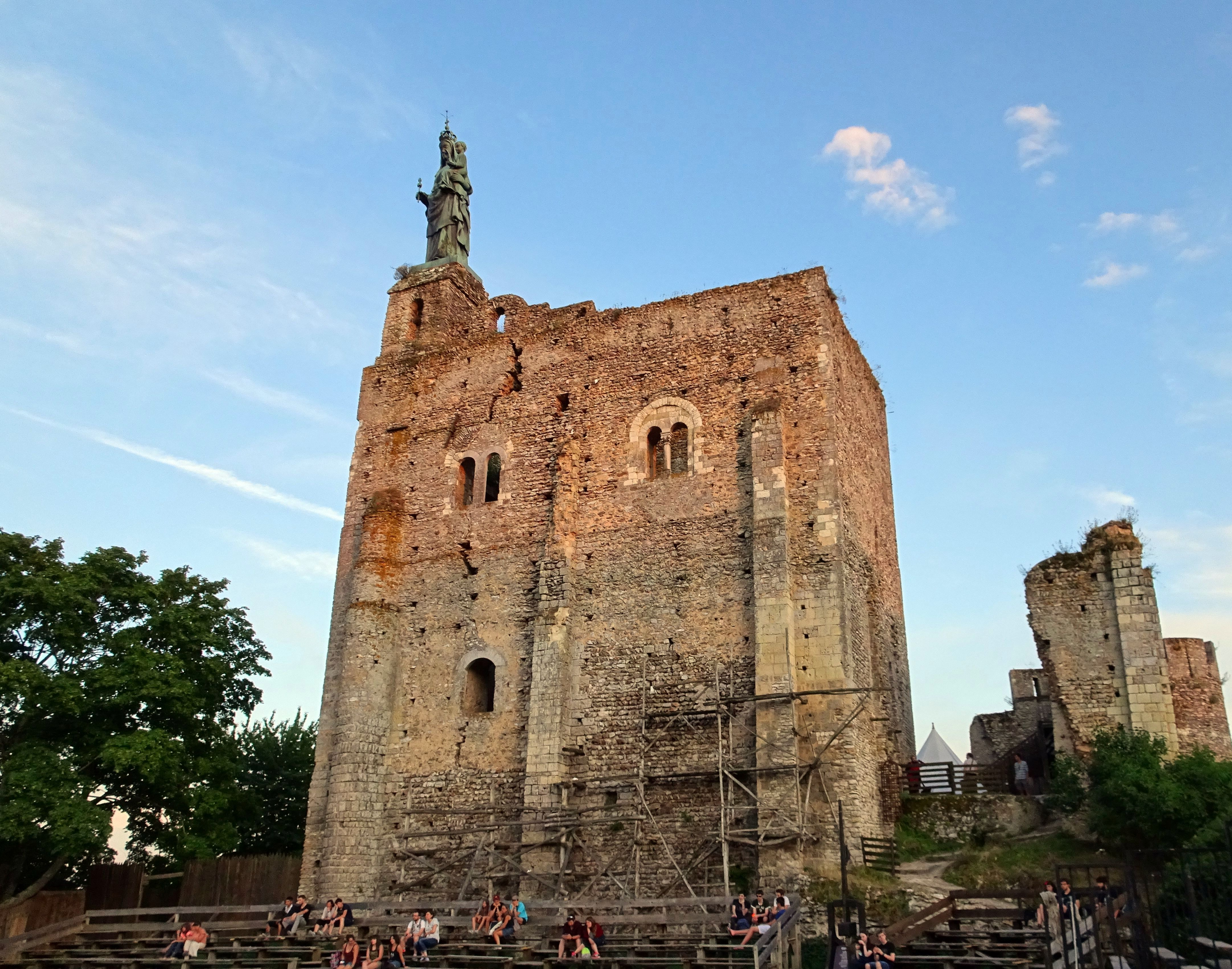
The Romanesque donjon at Montbazon

== Selected publications ==
Marshall has authored or co-authored six books and published articles in venues such as Château Gaillard: Etudes de castellologie médiévale, The Castle Studies Group Journal, The Archaeological Journal, and the Transactions of the Thoroton Society of Nottinghamshire.

=== Books ===
- Marshall, Pamela (2002), Mont Orgueil: A Review of the Archaeological and Historical Evidence, Jersey Heritage, Wikidata Q106907852
- Marshall, Pamela (1999). Wollaton Hall and the Willoughby Family. Nottingham Civic Society. ISBN 978-1-902443-05-8. OCLC 41466019. OL 12262299M. Wikidata Q106224809.
- Marshall, Pamela; Samuels, John (1997), Guardian of the Trent: The Story of Newark Castle, Newark Castle Trust, OL 9530903W, Wikidata Q63821945
- Marshall, Pamela (1996). Wollaton Hall: an Archaeological Survey. Nottingham: Nottingham Civic Society. ISBN 0-9504861-8-3. OL 11581147M. Wikidata Q101064187.

=== Articles and chapters ===
- Marshall, Pamela (2021). "The 15th-Century Great Tower at Tattershall Castle: Aspiration, Display and the Practicalities of Social Distinction". Château Gaillard. Etudes de castellologie médiévale. 29: 263–272. ISSN 0577-5752. Wikidata Q106875827.
- Marshall, Pamela (2018). "The Romanesque Donjon at Montbazon: A Reassessment". Castles: History, Archaeology, Landscape, Architecture and Symbolism. Essays in Honour of Derek Renn: 33–63. ISBN 978-0-9545884-1-0. Wikidata Q60054084.
- Marshall, Pamela (2016). "Some thoughts on the use of the Anglo-Norman donjon". Castles and the Anglo-Norman World: 159–174. ISBN 978-1-78570-022-4. JSTOR 10.2307/j.ctt1kw2b5s.18. Wikidata Q47495846.
- Marshall, Pamela (2015). "The Angevin donjon and its legacy in post-Conquest Britain". Tower Studies, 1 & 2. A House that Thieves might Knock at. Proceedings of the 2010 Stirling and 2011 Dundee Conferences on ‘The Tower as Lordly Residence’ and ‘The Tower and the Household’: 198–213. Wikidata Q60495864.
- Marshall, Pamela (2012). "Making an appearance: some thoughts on the phenomenon of multiple doorways and large upper openings in Romanesque donjons in western France and Britain". Château Gaillard. Etudes de castellologie médiévale. 25: 233–241. ISSN 0577-5752. Wikidata Q62561472.
- Marshall, Pamela (2009). "The Internal Arrangement of the Donjon at Colchester in Essex: a reconsideration" (PDF). The Castle Studies Group Journal. 23: 178–190. ISSN 2044-4605. Wikidata Q42354993.
- Marshall, Pamela (2004). "Improving the image: the transformation of bailey into courtyard at the 12th century bishop's castle at Newark, Nottinghamshire". Château Gaillard. Etudes de castellologie médiévale. 21: 203–213. ISSN 0577-5752. Wikidata Q56816938.
- Marshall, Pamela (2002). "The great tower as residence in the territories of the Norman and Angevin kings of England". The Seigneurial Residence in Western Europe, AD c. 800-1600: 27–44. Wikidata Q60494299.
- Dixon, Philip; Marshall, Pamela (2002). "Norwich Castle and its Analogues". The Seigneurial Residence in Western Europe, AD c. 800-1600: 235–243. Wikidata Q57652398.
- Marshall, Pamela (2002). "The ceremonial function of the donjon in the twelfth century". Château Gaillard. Etudes de castellologie médiévale. 20: 141–151. ISSN 0577-5752. Wikidata Q47089096.
- Marshall, Pamela (1998). "The Twelfth-Century Castle at Newark". Southwell and Nottinghamshire: Medieval Art, Architecture and Industry: 110–125. ISBN 978-0-901286-92-5. Wikidata Q95731397.
- Marshall, Pamela; T. Foulds (1997). "The Royal Castle". The Centenary History of Nottingham: 43–55. Wikidata Q106907942.
- Marshall, Pamela; Samuels, John (1994). "Recent excavations at Newark Castle, Nottinghamshire". Transactions of the Thoroton Society of Nottinghamshire. 98: 49–57. ISSN 0309-9210. Wikidata Q106205877.
- Dixon, Philip; Marshall, Pamela (1993). "The Great Tower in the Twelfth Century: The Case of Norham Castle". The Archaeological Journal. 150 (1): 410–432. doi:10.1080/00665983.1993.11078060. Wikidata Q45748310.
- Dixon, Philip; Marshall, Pamela (1992). "The Great Tower at Hedingham Castle: A Reassessment". Fortress: The Castles and Fortifications Quarterly. 18: 16–23. ISSN 0955-985X. Wikidata Q56451755.
