= Local history =

Study of history in a geographically local context

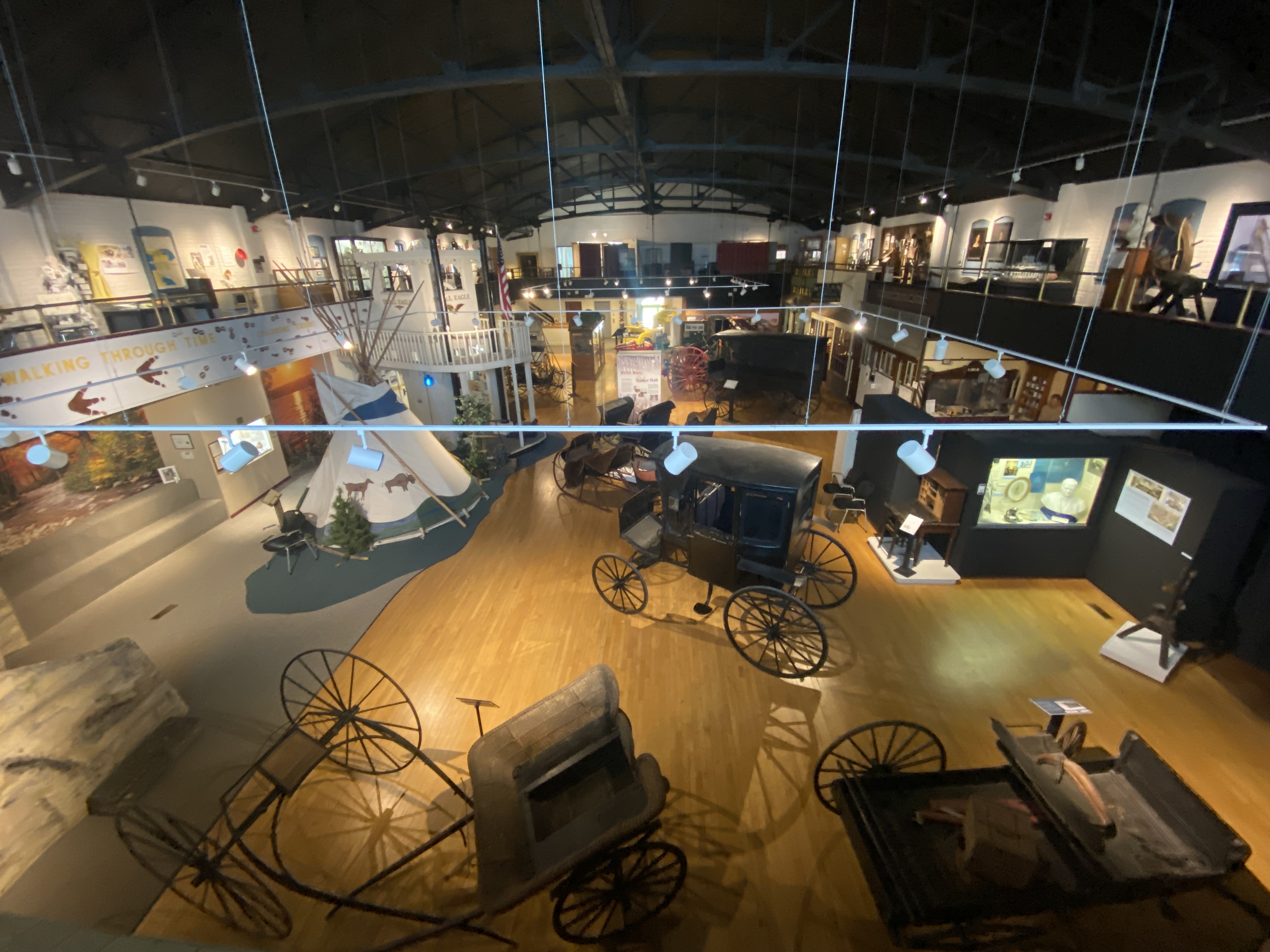
Exhibition hall displaying local history displays and objects

Local history is the study of history in a geographically local context, often concentrating on a relatively small local community. It incorporates cultural and social aspects of history. Local history is not merely national history writ small but a study of past events in a given geographical area which is based on a wide variety of documentary evidence and placed in a comparative context that is both regional and national. Historic plaques are one form of documentation of significant occurrences in the past and oral histories are another.

Local history is often documented by local historical societies or groups that form to preserve a local historic building or other historic site. Many works of local history are compiled by amateur historians working independently or archivists employed by various organizations. An important aspect of local history is the publication and cataloguing of documents preserved in local or national records which relate to particular areas.

In a number of countries a broader concept of local lore is known, which is a comprehensive study of everything pertaining to a certain locality. Both fields document places and people but differ in breadth: history prioritizes human events, while lore covers environmental and ethnographic elements.

== Sources and methods ==
Local history research uses many kinds of sources, such as government records, land and tax files, newspapers, maps, photos, buildings, oral histories, family papers, and community traditions. Historians compare nearby communities and track change over time in local institutions, economies, and social relations, often using both numbers, like census data, and stories to study patterns in work, migration, and politics.

Local history, like public history, does not focus on one topic, because a historian can write local labor history, local women’s history, local business history, or local religious history. Instead, the field centers on professional and ethical questions about who local history serves, where people can find it, and how historians work with a community whose members are both neighbors and subjects. These questions include what local history can do and how historians can build relationships that reveal overlooked sources and help their work matter in the community.

== Uses ==
Local history supports school curricula, lifelong learning, and community-based projects that use historical materials to explore identity and place. Exhibitions, walking tours, public talks, and digital resources make research accessible to residents and visitors.

Local history also informs planning and preservation decisions, heritage tourism, and discussions of commemoration and public memory. It can provide a setting for dialogue in communities that face contested histories by highlighting shared experiences and multiple viewpoints.

== Local contexts ==
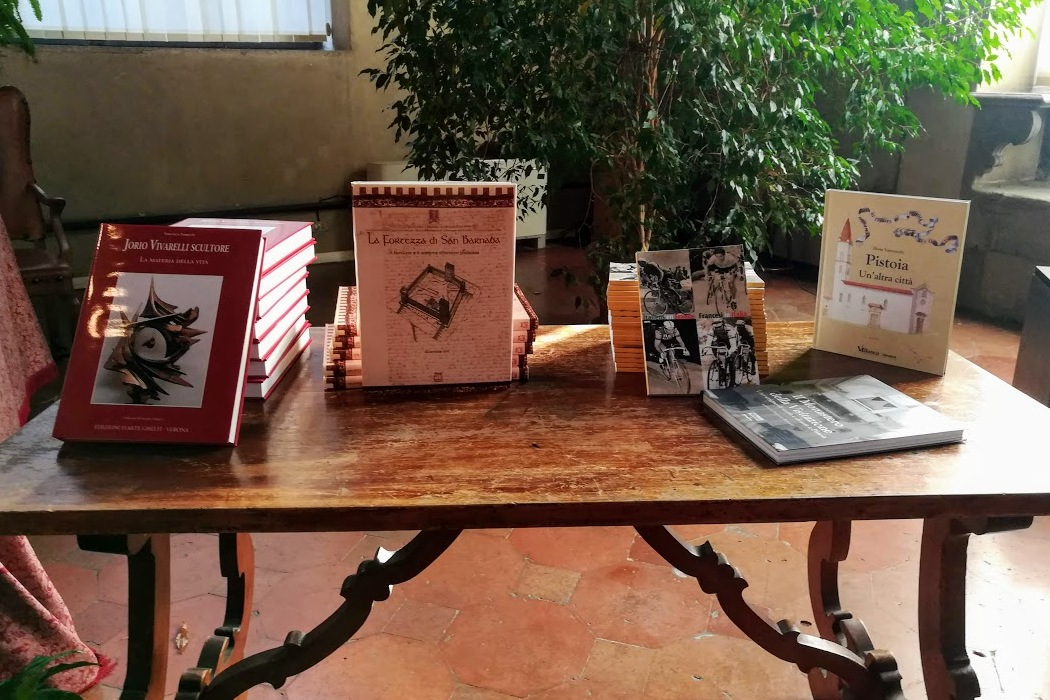
Examples of local history books about people and monuments in the province of Pistoia

Local history tends to be less documented than other types, with fewer books and artifacts than that of a country or continent. Many local histories are recorded as oral tales or stories and so are more vulnerable than more well known issues. Artifacts of local history are often collected in local history museums, which may be housed in a historic house or other building. Individual historic sites are inherently local, although they may have national or world history importance as well. Many however have little overall historical impact but add depth to the local area.

=== Australia ===
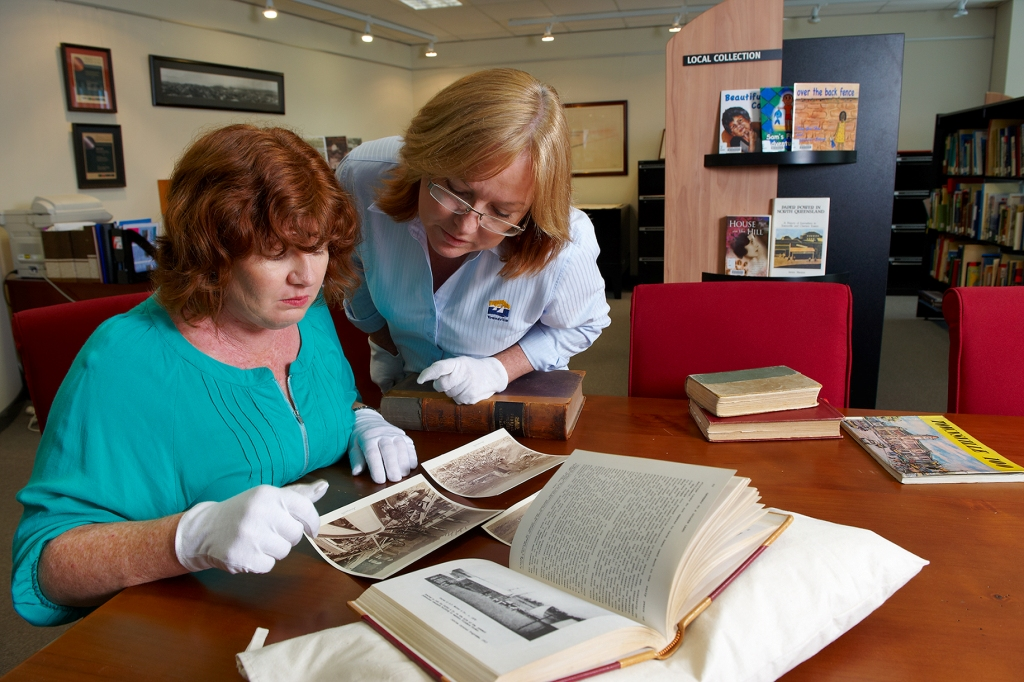
Viewing resources in the local history collection, Townsville, Queensland, Australia

In Australia, local history is focussed on specific cities and suburbs or country towns and regions. In cities, local history might concentrate on a CBD and its bordering suburbs, on a specific suburb or municipality, or on an agglomeration of suburbs and municipalities (because local government boundaries have changed over time). Outside the larger cities, local history often examines regional towns and surrounding areas.

Records are typically stored at state libraries, public libraries, historical societies and public record offices. For example, the State Library of Victoria holds extensive local history records for Melbourne and other places in Victoria. Many other Melbourne libraries have local history collections, along with the Public Record Office Victoria and the Royal Historical Society of Victoria. In New South Wales, the Royal Australian Historical Society has studied local history as part of its remit since its founding in 1901. It holds local history records along with the State Library of NSW and other state and local libraries and archives.

Historians have examined the ways local history has been written in Australia since the nineteenth century. Early on, the emphasis was on pioneer and settler history. The creative ways that local history contributed to making community has also been argued. Subsequently, local history, urban history, public history and heritage were closely connected in Australia.

=== United Kingdom ===
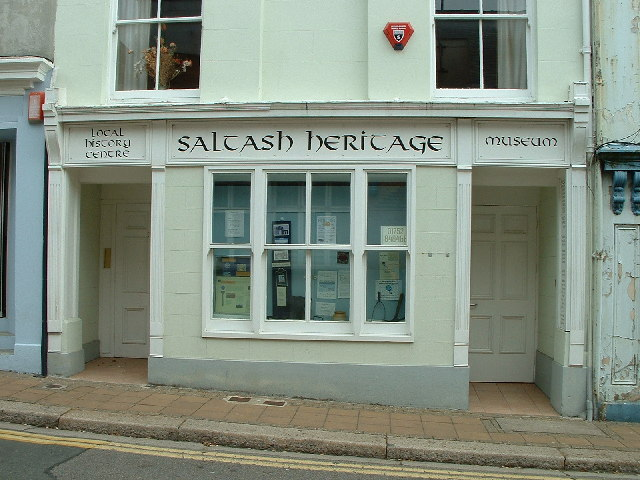
Saltash Museum & Local History Centre, Cornwall, UK

The British Association for Local History in the United Kingdom encourages and assists in the study of local history as an academic discipline and as a leisure activity by both individuals and groups. Most historic counties in England have record societies and archaeological and historical societies which coordinate the work of historians and other researchers concerned with that area.

Local history in the UK took a long time to be accepted as an academic discipline. In the 18th and 19th centuries, it was widely regarded as an antiquarian pursuit, suitable for country parsons. The Victoria History of the Counties of England project began in 1899 in honour of Queen Victoria with the aim of creating an encyclopaedic history of each of the historic counties of England. The project is coordinated by the Institute of Historical Research at the University of London. The first academic post related to local history was at Reading University which appointed a research fellow in local history in 1908. There was a department of local history (but without a professor) at Leicester University from 1947. H. P. R. Finberg was the first Professor of English Local History. He was appointed by Leicester in 1964. Local history continues to be neglected as an academic subject within universities. Academic local historians are often found within a more general department of history or in continuing education.

Local history is rarely taught as a separate subject in British schools. In 1908, a Board of Education circular had urged that schools should pay attention "to the history of the town and district" in which they were situated. In 1952, the Ministry of Education suggested schools should use local material to illustrate national themes. Within the current National Curriculum, pupils at level 4 are expected to "show their knowledge and understanding of local, national and international history".

The Alan Ball Local History Awards were established in the 1980s to recognize outstanding contributions in local history publishing in the UK (both in print and in new media), and to encourage the publishing of such works by public libraries and local authorities.

Local history can become a crucial component to policy-making and serve as a marketable resource and this is demonstrated in the case of Northern Ireland. Aside from its contribution to local development, local history is being used as a non-contentious meeting ground in addressing conflicting traditions by reinforcing shared past rather than adversarial political history.

=== United States ===
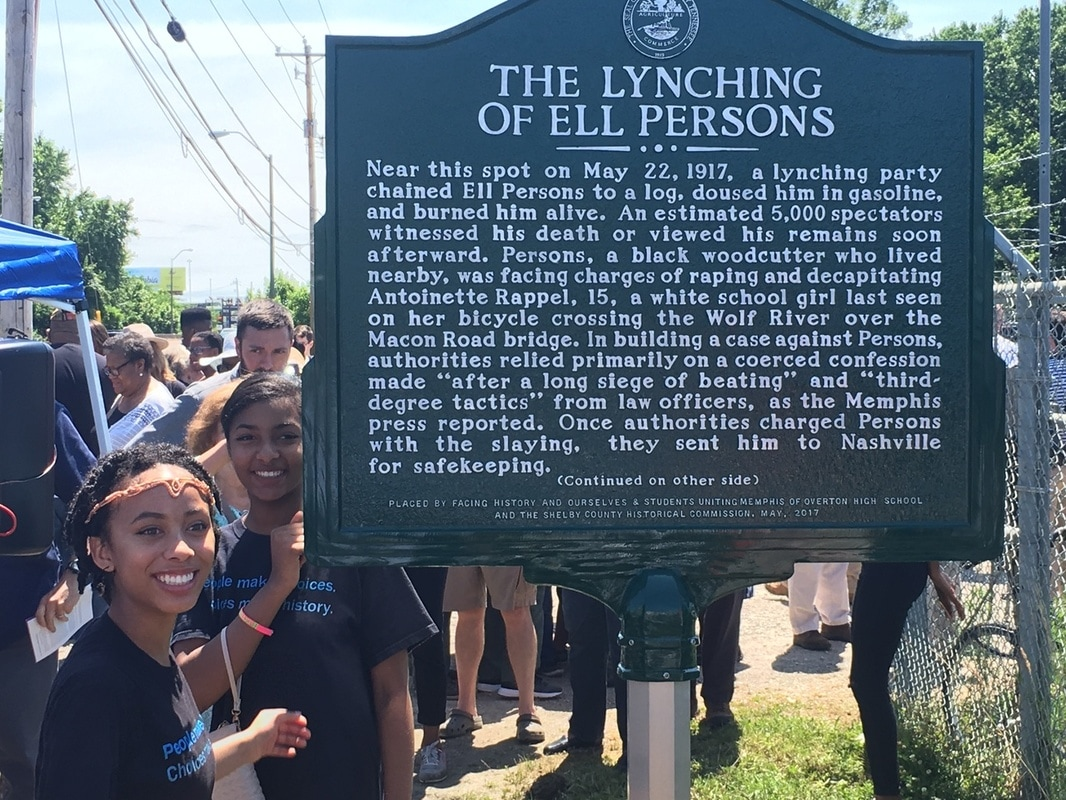
Dedication of the Ell Persons historical marker in Memphis, Tennessee

Local history in the United States examines the history of specific geographic areas, including regions, states, counties, cities, towns, and neighborhoods. The field became visible in American academic life in the 1970s, though non-academic historians had engaged in documenting local histories since the nineteenth century. Early works focused on settlement, the experiences of settlers, and the displacement of Native Americans. They often described political events, wars, and the contributions of local communities to national developments. Local history in the United States connects the experiences of communities to the broader national narrative. It explores how local responses to national and international events shape the country’s development. The interplay between localism and nationalism has influenced federal-state relations, sectionalism, and regionalism. Many pivotal events in American history are best understood through the lens of local responses to shared issues.

Preservation and Organizations

By the early twentieth century, local historians began to focus on preserving primary materials and oral histories, recognizing the risk of losing irreplaceable records and memories. Historical societies and individual historians collected documents, artifacts, and oral accounts to safeguard community heritage. The American Association for State and Local History, established in 1940, supports the preservation and interpretation of local history across the country.

Methodology and Trends

In the late twentieth century, the field expanded to include more diverse voices and topics, influenced by social and political movements. Community studies and place-oriented research became common, allowing historians to test generalizations about the national experience through local case studies.

=== Slavic countries ===
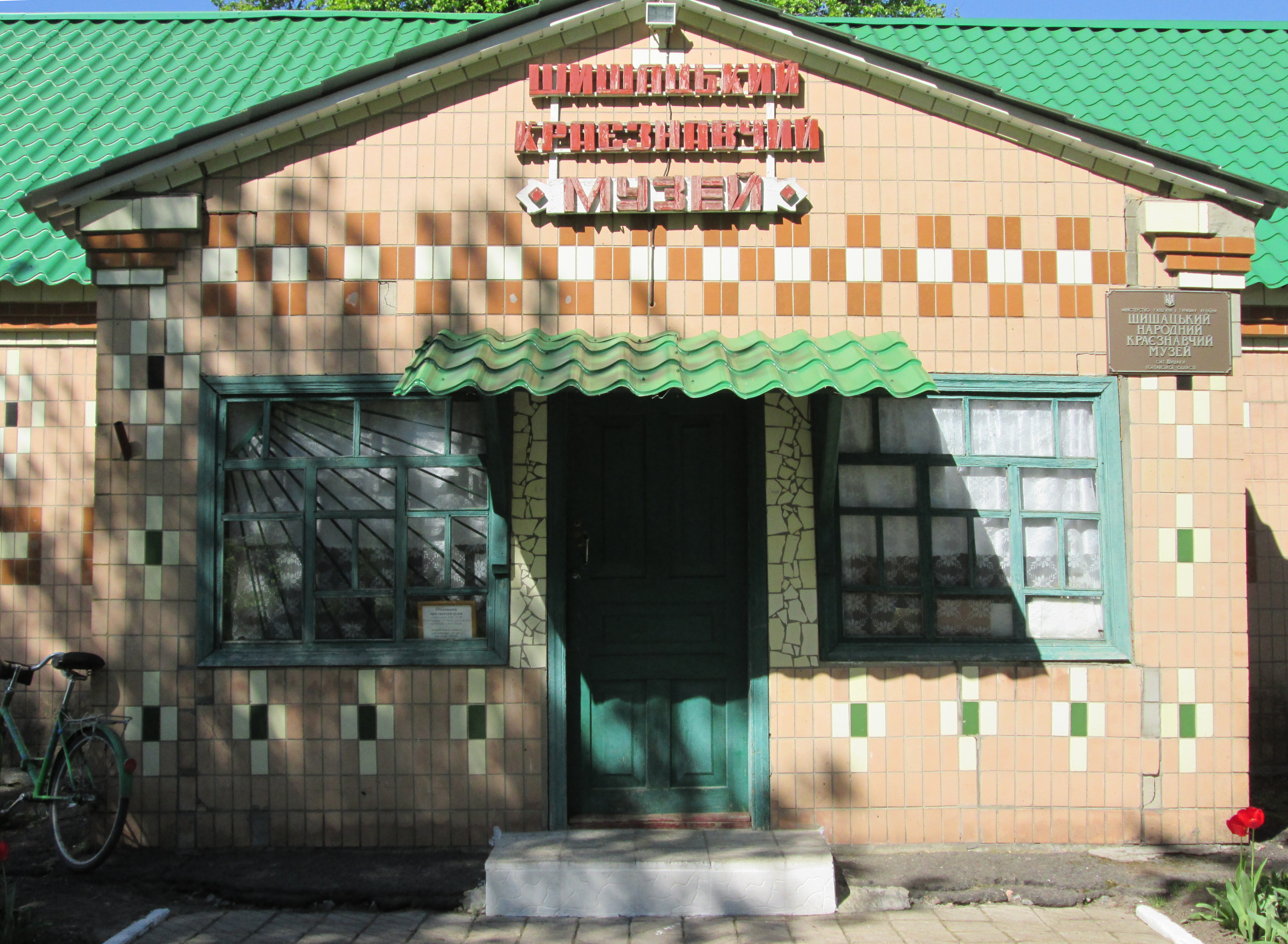
Shyshaky Museum of Local Lore

In several Slavic countries there is a related study which may be translated from the local languages as "country lore" or "local lore". In addition to history, it also incorporates other local studies, such as local geography, nature, and ethnography.

In Russia local lore is known as krayevedenie (ru:Краеведение). It is taught in primary schools. There are also local lore museums known as krayevedcheskie muzei. In modern Russia the concept of "regional studies" (ru:Регионоведение) is also considered.

In Ukraine, the study of local history and regional ethnography is known as krayeznavstvo (uk:краєзнавство). The National Union of Local Lore Researchers of Ukraine is a professional society for researchers of ethnology and local studies in Ukraine. It was founded in 1925 and has 3,000 members in 17 chapters. The society has published its journal Краєзнавство since 1927.

In Poland, the corresponding concept is called touring (pl:Krajoznawstwo), the term known since 1902. In modern Poland various organized krajoznawstwo activities are carried out by Polskie Towarzystwo Turystyczno-Krajoznawcze, roughly translated as "Polish Tourist and Sightseeing Society".

=== Belgium ===
The study of local history in Belgium began with the creation of learned societies. After Belgium became independent in 1830, people developed a stronger sense of national and regional identity. This feeling led to the founding of groups such as circles, academies, and associations focused on local history. These organizations aimed to study the history of specific places and to protect both physical objects and cultural traditions from the past. Learned societies played a key role in researching, recording, and preserving the local history and heritage of communities across Belgium.

== See also ==
- Chorography
- English local history
- Family history
- Historic preservation
- Local museum
- Microhistory
- One-place study
- Rural history
- American urban history
- Local heritage book
