= Eaves Wood =

Protected area in Lancashire, England

Coordinates: 54°10′41″N 2°49′37″W

Eaves Wood is a Site of Special Scientific Interest (SSSI) within the Arnside and Silverdale National Landscape in Lancashire, England. It is located 1 km north of Silverdale. This protected area includes King Williams Hill where there is a monument marking the Golden Jubilee of Queen Victoria's accession to the throne, known as the 'Pepperpot'. This woodland is protected because of the plant species found there and because the red squirrel is found in this woodland.

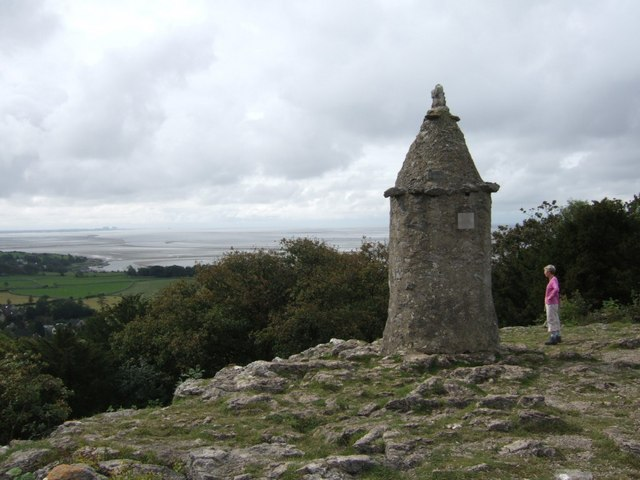
The Pepper Pot

== Biology ==
The dominant trees in this woodland are ash and hazel. Other tree species present include sessile oak, small leaved lime, wild service tree and lancashire whitebeam. More than 250 species of fungi have been recorded in this woodland. Herb species include yellow star of Bethlehem, yellow bird's nest and dark red helleborine. The herb spring cinquefoil has been recorded in woodland clearings.

The insect Issus muscaeformis has been recorded in this protected area.

== Geology ==
The underlying geology at Eaves Wood is Carboniferous limestone and there are some areas of limestone pavement in this protected area.

== Land ownership ==
Most of the land in Eaves Wood SSSI is owned by the National Trust.
