= Arnside Knott =

Hill in Cumbria, England

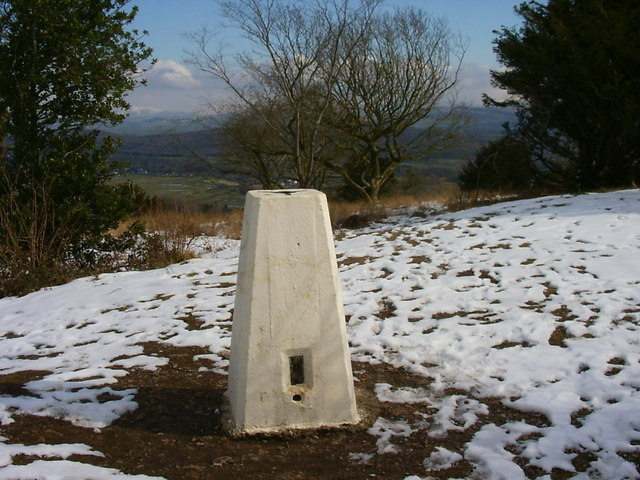
- Arnside Knott Trig Point

Highest point
- Elevation: 159 m (522 ft)
- Prominence: 150 m (492 ft)
- Parent peak: Hutton Roof Crags
- Listing: Marilyn, HuMP
- Coordinates: 54.1902°N 2.8351°W

Geography
- Location: Cumbria, England
- Parent range: Lake District Far Eastern Fells
- OS grid: SD456775

Arnside Knott is a hill with a summit elevation of 159 metres (522 ft), near Arnside, Cumbria, England. It is not in the Lake District National Park, lying south of the River Kent which forms the south eastern boundary of the national park. It is within the Arnside and Silverdale National Landscape (formerly Area of Outstanding Natural Beauty or AONB), and is National Trust property.

Arnside Knott is the lowest Marilyn (i.e. a hill with at least 150 m of topographic prominence) in England. It was not included in Alan Dawson's The Relative Hills of Britain (1992: ISBN 1-85284-068-4) which was the first listing of Marilyns and showed the lowest one as the Hebridean island of Muldoanich, but was added to the list in 2004–05. A detailed survey of the summit and the col was made in 2010, confirming their heights as 159.1 m (522 ft) +/-0.1 m (3.9 in) and 8.3 m (27 ft) +/-0.4 m (1 ft 4 in) respectively, giving a prominence of 150.8 m (495 ft) +/-0.4 m (1 ft 4 in) and confirming the hill's status as a Marilyn. The col is a point on the railway line east of Silverdale, the further north of two pedestrian railway crossings near Waterslack.

Arnside Knott has been described as "one of the best sites in Britain to see butterflies", and rare species found there include the high brown fritillary and the Scotch argus.

On the north slopes of the hill the now defunct Arnside Golf Club had a golf course from 1906 to the time of World War 2.
