= British Association for Local History =

British Association for Local History logo

The British Association for Local History (BALH) is a membership organisation that exists to promote the advancement of public education through the study of local history and to encourage and assist the study of local history throughout Great Britain as an academic discipline and as a leisure activity.

== Foundation ==
BALH was founded and registered as a charity in England and Wales on 30 September 1982 through an initiative by the National Council of Social Services (now the National Council for Voluntary Organisations) to bring together the work of previously separate organisations in the field. It aims to be the national umbrella organisation for the subject and many local history societies and groups are members of BALH, though others remain outside. People with an interest in local history can also join BALH as individual members.

== Activities ==
BALH's activities include the publication of the quarterly journal The Local Historian (first published in 1952), a quarterly magazine Local History News, a quarterly e-newsletter, as well as a number of books and pamphlets on the topic. It also organises an annual lecture, national and regional conferences and guided visits to libraries, museums and institutions such as The National Archives and the College of Arms. The Association also coordinates an annual Local History Day.

The British Association for Local History also has an education committee that has been active in lobbying the National Curriculum Council to increase the teaching of local history in schools, as well as in preparing courses and publications for teachers.

== Officers ==
The Association's president is Professor Caroline Barron of Royal Holloway, University of London. The announcement of her appointment was made at the Association's Local History Day in June 2016. She succeeded David Hey as President, who died in February 2016.

== See also ==
- Alan Ball Local History Awards
- Geographical Association
