= Dean =

Dean may refer to:

== People ==
- Dean (given name)
- Dean (surname), a surname of Anglo-Saxon English origin
- Dean (South Korean singer), a stage name for singer Kwon Hyuk
- Dean Delannoit, a Belgian singer most known by the mononym Dean
- Dean Swift, a sobriquet for Jonathan Swift

== Titles ==
- Dean (Christianity), persons in certain positions of authority within a religious hierarchy
- Dean (education), persons in certain positions of authority in some educational establishments
- Dean of the Diplomatic Corps, most senior ambassador in a country's diplomatic corps
- Dean of the House, the most senior member of a country's legislature

== Places ==
- Dean, Victoria, Australia
- Dean, Nova Scotia, Canada
- De'an County, Jiujiang, Jiangxi, China

=== United Kingdom ===
- Dean, Bedfordshire
- Dean, Cumbria
- Dean, Lynton and Lynemouth, a location in Devon
- Dean, Trentishoe, a location
- Dean, Dorset, a location
- Dean, Bishops Waltham, a location in Hampshire
- Dean, Sparsholt, a location in Hampshire
- Dean, Lancashire, a location
- Dean, Oxfordshire
- Dean, Somerset, a hamlet in Cranmore
- Dean Village, Edinburgh
- Forest of Dean, Gloucestershire
- Dene (valley), common toponym in England, often rendered 'dean' in place names

=== United States ===
- Dean, Iowa, an unincorporated community
- Dean, Nevada, ghost town
- Dean, Pennsylvania, a borough
- Dean, Texas, a city

== Other ==
- Dean (film), a 2016 American film starring Demetri Martin
- Dean College, a private college in Franklin, Massachusetts
- Dean Foods, a dairy processor in Dallas, Texas
- Dean Guitars, American manufacturer of guitars and other stringed instruments
- Dean number, a dimensionless group in fluid mechanics, which occurs in the study of flow in curved pipes and channels
- Dean Trust, a group of schools in Manchester, England and the surrounding area
- Beast of Dean, a legendary creature said to live in the Forest of Dean, England
- Hurricane Dean, 2007 Atlantic hurricane
- USS Dean II, a United States Navy patrol boat in commission from 1917 to 1918
- The Dean, a hotel in Providence, Rhode Island

== See also ==
- Deans (disambiguation)
- Deane (disambiguation)
