= List of United Kingdom locations: De-Dee =

The United Kingdom

This is part of the list of United Kingdom locations: a gazetteer of place names in the United Kingdom showing each place's locality and geographical coordinates.

== De ==
=== Dea-Dee ===
Location	Locality	Coordinates (links to map & photo sources)	OS grid reference
Deacon's Hill	Hertfordshire	51.64°N 00.28°W	TQ1995
Deadman's Cross	Bedfordshire	52.05°N 00.38°W	TL1141
Deadman's Green	Staffordshire	52.93°N 01.95°W	SK0337
Deadwater	Hampshire	51.10°N 00.85°W	SU8035
Deaf Hill	Durham	54.71°N 01.41°W	NZ3836
Deal	Kent	51.21°N 01.39°E	TR3752
Dean	City of Edinburgh	55.95°N 03.21°W	NT2474
Dean	Cumbria	54.61°N 03.44°W	NY0725
Dean	Dorset	50.93°N 02.04°W	ST9715
Dean (Trentishoe)	Devon	51.18°N 03.97°W	SS6245
Dean (Lynton)	Devon	51.21°N 03.86°W	SS7048
Dean (Sparsholt)	Hampshire	51.07°N 01.37°W	SU4431
Dean (Bishops Waltham)	Hampshire	50.96°N 01.20°W	SU5619
Dean	Lancashire	53.72°N 02.22°W	SD8525
Dean	Oxfordshire	51.89°N 01.50°W	SP3422
Dean Bank	Durham	54.68°N 01.56°W	NZ2832
Dean Court	Oxfordshire	51.74°N 01.32°W	SP4705
Dean Cross	Devon	51.15°N 04.14°W	SS5042
Deane	Bolton	53.55°N 02.48°W	SD6807
Deane	Hampshire	51.24°N 01.22°W	SU5450
Deanend	Dorset	50.95°N 02.04°W	ST9717
Dean Head	Barnsley	53.49°N 01.60°W	SE2600
Deanland	Dorset	50.96°N 02.01°W	ST9918
Deanlane End	West Sussex	50.90°N 00.94°W	SU7412
Dean Lane Head	Bradford	53.80°N 01.86°W	SE0934
Dean Park	Renfrewshire	55.86°N 04.38°W	NS5166
Dean Prior	Devon	50.45°N 03.80°W	SX7263
Dean Row	Cheshire	53.32°N 02.21°W	SJ8681
Deans	West Lothian	55.89°N 03.56°W	NT0268
Deans Bottom	Kent	51.30°N 00.66°E	TQ8660
Deanscales	Cumbria	54.62°N 03.41°W	NY0926
Dean's Green	Warwickshire	52.31°N 01.81°W	SP1368
Deansgreen	Cheshire	53.36°N 02.46°W	SJ6985
Deanshanger	Northamptonshire	52.04°N 00.89°W	SP7639
Deans Hill	Kent	51.30°N 00.66°E	TQ8660
Deanston	Stirling	56.18°N 04.08°W	NN7101
Dean Street	Kent	51.24°N 00.49°E	TQ7452
Dearham	Cumbria	54.71°N 03.44°W	NY0736
Dearnley	Rochdale	53.63°N 02.12°W	SD9215
Deasker	Western Isles	57.56°N 07.61°W	NF643667
Debdale	Manchester	53.46°N 02.16°W	SJ8996
Debden (Epping Forest)	Essex	51.65°N 00.08°E	TQ4496
Debden (Uttlesford)	Essex	51.98°N 00.27°E	TL5634
Debden Green (Uttlesford)	Essex	51.96°N 00.28°E	TL5732
Debden Green (Epping Forest)	Essex	51.66°N 00.06°E	TQ4398
De Beauvoir Town	Hackney	51.53°N 00.08°W	TQ3384
Debenham	Suffolk	52.22°N 01.17°E	TM1763
Deblin's Green	Worcestershire	52.13°N 02.27°W	SO8149
Dechmont	West Lothian	55.91°N 03.53°W	NT0470
Deckham	Gateshead	54.94°N 01.59°W	NZ2661
Deddington	Oxfordshire	51.97°N 01.33°W	SP4631
Dedham	Essex	51.95°N 00.98°E	TM0533
Dedham Heath	Essex	51.93°N 00.99°E	TM0631
Dedridge	West Lothian	55.87°N 03.50°W	NT0666
Dedworth	Berkshire	51.47°N 00.64°W	SU9476
Deebank	Aberdeenshire	57.04°N 02.51°W	NO6995
Deene	Northamptonshire	52.51°N 00.61°W	SP9492
Deenethorpe	Northamptonshire	52.50°N 00.60°W	SP9591
Deepcar	Sheffield	53.46°N 01.57°W	SK2897
Deepclough	Derbyshire	53.47°N 01.94°W	SK0497
Deepcut	Surrey	51.30°N 00.71°W	SU9057
Deepdale	Bedfordshire	52.12°N 00.24°W	TL2049
Deepdale	North Yorkshire	54.20°N 02.17°W	SD8979
Deepdene	Surrey	51.22°N 00.32°W	TQ1749
Deepfields	Dudley	52.54°N 02.08°W	SO9494
Deeping Gate	Cambridgeshire	52.66°N 00.31°W	TF1409
Deeping St James	Lincolnshire	52.66°N 00.30°W	TF1509
Deeping St Nicholas	Lincolnshire	52.71°N 00.20°W	TF2115
Deepthwaite	Cumbria	54.24°N 02.75°W	SD5183
Deepweir	Monmouthshire	51.57°N 02.75°W	ST4887
Deerhurst	Gloucestershire	51.95°N 02.19°W	SO8729
Deerhurst Walton	Gloucestershire	51.95°N 02.17°W	SO8828
Deerland	Pembrokeshire	51.75°N 04.92°W	SM9810
Deerness	Orkney Islands	58.94°N 02.75°W	HY568061
Deer's Green	Essex	51.95°N 00.12°E	TL4631
Deerstones	North Yorkshire	53.97°N 01.87°W	SE0853
Deerton Street	Kent	51.32°N 00.82°E	TQ9762

=== Def-Den ===
Location	Locality	Coordinates (links to map & photo sources)	OS grid reference
Defford	Worcestershire	52.08°N 02.13°W	SO9143
Defynnog	Powys	51.93°N 03.57°W	SN9227
Deganwy	Conwy	53.29°N 03.84°W	SH7779
Degar	The Vale Of Glamorgan	51.50°N 03.44°W	ST0079
Degibna	Cornwall	50.07°N 05.28°W	SW6525
Deighton	Kirklees	53.66°N 01.75°W	SE1619
Deighton	North Yorkshire	54.40°N 01.41°W	NZ3801
Deighton	York	53.88°N 01.05°W	SE6244
Deiniolen	Gwynedd	53.14°N 04.13°W	SH5763
Deishar	Highland	57.24°N 03.79°W	NH9219
Delabole	Cornwall	50.62°N 04.74°W	SX0684
Delamere	Cheshire	53.21°N 02.66°W	SJ5669
Dell	Highland	57.17°N 03.82°W	NH9011
Dell Quay	West Sussex	50.81°N 00.82°W	SU8302
Delly End	Oxfordshire	51.81°N 01.49°W	SP3513
Delnamer	Angus	56.79°N 03.34°W	NO1868
Delph	Oldham	53.56°N 02.03°W	SD9807
Delves	Durham	54.83°N 01.81°W	NZ1249
Delvin End	Essex	51.98°N 00.54°E	TL7535
Dembleby	Lincolnshire	52.92°N 00.45°W	TF0437
Demelza	Cornwall	50.43°N 04.86°W	SW9763
Denaby Main	Doncaster	53.48°N 01.26°W	SK4999
Denbeath	Fife	56.17°N 03.04°W	NT3598
Denbigh (Dinbych)	Denbighshire	53.18°N 03.42°W	SJ0566
Denbury	Devon	50.49°N 03.66°W	SX8268
Denby	Derbyshire	53.01°N 01.42°W	SK3946
Denby Bottles	Derbyshire	53.01°N 01.43°W	SK3846
Denby Common	Derbyshire	53.01°N 01.39°W	SK4147
Denby Dale	Kirklees	53.56°N 01.66°W	SE2208
Denchworth	Oxfordshire	51.61°N 01.45°W	SU3891
Dendron	Cumbria	54.12°N 03.16°W	SD2470
Dene Park	Kent	51.22°N 00.27°E	TQ5950
Deneside	Durham	54.82°N 01.36°W	NZ4148
Denford	Northamptonshire	52.37°N 00.54°W	SP9976
Denford	Staffordshire	53.07°N 02.07°W	SJ9553
Dengie	Essex	51.67°N 00.86°E	TL9801
Denham (Mid Suffolk)	Suffolk	52.32°N 01.21°E	TM1974
Denham (St Edmundsbury)	Suffolk	52.21°N 00.56°E	TL7561
Denham (Quainton)	Buckinghamshire	51.87°N 00.91°W	SP7520
Denham (parish)	Buckinghamshire	51.56°N 00.50°W	TQ0486
Denham Corner	Suffolk	52.30°N 01.21°E	TM1972
Denham End	Suffolk	52.22°N 00.57°E	TL7662
Denham Green	Buckinghamshire	51.58°N 00.51°W	TQ0388
Denhead	Fife	56.30°N 02.87°W	NO4613
Denhead	Aberdeenshire	57.36°N 02.01°W	NJ9930
Denhead of Gray	City of Dundee	56.46°N 03.07°W	NO3431
Denholm	Scottish Borders	55.45°N 02.69°W	NT5618
Denholme	Bradford	53.80°N 01.91°W	SE0634
Denholme Clough	Bradford	53.78°N 01.89°W	SE0732
Denholme Edge	Bradford	53.80°N 01.91°W	SE0634
Denholme Gate	Bradford	53.78°N 01.89°W	SE0732
Denholmhill	Scottish Borders	55.43°N 02.69°W	NT5616
Denio	Gwynedd	52.88°N 04.42°W	SH3735
Denmead	Hampshire	50.89°N 01.07°W	SU6511
Denmore	City of Aberdeen	57.19°N 02.10°W	NJ9411
Dennington	Suffolk	52.25°N 01.33°E	TM2867
Dennington Corner	Suffolk	52.23°N 01.33°E	TM2865
Dennington Hall	Suffolk	52.26°N 01.35°E	TM2968
Dennis Head	Orkney Islands	59.38°N 02.38°W	HY783559
Dennistoun	City of Glasgow	55.85°N 04.23°W	NS6065
Denny	Falkirk	56.01°N 03.92°W	NS8082
Denny Bottom	Kent	51.12°N 00.22°E	TQ5639
Denny End	Cambridgeshire	52.26°N 00.18°E	TL4965
Dennyloanhead	Falkirk	55.99°N 03.92°W	NS8080
Dennystown	West Dunbartonshire	55.94°N 04.57°W	NS3975
Den of Lindores	Fife	56.34°N 03.21°W	NO2517
Denshaw	Oldham	53.58°N 02.04°W	SD9710
Denside	Aberdeenshire	57.04°N 02.33°W	NO8095
Densole	Kent	51.12°N 01.15°E	TR2141
Denston	Suffolk	52.13°N 00.57°E	TL7652
Denstone	Staffordshire	52.95°N 01.86°W	SK0940
Denstroude	Kent	51.30°N 01.01°E	TR1061
Dent	Cumbria	54.26°N 02.46°W	SD7086
Dent Bank	Durham	54.62°N 02.10°W	NY9326
Denton	Cambridgeshire	52.46°N 00.32°W	TL1487
Denton	Darlington	54.55°N 01.67°W	NZ2118
Denton	East Sussex	50.79°N 00.05°E	TQ4502
Denton	Lincolnshire	52.87°N 00.72°W	SK8632
Denton	Norfolk	52.44°N 01.33°E	TM2788
Denton	Northamptonshire	52.21°N 00.78°W	SP8358
Denton	North Yorkshire	53.92°N 01.78°W	SE1448
Denton	Oxfordshire	51.71°N 01.14°W	SP5902
Denton	Kent	51.17°N 01.16°E	TR2147
Denton	Tameside	53.45°N 02.12°W	SJ9295
Denton Burn	Newcastle upon Tyne	54.97°N 01.70°W	NZ1965
Denton Holme	Cumbria	54.87°N 02.93°W	NY4054
Denton's Green	St Helens	53.45°N 02.76°W	SJ4996
Denver	Norfolk	52.58°N 00.37°E	TF6101
Denvilles	Hampshire	50.84°N 00.97°W	SU7206
Denwick	Northumberland	55.42°N 01.68°W	NU2014
