= Deans =

Deans may refer to:

== People ==
- Austen Deans (1915–2011), New Zealand painter and war artist; grandfather of Julia Deans
- Bob Deans (1884–1908), New Zealand rugby union player; grandson of John and Jane Deans
- Bruce Deans (1960–2019), New Zealand rugby union player; brother of Robbie Deans
- Colin Deans (born 1955), Scottish rugby union player
- Craig Deans (born 1974), Australian football (soccer) player
- Diane Deans (1958–2024), Canadian politician
- Dixie Deans (1946–2025), Scottish football player (Celtic)
- Ian Deans (1937–2016), Canadian politician
- Jane Deans (1823–1911), New Zealand pioneer and community leader; wife of John Deans
- John Deans (1820–1854), New Zealand pioneer, husband of Jane Deans and brother of William Deans
- Julia Deans (born 1974), New Zealand singer-songwriter; granddaughter of Austen Deans
- Kathryn Deans, Australian author
- Louise Deans, New Zealand Anglican priest
- Mickey Deans (1934–2003), fifth and last husband of Judy Garland
- Ray Deans (born 1966), Scottish football player
- Robbie Deans (born 1959), New Zealand rugby coach and former player; brother of Bruce Deans
- Tommy Deans (1922–2000), Scottish football (soccer) player
- William Deans (1817–1851), New Zealand pioneer; brother of John Deans

== Places ==
- Deans, New Jersey
- Deans, West Lothian

== See also ==
- Dean (disambiguation)
