= Lancaster Park =

Park in Christchurch, New Zealand

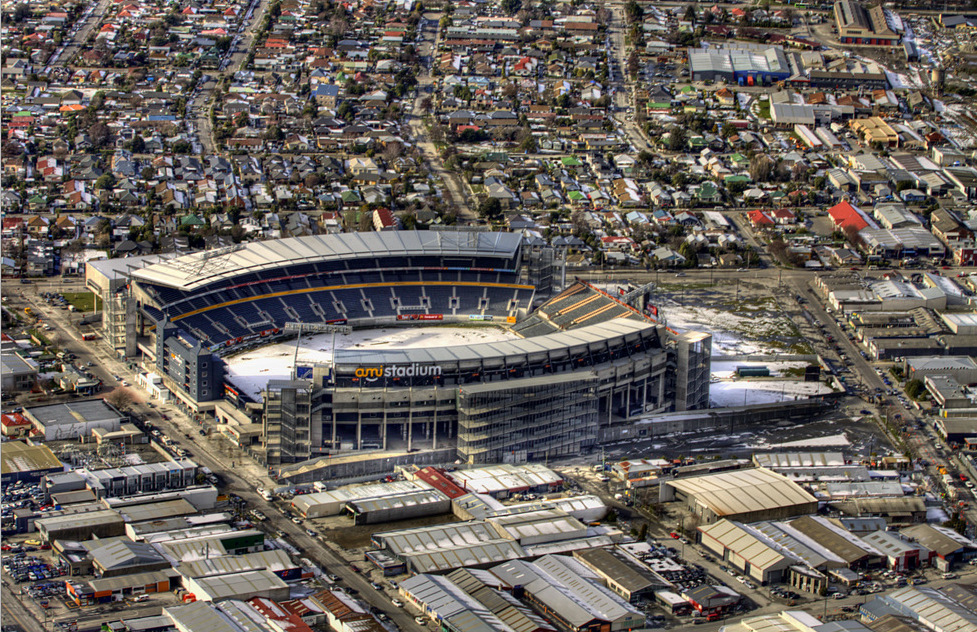
- 2011 aerial view of earthquake-damaged Lancaster Park
- Interactive map of Lancaster Park
- Former names: Jade Stadium (1998–2007); AMI Stadium (2007–2011)
- Location: Christchurch, New Zealand
- Coordinates: 43°32′31″S 172°39′15″E
- Owner: Victoria Park Trust
- Operator: VBase Venue management
- Capacity: 38,628
- Surface: Grass
- Field size: Cricket Oval

Construction
- Groundbreaking: 1880
- Opened: 1881
- Renovated: 1995–2009
- Expanded: 2009
- Closed: 2011
- Demolished: 2012–2019

Tenants
- Crusaders (Super Rugby) (1996–2011); Canterbury (ITM Cup)

Ground information
- End names
- Hadlee Stand End; Port Hills End

International information
- First men's Test: 10–13 January 1930: New Zealand v England
- Last men's Test: 7–9 December 2006: New Zealand v Sri Lanka
- First men's ODI: 11 February 1973: New Zealand v Pakistan
- Last men's ODI: 29 January 2011: New Zealand v Pakistan
- First men's T20I: 7 February 2008: New Zealand v England
- Last men's T20I: 30 December 2010: New Zealand v Pakistan
- First women's Test: 16–18 February 1935: New Zealand v England
- Last women's Test: 29 November – 2 December 1957: New Zealand v England
- First women's ODI: 7 February 1982: Australia v England
- Last women's ODI: 15 February 1999: New Zealand v South Africa
- Only women's T20I: 28 February 2010: New Zealand v Australia
- As of 29 January 2011; Source: ESPNcricinfo

Lancaster Park is a public recreational park with facilities for community sport in Waltham, a suburb of Christchurch in New Zealand. It was re-opened in June 2022. The facilities at the park were previously known as Jade Stadium and AMI Stadium due to commercial naming rights, and they were used as a sports stadium. The AMI stadium closed permanently due to damage sustained in the February 2011 earthquake and was demolished in 2019.

Previously the stadium was the venue for various sports including rugby union, cricket, rugby league, association football, athletics and trotting. It is perhaps best known for being the track where Peter Snell broke the world record for 800 metres and for 880 yards in a single race in 1962. It had also hosted various non-sporting events including concerts by Pearl Jam in 2009, Bon Jovi in 2008, Roger Waters in 2007, Meat Loaf in 2004, U2 in 1989 & 1993, Tina Turner in 1993 and 1997, Dire Straits in 1986 and 1991, and Billy Joel in 1987. However the stadium was primarily a rugby and cricket ground and was the home of the Crusaders rugby union team, who compete in Super Rugby, and the Canterbury cricket team. Its capacity was 38,628.

== History ==
=== Ownership ===
In 1880 Canterbury Cricket and Athletics Sports Co. Ltd was established. In 1882, Edward Stevens and Arthur Ollivier, as agents through their company, Harman and Stevens, arranged the purchase of a parcel of swampy farmland which became Lancaster Park. (The actual cricket ground was in low-lying area and sat on a large pool of saturated land.) Benjamin Lancaster, a farmer, was the absentee vendor. Canterbury Cricket and Athletics Sports purchased 10 acres 3 rods 30 perches (4.426 hectares) for £2,841 at £260 per acre (NZ$ 1284.95/hectare). In 1904 Canterbury cricket would become the sole owner of the ground. Then in 1911 the Canterbury Rugby Union became co-owners with the Canterbury Cricket Association over the ground. An Act of Parliament in November 1919 vested title to Lancaster Park in the Crown, and established the Victory Park Board to take responsibility for its management.

JADE Stadium Limited was established in December 1998 to manage the existing facilities on behalf of the Victory Park Board and the Christchurch City Council. A five-member board of directors, drawn from Christchurch's business community and the Christchurch City Council, governed the company.

=== Official opening ===
In 1881 the first cricket match to be played on the ground was scheduled for the opening on 8 October, but it was cancelled because of rain. An athletics meeting became the first event held on the ground, on 15 October.

=== Protests ===
The final game of ex-All Black Fergie McCormick was played at Lancaster Park in Christchurch on 28 March 1976. Two Springbok players had been invited but ten days before the game, protesters had written "WELCOME TO RACIST GAME" in 20-foot high letters on the pitch using weed-killer which was very visible to the television audience and the crowd. In a futile bid, ground staff attempted to use turf to adjust the "sign" to read "WELCOME TO GAME". Other protests were held at the park, notably during the 1981 Springbok tour.

=== Financial difficulty ===
In 1912 a "Floral Fete", a festival, was held to raise funds to clear the debt of £2,000 in order to prevent the ground being cut up into building sites.

The financial difficulty the ground faced was so great that during New Zealand's involvement in World War I in 1915 the main oval at Lancaster Park was ploughed up and was used as a potato field in an attempt to raise more revenue.

=== Expansion ===
The embankment was expanded in 1957, increasing the capacity to 33,000. Two new stands were opened in 1965 further increasing the capacity to 38,500. In 1995 the Hadlee Stand opened in tribute to the successful cricketing family which came from Canterbury. The Hadlee stand was the first stand to be demolished due to earthquake damage. In 2000 saw the demolition of the embankment and No. 4 stand and the opening of the DB Draught stand (renamed the Tui stand in 2006) and the Paul Kelly Motor Company Stand (West Stand). Both stands sustained severe slump damage during the earthquake in 2011. Although deemed repairable it is unlikely they will be as the cost would be too expensive.

As part of a $60 million redevelopment for the 2011 Rugby World Cup, the Eastern Stands (No. 1, 2 and 3 stands) were demolished and replaced with the new Deans Stand. The Stand was designed to reflect the newly completed Western Stand. The total capacity was 38,500 and was to be raised to nearly 45,000 with temporary seating for the 2011 Rugby World Cup, in what would have made it the second largest stadium in New Zealand after Eden Park.

=== Deans Stand ===
On Tuesday, 22 April 2008 a press release was issued announcing that the new East Stand, built to replace stands demolished in 2007, as part of a redevelopment of the Ground, was to be named the Deans Stand when it was officially opened in January 2010. The Deans Stand had a seating capacity of 13,000. The stand was severely damaged in the earthquake when the piles it stood on were violently forced up and then down in a wave motion. It was slated for demolition.

The Deans name has been a part of rugby at the stadium for more than a century. Bob Deans was an All Black and also captained the Canterbury rugby team, Bruce and Robbie Deans were both All Blacks and members of the Canterbury team with Robbie also coaching the Crusaders, Bob's brother Colin played rugby at the ground, Bruce & Robbie's father Tony played cricket on the ground, and in the sixth generation of the family Milly Deans is a member of the Canterbury women's rugby team. The name Deans is also the family name of the first successful settlers in the city with brothers John and William Deans building their house in 1843.

=== Earthquake damage ===
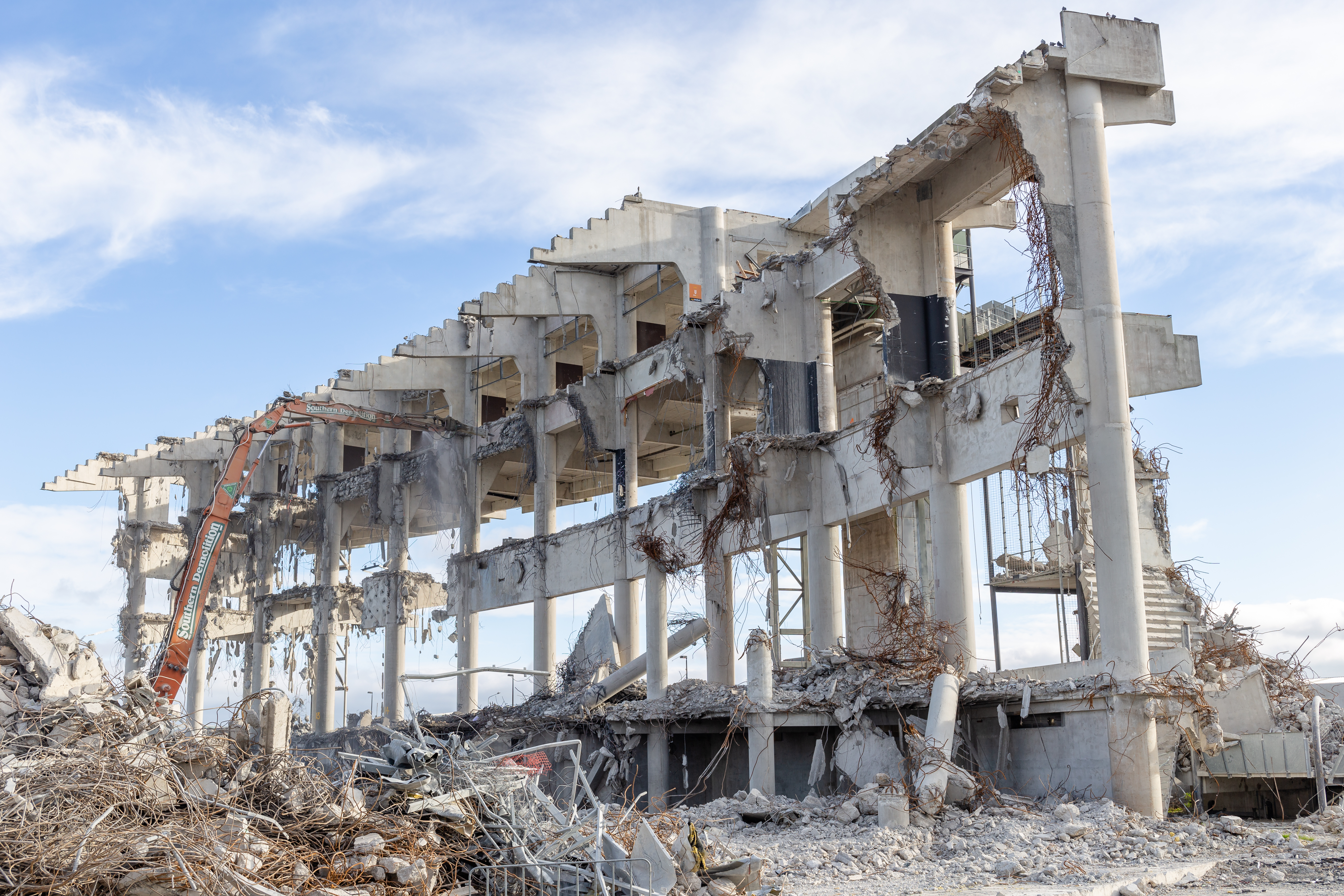
Lancaster Park during demolition in August 2019

The stadium was closed because of the severe damage sustained during the February 2011 Christchurch earthquake. Seven 2011 Rugby World Cup matches scheduled for the stadium in September were moved to other venues. Demolition of the stadium was largely completed by September 2019. In 2025, the new stadium named Te Kaha is proposed to be finished for games within Christchurch's Four Avenues inner city boundary. In the meantime, games would be played in the site of Rugby League Park.

=== Re-opening ===
The park was re-opened in June 2022 as a public recreational park with sporting facilities including fields for cricket, rugby, touch rugby and association football. In February 2025, the Christchurch City Council announced that a community centre and changing rooms were under construction at the northeastern part of the park, with construction scheduled to be completed in October. Lancaster Park Cricket Club and Ōtautahi Rugby Club were involved in the planning.

== Naming ==
Formerly known as Lancaster Park, the stadium was renamed Jade Stadium in 1998, after the naming rights were sold to Jade Software Corporation Limited. In 2007, the naming rights were sold to AMI Insurance Limited and the stadium was renamed AMI Stadium. The park on which the stadium stands has always been called Lancaster Park, so the formal name for the venue was "AMI Stadium at Lancaster Park".

== Davis Cup (tennis) ==
The 1911 Davis Cup was played at Lancaster Park, where Australasia as the defending champion was challenged by the United States. Rain delayed the beginning of the games scheduled for 29 December 1911, and the 1911 Davis Cup event was held between 1 and 3 January 1912. Australian Norman Brookes beat Beals Wright in the opening match. Rodney Heath increased the lead for Australasia by beating William Larned. Australasia retained the Davis Cup through a win in the doubles, with Brookes and Alf Dunlop being successful over Wright and Maurice E. McLoughlin. The fourth match was defaulted by Wright, and Larned stepped aside to give the younger McLoughlin the opportunity to play Brookes. McLoughlin led 2 sets to 1, but Brookes came back and won the match, and gave Australasia a clean 5–0 victory.

== Rugby union ==
The venue hosted 48 All Blacks test matches from 1913 to 2010.

=== 2011 Rugby World Cup ===
The Stadium was scheduled to host five pool matches and two quarter finals at the 2011 Rugby World Cup and would be referred to as Stadium Christchurch owing to the IRB's advertising rules at venues for the Rugby World Cup. Owing to damage suffered from the earthquake that hit Christchurch and surrounding areas on 22 February 2011, Christchurch lost its rights to host the seven world cup games as the city was too damaged to host.

=== Super Rugby ===
AMI Stadium was home to the Crusaders Super Rugby franchise. They have hosted four Super 12/Super 14 finals in 2002, 2005, 2006 and in 2008. Due to damage AMI Stadium sustained in the 2011 Christchurch earthquake, the Crusaders moved to Rugby League Park in Addington, renamed Christchurch AMI STADIUM to be used as their home ground for the foreseeable future. The ground has been rebuilt to 18,600pax. Despite AMI claiming massive expenses, they still were able to buy naming rights to Crusaders temporary stadium. In the recent years, it has been renamed to Orange Theory Stadium.

=== NPC/ITM Cup ===
The stadium was home to the Canterbury team in the ITM Cup (now the Bunnings National Provincial Championship). The team moved to Rugby Park for the 2011 season but joined their fellow Crusaders franchise at the new AMI STADIUM, the former League ground in Addington for the 2012 season.

=== Ranfurly Shield ===
Canterbury have a notable Ranfurly Shield history. One significant moment was when they retained the Ranfurly Shield against Waikato in 1954 with a last minute try. The conversion was never taken as the crowd rushed the field before the game could be completed.

== Cricket ==
Cricket has long been played at Lancaster Park, which was built as a cricket ground. It staged the first Test in New Zealand on 10 January 1930, which was also the first Test played by New Zealand, in the 1929–30 series against England. Day/night cricket was made possible after the lighting towers were added in 1996—the first in a major New Zealand stadium. These were first put to use in 1997 when New Zealand played England in front of a crowd of 25,000. It was the ground where Richard Hadlee picked up the most 5-wicket hauls in New Zealand, his second century (151* against Sri Lanka) and his 400th Test wicket and where Nathan Astle scored 222 against England in a losing effort, including the fastest double-century in Test cricket. Brendon McCullum scored the fastest Twenty20 century against Australia at Lancaster Park, and a one-day-match fundraiser for Boxing Day Tsunami relief was held there in 2005, New Zealand against a World XI.

Because of the February 2011 Christchurch earthquake, and the liquefaction of the ground, One Day Internationals could not be played in the city until the upgrade of the Hagley Oval in preparation for the 2015 ICC Cricket World Cup as this was the only ground that had the capacity to host them. First-class matches have been moved to Rangiora Recreation Ground and Hagley Oval in Christchurch.

== Rugby league ==
Lancaster Park has hosted matches for a number of clubs from the Australasian National Rugby League competition. The Wests Tigers and Sydney Roosters, who are both based in Sydney, have hosted matches at the ground. The 2011 ANZAC rugby league Test match was originally scheduled to be played at the stadium but was moved to the Robina Stadium on Australia's Gold Coast because of the damage from the 2011 Canterbury earthquake.

=== Rugby league test matches ===
Lancaster Park has hosted three New Zealand rugby league internationals since 1920.

Date	Opponent	Result	Attendance	Part of
7 August 1920	England	3–19	10,000	1920 Great Britain Lions tour
1 November 1996	Great Britain	32–12	9,000	1996 Great Britain Lions tour
28 October 2006	Great Britain	18–14	17,005	2006 Rugby League Tri-Nations

== Soccer ==
Lancaster Park hosted an A-League match between Wellington Phoenix and Adelaide United on 30 January 2010. The match attracted 19,276 which was, at the time, a record home league attendance for the Wellington team, prompting suggestions Christchurch may be able to sustain an A-League team of its own.

In the next A-League season the stadium was used again, for the same opponents encounter on 5 December 2010. A 14,108 crowd was the season-best record for Phoenix.

== Concerts ==
Lancaster Park has hosted a number of concerts including U2 (1989 & 1993), Tina Turner (1993 & 1997), Dire Straits (1986 & 1991), Billy Joel (1987), Meat Loaf (2004), Roger Waters (2007), Bon Jovi (2008) and Pearl Jam (2009).

== Religious events ==
In 1954 Lancaster Park held a Roman Catholic prayer rally drawing a large crowd. Pope John Paul II also held a public mass on the oval in 1986, attracting about 25,000 people.

== See also ==
- List of Test cricket grounds
