= Deane =

Deane may refer to:

== Places ==
- Deane, Greater Manchester, an area of Bolton and a former historic parish
- Deane, Hampshire, a village
- Deane, Kentucky

== Ships ==
- USS Deane (1778), US Navy frigate named after Silas Deane
- HMS Deane (K551), a 1943 British Royal Navy frigate which served in the Second World War

== See also ==
- Deane (name), for people with the name Deane
- Dean (surname)
- Dean (disambiguation)
- Tribes of Galway, which includes Deane as one of the Tribes
