= USS Dean =

USS Dean may refer to:

- USS Deane (1778), a Continental Navy frigate in commission from 1778 to 1783, renamed USS Hague in 1782
- USS Dean II (SP-98), a United States Navy patrol boat in commission from 1917 to 1918
