= Catherine Dean =

Catherine Dean may refer to:

- Catherine Dean (artist) (1905–1983), British artist and educator
- Catherine Dean May, U.S. Representative from Washington

== See also ==
- Kathryn Deans, Australian author
- Dean (surname)
