= Lamb Corner =

Hamlet in Essex, England

Coordinates: 51.9452°N 0.9755°E

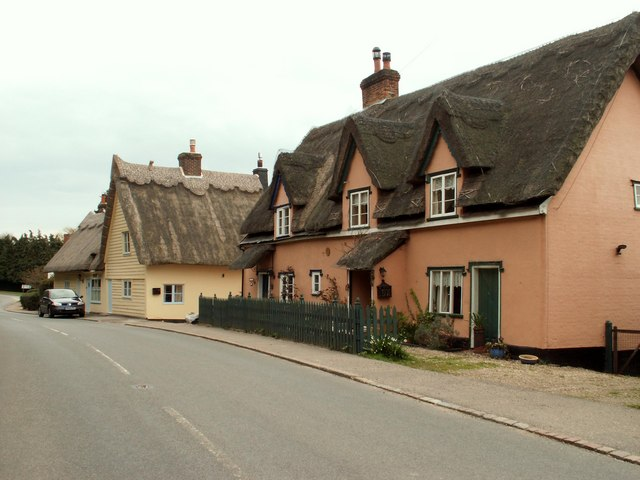
- Thatched cottages at Lamb Corner

- Location within Essex
- Civil parish: Dedham
- District: Colchester
- Shire county: Essex
- Region: East
- Country: England
- Sovereign state: United Kingdom
- Police: Essex
- Fire: Essex
- Ambulance: East of England

Lamb Corner is a hamlet on the B1029 road, in the civil parish of Dedham in the Colchester district, in the county of Essex, England. Lamb Corner is a collection of houses around the Black Brook dating from the medieval period to the 21st century. Lamb Corner had a pub called the Lamb Inn which closed in 1998 and is now a house called "Lamb House". The building is a grade II listed building.
