= Hawk Stone =

Neolithic standing stone in Oxfordshire, England

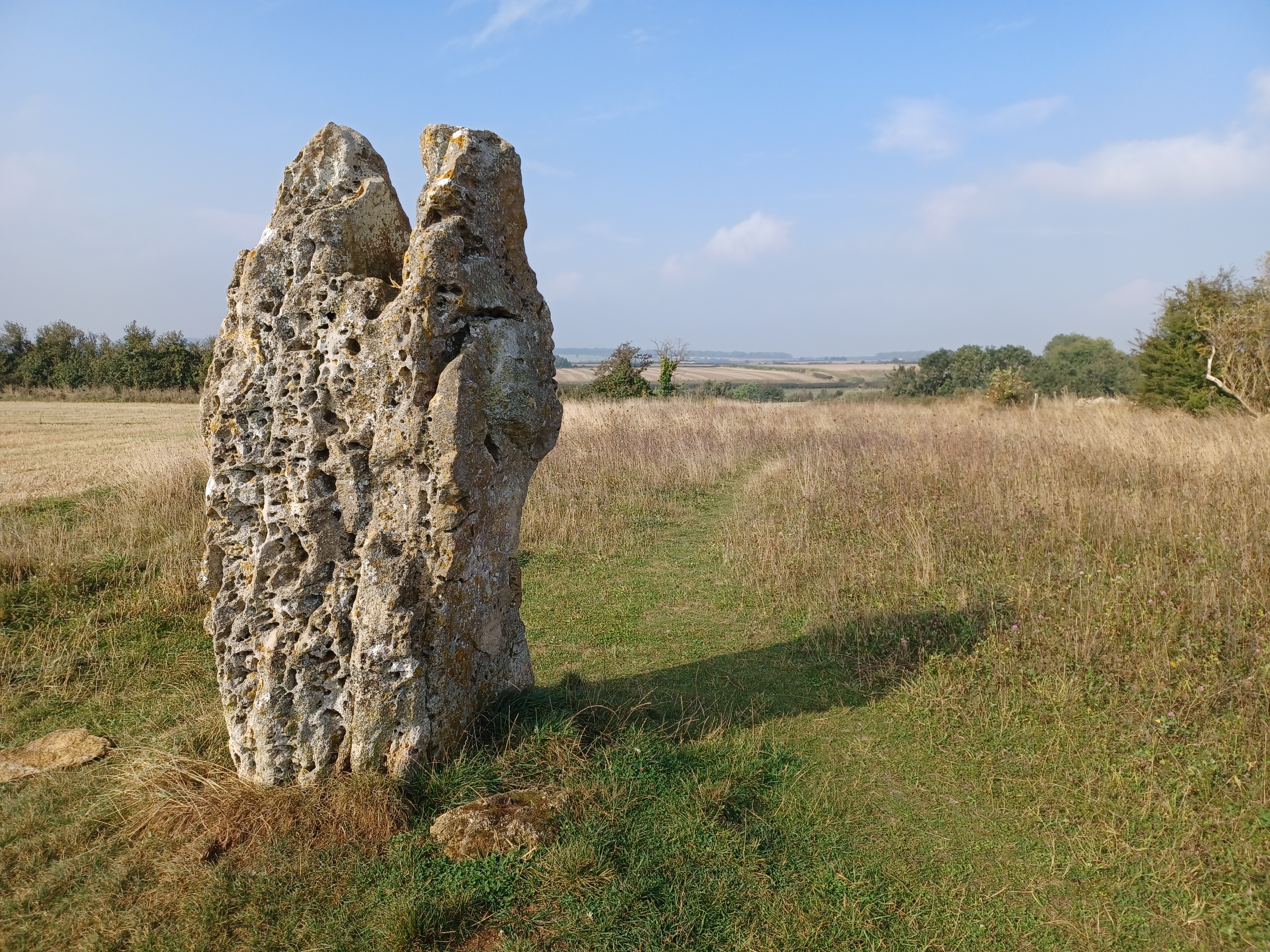

- Location within Oxfordshire
- 51.90901°N 1.50861°W
- Type: Standing stone
- Periods: Neolithic
- Location: Dean, Oxfordshire

The Hawk Stone is a Neolithic standing stone just north of the hamlet of Dean, Oxfordshire, England.

== Name ==
The name either derives from its shape, being like a hawk, or is a corruption of the word 'hoar' meaning 'old'.

== Description ==
The Hawk Stone stands on Spelsbury Down, 900 metres west of Spelsburydown Farm. The stone stands to a height of 2.6 metres, and it has a width of approximately 1 metre by 0.9 metres at its base and tapers to 0.9 metres at the apex. It is made from oolitic limestone.

It has been argued that the stone was once part of a larger burial chamber, although there is little evidence to support this. A concave hollow in its upper face is known to have been worn over time by people rubbing the stone for luck, although it may originally have been natural in origin.

== In legend ==
Local tradition has it that the cleft in the top of the stone was made by the chains of witches who were tied to the stone and burnt alive.

== Hawkstone Lager ==
The stone stands near Diddly Squat Farm belonging to broadcaster Jeremy Clarkson, specifically the fields used to grow barley. The barley from these fields is used by Clarkson and the Hawkstone Brewery to make Hawkstone Lager, which was launched in 2022 and named after the stone.
