= Maison Talbooth, Dedham =

Historic 19th century residence in Essex, England

Coordinates: 51.9672°N 0.9808°E

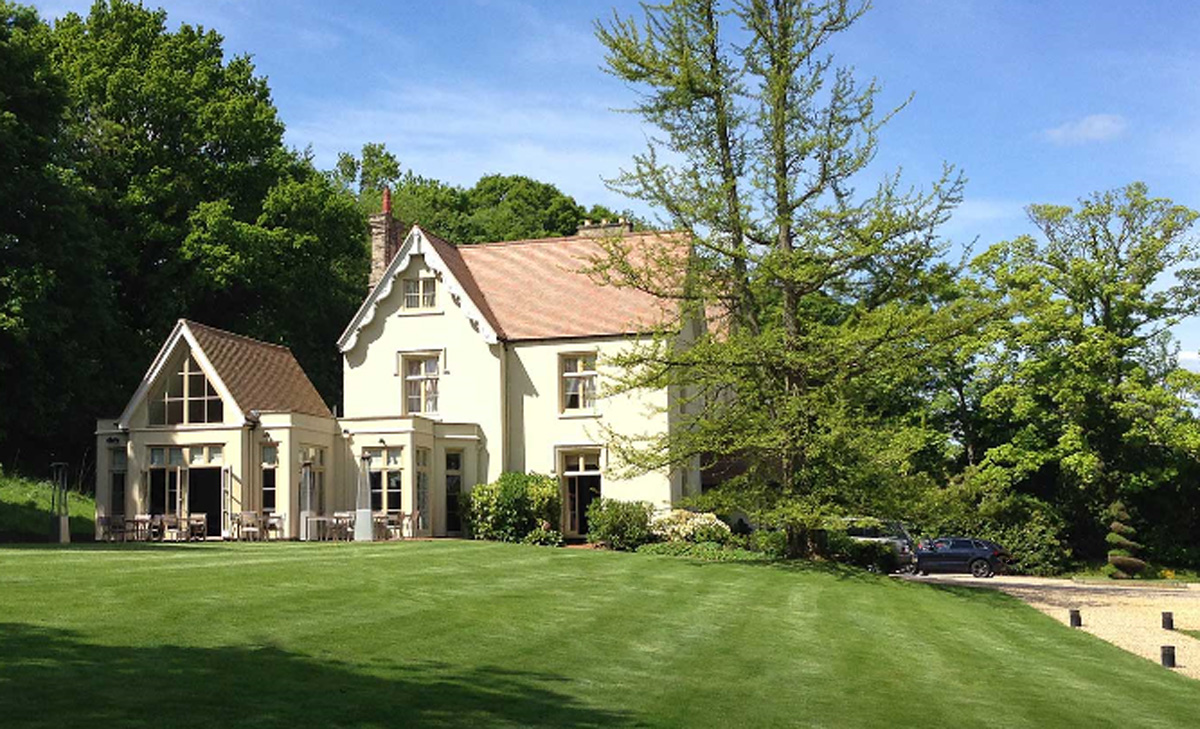
Maison Talbooth

Maison Talbooth, Dedham in Essex is a building of historical significance. The construction was started in 1846 and completed by 1850. The architect was John Brown from Norwich who has been described as the most successful Norwich architect of the early 19th century. It was the home of many notable residents over the next century and in 1969 was converted into a hotel. It still serves this function today providing accommodation and restaurant facilities.

== Early history ==
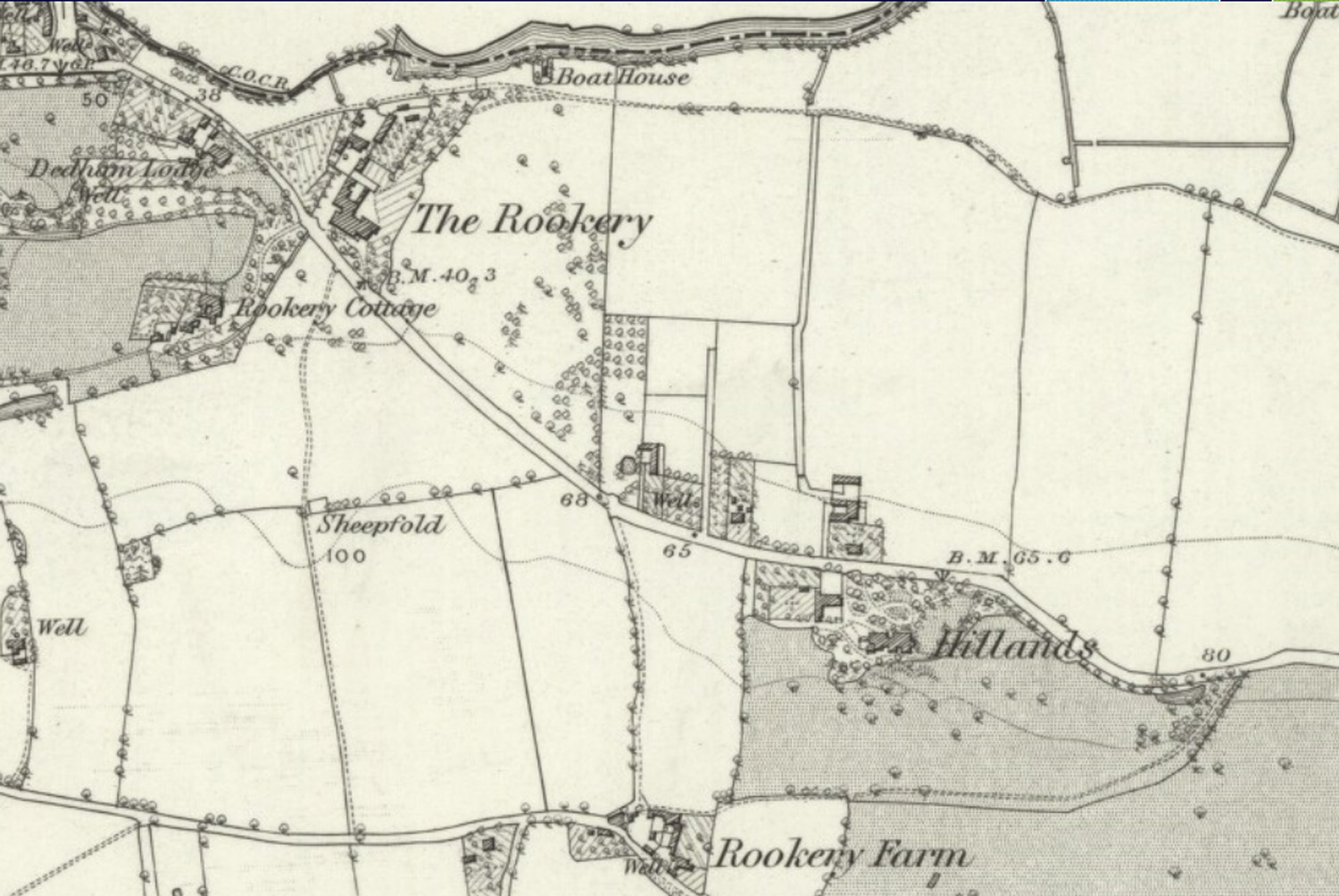
Map of Dedham in 1875 showing the Maison Talbooth which was then called Hillands

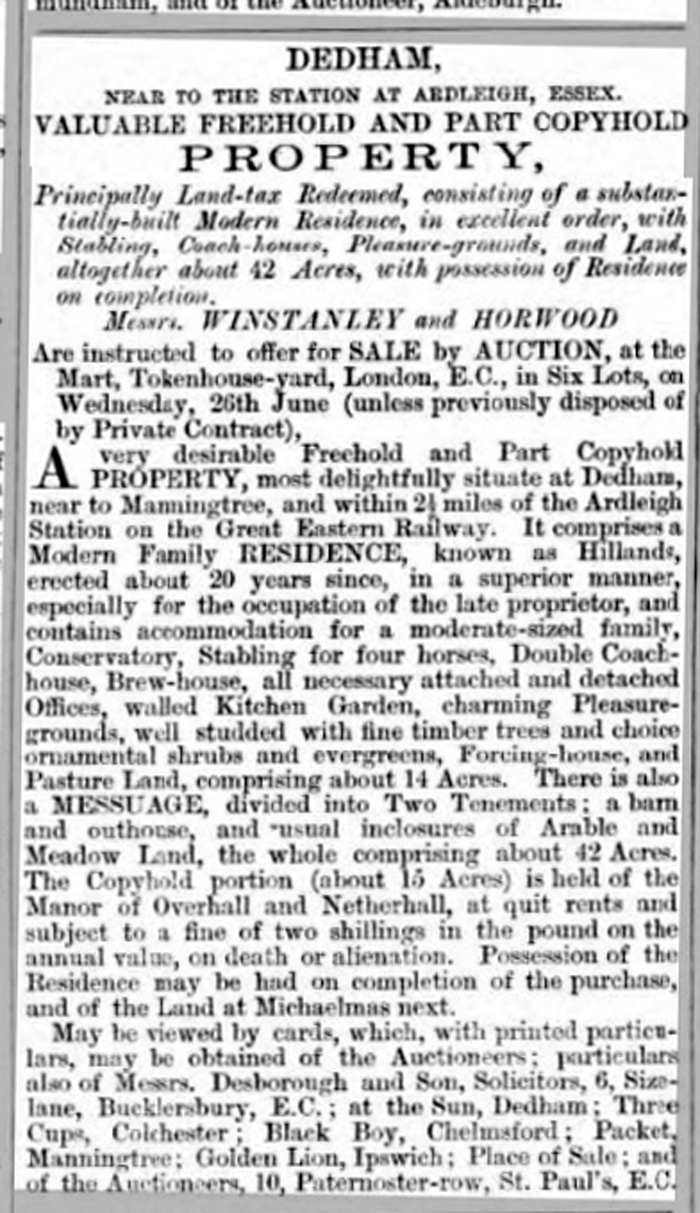
Ad for sale in 1867

Caroline L'Estrange Collyer (1789–1866) built Maison Talbooth (then called Hillands) in about 1850. She commissioned the notable architect from Norwich, John Brown, to undertake the construction. Caroline was born in 1789 in Norwich, Norfolk. Her father was Thomas Glover Ewen (1747–1813) who was a wealthy landowner who lived in Norwich. Her brother was Thomas L'Estrange Ewen. In 1817 she married the Reverend Edward Collyer who was the only son of Charles Collyer owner of Gunthorpe Hall (which still exists). This family is listed in the book on the gentry called "visitation of England and Wales. The couple had only one child Louisa Maria Collyer and unfortunately at the age of only 37 Edward died leaving Caroline a widow with one daughter. She erected a memorial in his honour at Gunthorpe Church which can be seen here

Soon after his death she moved to Dedham and lived in a house at the site of Maison Talbooth in Stratford Road. This house is marked on a 1790 map of Dedham. Her brother Thomas L'Estrange Ewen had bought the Rookery, which is in the same street, several years before so it is likely that she wished to live near him. In the 1830s she and her daughter Louisa spent some time travelling as they were frequently mentioned in the social pages called "Fashionable Arrivals".

In 1842 Louisa married the local lawyer Thomas John Barstow and the couple had a large family. Possibly with the thought of accommodating them Caroline decided to build a new house in 1846. The 1851 and 1861 Census shows all of them living at the house with many servants. In 1866 at the age of 77 Caroline died and in the following year the house was put on the market. The advertisement for the sale is shown.

The house was bought by Henry Richard Edwards (1830–1906) who lived there with his wife Mary and children for the next twenty years. He was a landowner who had previously worked as a fund broker. He left to live in Southwold in about 1888 and the house was advertised for sale.

== Later history ==
James Dyer Tremlett (1836–1918), a barrister, lived at the property with his wife Louisa and daughter Beatrice until about 1894 and then moved to Dalthorpe in Dedham where he remained until his death in 1918. Elizabeth Duckworth (1844–1908), a widow and her daughters rented the house between 1899 and 1907.

In 1907 Dr James Richard Lownds (1861–1943) who was a physician and surgeon bought the house. The 1911 Census shows him living there with his wife Martha Louisa and two daughters. The house was put on the market for sale in 1922.

Arthur George Aldous (1867–1942) bought the property. He is described in the book "Armorial Families" as being "a gentleman". In 1902 he married Alice Maude Mackenzie Young who was the daughter of a very wealthy banker and pastoralist from Australia. The couple had one daughter. This family lived at the house for over 20 years. Arthur died in 1942 and the house was advertised for sale. Between then and 1969 there were several residents including Arnold Bellamy Beddow and Charles William Seely
