= Roger A. Freeman =

British military historian (1928–2005)

Roger A. Freeman (11 May 1928 – 7 October 2005) was a British military aviation historian specialising in US Eighth Air Force operations during World War II. Osprey described him as "undoubtedly the most published author on the Eighth Air Force,"

== Early life ==
Born in Ipswich, Suffolk, Freeman grew up on the family farm in Dedham, Essex. In 1943, Martin B-26 Marauder bombers of the US Eighth Air Force’s 386th Bomb Group arrived at Boxted airfield – less than two miles away – sparking Freeman's interest with the wartime US Army Air Forces operating from Britain. When his father was granted permission to cut the airfield’s grass for haymaking, the young Freeman made the most of opportunities to examine the aircraft and befriend personnel on the base – later tenants of which included the 354th Fighter Group of the Ninth Air Force; and the Eighth Air Force’s 56th Fighter Group which, flying Republic P-47 Thunderbolts, became the highest-scoring USAAF group in the European theatre.

The teenage Freeman also took bicycle rides to see other airfields in the East Anglian counties of Essex, Cambridgeshire, Suffolk and Norfolk, and collated aircraft identification numbers – a hobby that once led to a security alert and a warning from his headmaster at Colchester High School.

== Works ==
Freeman recalled a sight in February 1945, the sheer scale of which set him on a course to writing a book about the US Eighth Air Force. "It was a freezing morning with excellent visibility. Two columns of bombers were going out, one overhead [Dedham] and the other over Suffolk, which I could see by the contrails. I counted 28 formations, and knew there’d be about 40 planes in each. So I was looking at more than 1,000 planes – 10,000 men – going to war." Formed in 1942, the Eighth Air Force could muster more than 3,000 bombers and fighters by 1944, and operated from some 60 airfields in what Freeman called the "greater East Anglia area" of Britain.

After the war, Freeman continued to work for his father and began writing about agriculture for local publications including the Essex County Standard. He also wrote articles for aviation magazines and started to collate material for his planned book. Much of this included official documents sourced from the United States as well as personal accounts and photographs from USAAF veterans. Taking over the family farm in 1959, it would be another 11 years before Freeman could finish his book, a task in which he was assisted by his wife, Jean, whom he married in 1956.

In 1970, just before the book began its first print-run in the US, the publishers asked if Freeman would change its long title to something more succinct. He decided on The Mighty Eighth, a term widely used since and even adopted by the post-war US Eighth Air Force during its association with Strategic Air Command. The book was a success and has been translated into several languages. Freeman followed it up with a series of titles under the same banner, including The Mighty Eighth War Diary, The Mighty Eighth War Manual and the Mighty Eighth in Colour. His overall output of some 60 books also included works about the wartime Royal Air Force, individual aircraft studies, airfield histories and profiles of USAAF units – including the Boxted-based 56th Fighter Group of Freeman's youth. Aside from aviation, he also wrote books in the rural dialect local to the Dedham area, including I Mind the Time: Country Goings-on and That Were Like This Here.

The original Mighty Eighth book helped to galvanise veterans' groups in the US and led to Freeman's appointment as historian and symposium moderator of the Eighth Air Force Historical Society. He was also a consultant for the National Museum of the Mighty Eighth Air Force near Savannah, Georgia, in the early 1990s. The museum's study department is called the 'Roger A. Freeman Eighth Air Force Research Center'. In 2012 the American Air Museum at the Imperial War Museum Duxford, Cambridgeshire was established after acquiring the bulk of Freeman's archive of research material, making the photographs available online at the crowd-sourced American Air Museum website. Meanwhile, his knowledge led to consultancy roles for many TV documentaries and the job of technical adviser for the 1989 David Puttnam/Catherine Wyler film Memphis Belle.

== Death ==
Freeman died of cancer in October 2005.

== Works ==
- The Mighty Eighth (A History of the Units, Men and Machines of the Us 8th Air Force), 1970
- The Mighty Eighth War Diary, 1981
- The Mighty Eighth War Manual, 1984
- The Mighty Eighth: Warpaint & Heraldry, 1998
- The Ninth Air Force in Colour
- B-24 Liberator at War
- The Royal Air Force of World War Two in Colour
- Thunderbolt : A Documentary History of the Republic P-47
- Raiding the Reich: The Allied Strategic Offensive in Europe
- Chocks Away! Recollections of World War II Airmen
- B-26 Marauder at War
- The Fight for the Skies: Allied Fighter Aircraft in Europe and North Africa, 1939-1945
- The U.S. Strategic Bomber
- Combat Profile, Mustang: The P-51 Merlin Mustang In World War 2
- Camouflage & Markings: United States Army Air Force, 1937-1945
- B-17G Flying Fortress In World War 2
- Airfields of the Eighth (Then And Now)
- 56th Fighter Group, 2000, Osprey Publishing (Aviation Elite Units No. 2)
