= Dean (education) =

Academic title

Dean is a title employed in academic administrations such as colleges or universities for a person with significant authority over a specific academic unit, over a specific area of concern, or both. In the United States and Canada, deans are usually university professors who serve as the heads of a university's academic divisions or constituent colleges. In the United States, the title of dean is sometimes used in private schools.

== Origin ==
A "dean" (Latin: decanus) was originally the head of a group of ten soldiers or monks. Eventually an ecclesiastical dean became the head of a group of canons or other religious groups.

When the universities grew out of the cathedral schools and monastic schools, the title of dean was used for officials with various administrative duties.

== Use ==
=== Bulgaria and Romania ===
In Bulgarian and Romanian universities, a dean is the head of a faculty, which may include several academic departments. The dean can appoint deputies, for example, a vice dean of university work or a vice dean of science activity.

=== Russia ===
In Russian universities, a dean (декан) is default name for the head of a faculty, which is the equivalent of a department. The administrative body of a faculty is called a "decanate" (деканат).

=== Canada ===
In a Canadian university or a college, a dean is typically the head of a faculty, which may include several academic departments. Typical positions include dean of arts, dean of engineering, dean of science and dean of business. Many universities also have a dean of graduate studies, responsible for work at the postgraduate level in all parts of the university.

The job description for deans at the University of Waterloo reads in part, "The dean of a faculty is primarily a university officer, serving in that capacity on the senate, appropriate major committees and on other university bodies. As university officer, the dean has the dual role of making independent judgments on total university matters and representing the particular faculty's policies and points of view. The dean should oversee the particular faculty's relations with other faculties to ensure that they are harmonious and serve the total university's objectives. The dean will report directly to the vice president, academic and provost."

There may be associate deans responsible to the dean for particular administrative functions. McGill University also uses the title of pro-dean to refer to the ad hoc officer responsible for administering a PhD thesis defence. They serve as the direct representative of the dean of graduate and postdoctoral studies and are responsible for the defence being handled in strict correspondence with the university regulations.

=== German-speaking countries ===
In German speaking countries the Dean ('Dekan') is the head of an academic unit on the secondary level of a university, in most cases a faculty. Each university has broad discretion in grouping individual subjects together to form faculties, in some cases this might lead to a relatively loose compound of self-administered departments with a comparably weak dean's role, in other cases faculties might be organised in a more centralised manner. The dean is usually always a senior professorial member of the faculty, elected by the faculty council. Deans are not appointed by the university leadership but are an expression of the faculty's right to academic self-administration.

A dean is aided by several pro-deans (Prodekan) who take over certain responsibilities of faculty administration and by an assistant dean (Dekanatsrat). The pro-deans are likewise elected professorial members of the faculty, while the assistant dean is usually a longterm administrative role with a strong academic background.

=== Britain and Ireland ===
In some universities in the United Kingdom the term dean is used for the head of a faculty, a collection of related academic departments. Examples include Dean of the Faculty of Arts and Humanities. Similar usage is found in Australia and New Zealand. Durham University has executive deans of the four faculties (including Durham University Business School). The head of department at Durham Law School is also titled dean.

In collegiate universities including Oxford, Cambridge, and Lancaster, each college may have a dean who is responsible for discipline. An interview with the dean as a result of misbehaviour is sometimes referred to as a being deaned. In many Oxford colleges, the dean is supported by one or more junior deans. These are typically postgraduate students who are required to reside on the college site, and in return receive free accommodation and meals in addition to a small stipend. Some colleges use the term assistant dean or sub-dean; Christ Church uses the term warden, in contrast with several other colleges where the Warden is the title used for the college's head. Each of Lancaster's colleges formerly had assistant deans, but the title now used is college community assistant.

The dean may also, or instead, be responsible for the running of the college chapel. At Queens' College, Cambridge, and Jesus College, Cambridge, for example, the posts of Dean of College and Dean of Chapel are separate; likewise at Trinity College Dublin, the posts of senior and junior deans (charged with the discipline of junior and senior members respectively) are distinct from the deans of residence (who organise worship in the college chapel). At Magdalen College, Oxford the chaplain is referred to as the Dean of Divinity, and is separate from the Discipline Dean and the Welfare Dean. At Oxford the dean of the cathedral is the head of Christ Church.

The dean of King's College London is an unusual role among British universities, in that the dean is an ordained minister, responsible for overseeing the spiritual development and welfare of all students and staff, as well as fostering vocations among the worshiping community.

=== United States ===
==== Higher education ====
The term and position of dean is prevalent in American higher education. Although usage differs from one institution to another, the title is used in two principal ways:

- A dean is usually the head of a significant collection of departments within a university (e.g., "dean of the downtown campus", "dean of the college of arts and sciences", "dean of the school of medicine"), with responsibilities for approving faculty hiring, setting academic policies, overseeing the budget, fundraising, and other administrative duties. Such a dean is usually a tenured professor from one of the departments, but relinquishes most teaching and research activities upon assuming the deanship.
- Other senior administrative positions in higher education may also carry the title of dean (or a lesser title such as associate dean or assistant dean). For example, many colleges and universities have a position known as "dean of students", who is in charge of student affairs, and a "dean of the faculty", who serves as an intermediary between the higher administration and faculty in the school's day-to-day administration.

==== Professional schools ====
Most American law schools, medical schools, and other professional schools are part of a university, and so refer to its highest-ranking administrator as a dean. Most have several assistant or associate deans as well (such as an associate dean of academics or an associate dean of students), as well as a select few vice deans.

The American Bar Association's members regulations on the operation of law schools, which must be followed for such an institution to receive and maintain ABA accreditation, define the role of the law school dean. These regulations specify that "A law school shall have a full-time dean, selected by the governing board or its designee, to whom the dean shall be responsible." Thus, a law school dean may not simply be a professor selected by fellow professors, nor even by the president of the university.

Similar standards exist with respect to medical school deans. Specifically, the Liaison Committee on Medical Education (LCME), which accredits medical schools, thereby making them eligible for federal grants and state licensure, sets forth the operative conditions. LCME regulations require that the "chief official of the medical school, who usually holds the title 'dean,' must have ready access to the university president or other university official charged with final responsibility for the school, and to other university officials as are necessary to fulfill the responsibilities of the dean's office." The LCME further require that the dean "must be qualified by education and experience to provide leadership in medical education, scholarly activity, and care of patients" and that "[t]he dean and a committee of the faculty should determine medical school policies."

==== Secondary education ====
The term or office of dean is much less common in American secondary education. Although most high schools are led by a principal or headmaster, a few (particularly private preparatory schools) refer to their chief authority as a dean. In large schools or some boarding schools there may be a dean of men or boys, and a dean of women or girls, or each year (freshman, sophomore, etc.) may have a dean. Some junior high schools and high schools have a teacher or administrator referred to as a dean who is in charge of student discipline and to some degree administrative services.

== See also ==
- Dean (Christianity)
- Dean (disambiguation)
- Head teacher
- Rector (academia)
