= Liza Picard =

English lawyer and historian (1927–2022)

- Born: Elizabeth Kate Sleigh; 11 October 1927; Dedham, Essex, England
- Died: 8 April 2022 (aged 94); London, England
- Occupation: Lawyer; historian
- Education: London School of Economics
- Period: 1997–2017 (as historian)
- Subjects: History of London
- Spouse: Philip Picard (m. 1963; died 1984)
- Children: 1

Elizabeth Kate Picard (née Sleigh; 11 October 1927 – 8 April 2022) was an English lawyer and historian. After retiring as a solicitor at the Inland Revenue, she turned to writing history as a hobby. In 1997 she published Restoration London, the first of several works on the social history of London.

== Early life and education ==
Picard was born in Dedham, Essex, the youngest of three daughters born to James Sleigh, a doctor, and Hilda Scott. During the Second World War she was evacuated to Aberdeenshire. As a teenager she cycled around southern France reporting on the situation of young displaced persons for the Red Cross.

She read law at the London School of Economics.

== Career ==
=== Legal career ===
Picard was called to the bar by Gray's Inn when she was 21, but did not practise as a barrister. She began her career by writing a book in 1948 called Questions and Answers on Private International Law, for which she was paid £25 (equivalent to £1,148 in 2023). During the 1950s she worked as a lawyer for the Colonial Office in Dar es Salaam.

Picard later worked in the Office of the Solicitor of the Inland Revenue until her retirement in 1987. She also chaired the Social Security Appeal Tribunal in Oxford in the 1990s, where, as The Guardian recalled, "she dispensed as much public money as she dared".

=== Writing career ===
Upon retirement Picard began researching the history of seventeenth-century London, publishing a book entitled Restoration London in 1997. Three years later, she published a similar volume entitled Dr. Johnson's London; Elizabeth's London followed in 2003, and Victorian London in 2005. Her last book, Chaucer's People, a social history of England in the fourteenth century, was published in October 2017.

Picard told The Guardian, "I am not a properly trained historian. I am a lawyer by trade, and an inquisitive, practical woman by character".

== Personal life and death ==
She was married to Philip Picard, a barrister, from 1963 until his death in 1984, and they had one son. In Picard's later years, she lived in Hackney and Oxford, before moving to west London at the end of her life. She died on 8 April 2022, aged 94.

== Selected publications ==
- Questions and Answers on Private International Law. 1948
- Restoration London. Weidenfeld & Nicolson, London, 1997. ISBN 0-297-81900-3
- Dr. Johnson's London. Weidenfeld & Nicolson, London, 2000. ISBN 0-297-84218-8
- Elizabeth's London. Weidenfeld & Nicolson, London, 2003. ISBN 0-297-60729-4
- Victorian London. Weidenfeld & Nicolson, London, 2005. ISBN 0-297-84733-3
- Chaucer's People. Weidenfeld & Nicolson, London, 2017. ISBN 978-0297-60903-2
