= The Dean =

Hotel in Providence, Rhode Island, US

Coordinates: 41.823255°N 71.415961°W

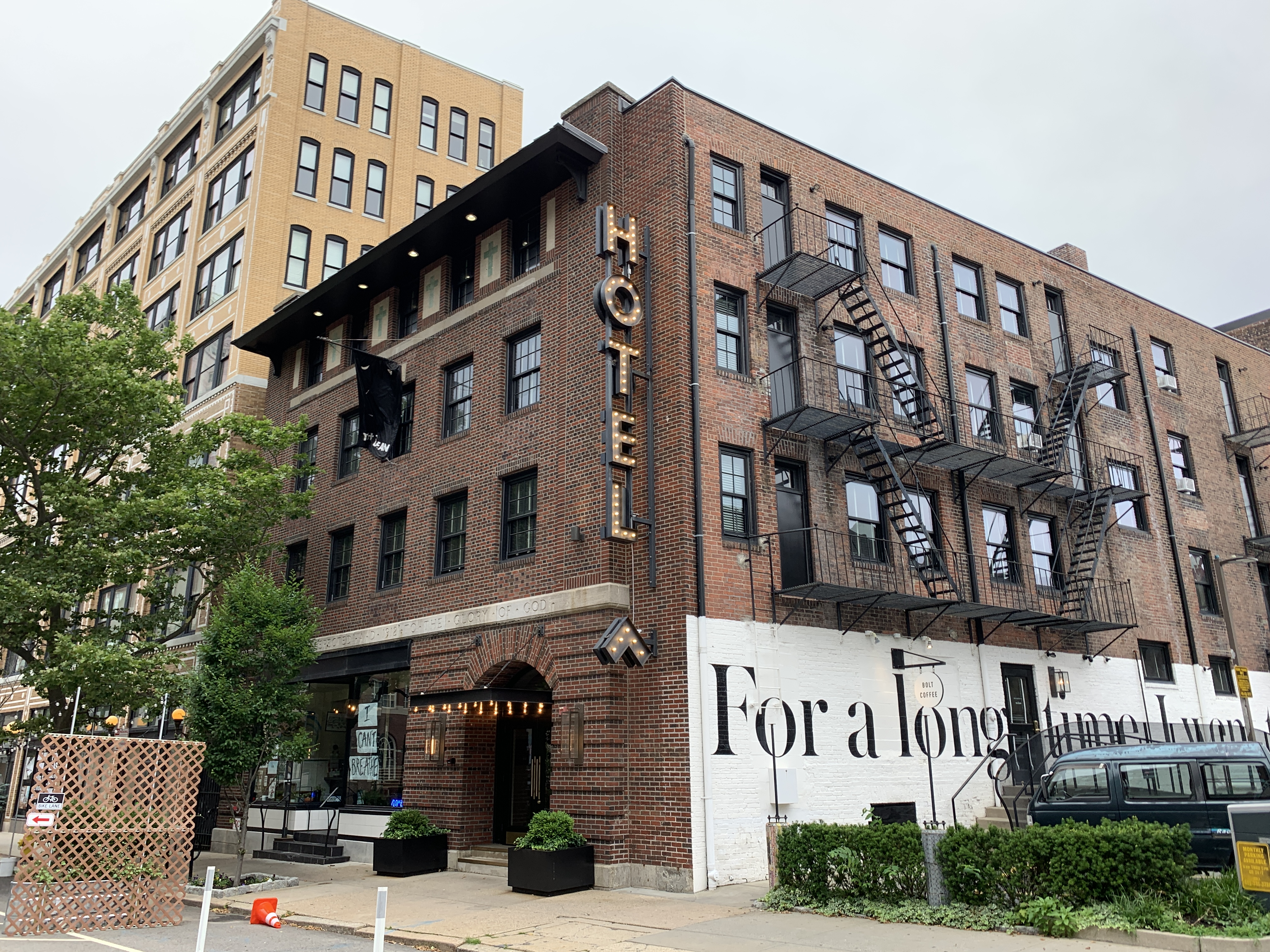

General information
- Location: 122 Fountain St, Providence, RI 02903
- Construction stopped: 1912

Other information
- Number of rooms: 52
- Number of restaurants: 2
- Number of bars: 2

Website
- thedean.com

The Dean is a boutique hotel located at 122 Fountain Street in Providence, Rhode Island. The building's use as a hotel was part of a renewal project in Downtown, Providence.

== History ==
Built in 1912, 122 Fountain Street was used as a shelter run by the Episcopal church and also operated as several adult entertainment establishments known for their illegal actions including a strip club called the Sportsman's Inn. Elements of the hotel's design and decor reference the building's origins. In 2014 the building was turned into the hotel that stands there today.

== Design ==
The hotel was designed by ASH NYC and Kite Architects Inc.

The Dean's rooms include oil paintings by various artists, tables by Rhode Island sculptor Will Reeves, and fixtures by The Steel Yard. The building also loans out refurbished bicycles.

The Dean currently contains four businesses and two food establishments.

The hotel was listed as one of Condé Nast Traveler's top bargain hotels of 2014, and one of Condé Nast Traveler's top hotels in New England in 2019. It has received positive reviews from Vogue, Architectural Digest, The New York Times, and GQ.
