= Robbie Deans =

NZ international rugby union player

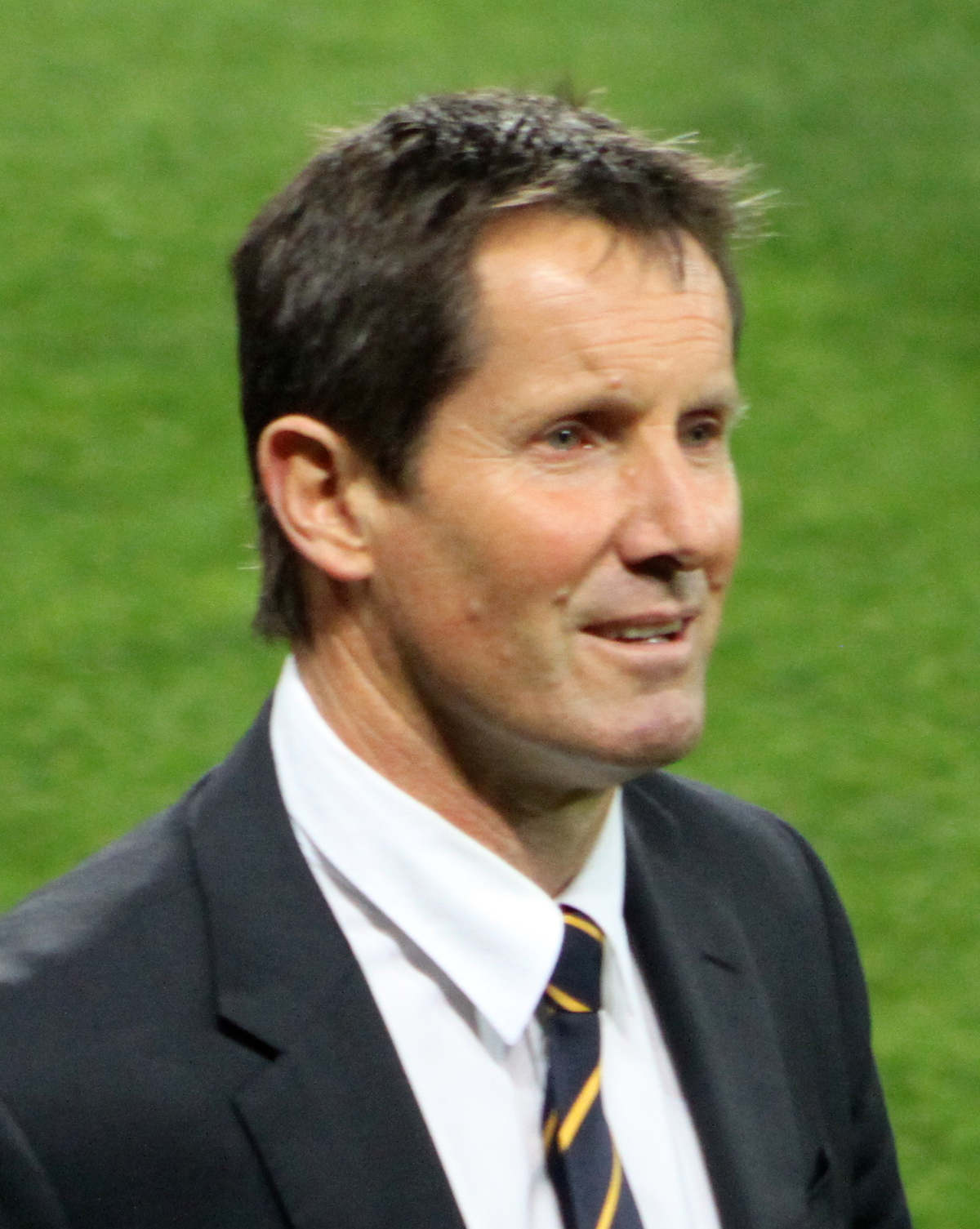
- Born: Robert Maxwell Deans; 4 September 1959 (age 67) Cheviot, New Zealand
- Height: 1.80 m (5 ft 11 in)
- Weight: 79 kg (12 st 6 lb; 174 lb)
- School: Christ's College, Christchurch
- University: Lincoln University
- Notable relative(s): Bruce Deans (brother); Bob Deans (great-uncle)

Rugby union career
- Position: Fullback
Provincial / State sides
Years	Team	Apps	(Points)
1979–1990	Canterbury	146	(1641)
- Correct as of 2007-12-29
International career
Years	Team	Apps	(Points)
1983–1985	New Zealand	5	(50)
- Correct as of 2007-12-29
Coaching career
- Years: Team
- 1997–2000: Canterbury
- 2000–2008: Crusaders
- 2001–2003: New Zealand (assistant coach)
- 2008–2013: Australia
- 2014–pres.: Saitama Wild Knights
- 2015–2019: World XV
- 2026–pres.: Harlequins
- Correct as of 16 September 2026

Robert Maxwell Deans (born 4 September 1959) is a New Zealand rugby union coach and former player, currently the head coach of Japanese club Saitama Wild Knights and Performance Director for Prem Rugby side Harlequins.

He was head coach of the Australian national team between 2008 and 2013. Deans previously coached the Crusaders for eight seasons and was an assistant coach of New Zealand between late 2001 and 2003. He also played nineteen matches for the All Blacks, including five tests.

== Playing career ==
Deans attended Christ's College, Christchurch as a boarder where he played rugby mainly at first five-eighth. He made his provincial debut for Canterbury in 1979 and played mainly at fullback, as the team already had future All Black coach Wayne Smith playing at first-five. Deans was the first-choice goal-kicker for the team and scored 1,641 points for the union. He was a member of the Canterbury team during the Ranfurly Shield era of the early 1980s. This included kicking eight of Canterbury's 16 points in its 16–12 challenge win over Wellington in 1982. In 1983-1984, he played for Grenoble french side club FC Grenoble . The shield reign ended in 1985 against Auckland in "the match of the century" where Deans also played. This reign is the longest in Canterbury rugby union history. He went on to represent Canterbury 146 times, with his career ending in 1990.

Deans also played for New Zealand's national rugby team, the All Blacks. His first game for the All Blacks was against Edinburgh on 26 October 1983. Deans played five tests for the All Blacks, scoring 50 points. He played an additional 14 games for the All Blacks scoring 202 points. His All Black career lasted less than two years, playing his last game against a Mar del Plata selection on 29 October 1985. He did however participate in the controversial Cavaliers tour of South Africa in 1986. Deans also played cricket for Canterbury Country in the Hawke Cup.

== Coaching career ==
=== Canterbury and Crusaders ===
Deans was appointed as coach of the Canterbury team for the 1997 National Provincial Championship (NPC) season. He was assisted by Steve Hansen (former All Black coach). Deans' first season was a success, with Canterbury beating Auckland for the first time in 14 years, then going on to win the title. The following year he managed the Canterbury Crusaders (since renamed Crusaders) Super Rugby franchise who were coached by Wayne Smith. The Crusaders won the title, beating the Auckland Blues (since renamed the Blues) in the final at Eden Park. The Crusaders repeated this feat the following year, with Deans again manager.

In 2000 Deans took over as Crusaders coach after Wayne Smith became All Blacks coach. He coached the Crusaders to their third successive Super 12 title that year, beating the Brumbies in Canberra. He continued to coach the Canterbury team in the NPC in 2000 which led to a Ranfurly Shield win over Waikato; the shield was held until 2003 (totalling 23 challenges). Canterbury's success in the 2000 season saw them host the NPC final at Jade Stadium against Wellington. A victory would have seen Deans coach teams to Super 12, Ranfurly Shield and NPC titles in the same year; however eventually Wellington won 34–29.

From 2001 Deans concentrated solely on the Crusaders. The 2001 Super 12 season was his least successful in charge – the Crusaders finished tenth. But the following season, the Crusaders went through the entire season undefeated and won their fourth title overall, and their second with Deans as coach. In the following two seasons the Crusaders finished runners-up to the Blues in 2003, and then the Brumbies in 2004. The Crusaders won their third title under Deans in 2005. The Crusaders won their sixth title (the first of the expanded Super 14) in 2006, and their fourth win with Deans in charge, making him the most successful coach in Super Rugby history so far. In 2008, Deans' last season in charge of the Crusaders, he coached them to a seventh super rugby title after they beat the NSW Waratahs at Jade Stadium. In honour of the Deans family, Jade Stadium (now AMI Stadium) erected a new stand called the "Deans Stand". Following 22 February earthquake, there remains doubt as to whether AMI Stadium will ever be used again, after some of the ground, including parts of the Deans stand, suffered structural damage. As a result, the new stand was not showcased during the 2011 Rugby World Cup.

John Mitchell appointed Deans as his assistant when he became All Blacks coach in late 2001. Deans held the position until Mitchell was replaced after the 2003 Rugby World Cup. Under Mitchell and Deans, the All Blacks won the 2002 and 2003 Tri-Nations titles, as well as the Bledisloe Cup in 2003.

=== Australia ===
On 14 December 2007, it was announced that Deans had been appointed the new Australia coach. The contract was for four years – leading into the 2011 Rugby World Cup – as Deans became the first ever foreigner to coach Australia. His contract with the Crusaders finished after the 2008 season and the New Zealand Rugby Union agreed to allow Deans to continue as Crusaders coach through the 2008 Super 14 season.

Shortly after the details were made official, Deans released a personal statement on the Crusader's official website:

[...] The decision to leave Christchurch after the end of the 2008 Crusaders season and coach overseas has undoubtedly been one of the most difficult of my professional sporting career. While the rugby marketplace has been global ever since rugby went professional 12 years ago, it is probably only now that I truly appreciate the thought process and the 'what ifs?' that so many others have gone through before reaching this point. To go (off shore) is a big decision. It is not one that is entered into lightly. [...] I am ready to coach internationally. After serving for eleven years as a Super rugby manager and coach here, I feel I can not afford to forgo the position offered to me in Australia. It is both flattering and humbling that the Australian Rugby Union has afforded me this opportunity. While it will no doubt be an interesting position to be in, coaching against New Zealand; it is not without precedent, and will add to my personal development as a coach – as it has done for others before me. I always aspired to leave the Crusaders in good shape when the time came. I believe I will be doing that. Not only do we have a good level of depth among our player base, there are some quality people in place around the team, and some highly promising coaches coming through. Their time is coming. It would not have been right to delay their potential development by hanging on for too long. I'm proud of my association with Canterbury rugby, the Crusaders, Christchurch and the wider Crusaders franchise community. [...] Although the move to Australia opens a new chapter in our lives, it's not a case of closing the book here. Our thoughts will always be with Canterbury and the Crusaders. [...]
Robbie Deans

Deans started well as coach of Australia by winning his first five tests, including the largest win over the All Blacks by the Wallabies in nine years. He ended his debut year of 2008 with mixed results. Australia under Deans lost the following three tests against the All Blacks, coached by arch-rival Graham Henry, but secured home and away wins over reigning the Rugby World Cup champion Springboks – Australia's win in South Africa was its first there in eight years. The Wallabies lost the third match to the Springboks by a record 53–8 score. There were also narrow wins over limited opposition in Italy and against a weakened Irish team.

In 2010 Deans also became the first Wallabies coach to win on the South African highveldt in 47 years after the team won 41–39 in Bloemfontein, thanks to a penalty goal from Kurtley Beale with no time left. While coaching the Wallabies in 2011 they had a mixed year - losing to Samoa before another loss to the All Blacks in Auckland, and defeating South Africa both home and away. In the 2011 Rugby World Cup, Australia suffered a surprise loss to Ireland in pool play, finishing second in their pool and going on to defeat South Africa 11-9 before another loss to the All Blacks (20-6) in the semi-final.

In the final two seasons of Deans' time as the coach of Australia, he became unpopular with the Australian media and public and was referred to as "Dingo" Deans, although the nickname had actually originated in New Zealand after Deans was recruited to leave his native country to coach Australia. (Note: Deans was referred to as Robbie 'Dingo' Deans within New Zealand media in 2008, at a time when he still had a perfect winning record for the Wallabies, including a record 34–19 victory over the All Blacks in 2008 with Australia's highest number of points scored in a win against New Zealand.)

Dissatisfaction amongst players and supporters with the conservative game plan employed by the Wallabies during and after the World Cup, a win rate hovering around 60%, and a poor 3–15 record against the All Blacks led to Deans came under increasing pressure to keep his coaching position. According to rugby writer Gregor Paul, there was also "widespread frustration at Deans' refusal to make peace with Quade Cooper and welcome him back into the set-up after proving himself the best first-five in Australia during Super Rugby" in 2013.

Following the Wallabies 2–1 series defeat to the British & Irish Lions on their 2013 tour and a record 41–16 defeat in the decider, Deans handed his resignation into the ARU thus ending his role as head coach of the Wallabies. During his six-year tenure, Deans coached the Wallabies on 74 occasions, winning 43 times, losing 29 and drawing twice. He won just three times against their main rivals, the All Blacks, and drew once in 2012. He holds a good record against the Springboks, 9 wins from 14, and led the Wallabies to a Tri Nations championship in 2011 and to 3rd place in the 2011 Rugby World Cup.

=== Panasonic Wild Knights ===
On 21 April 2014, Deans was announced as the Panasonic Wild Knights new head coach, succeeding Norifumi Nakajima.

=== Barbarians ===
On 23 June 2017 it was announced that Deans is to coach the Barbarians FC for their match against New Zealand at Twickenham on 4 November 2017

=== Harlequins ===
In March 2026, Deans was announced as the new Performance Director for Prem Rugby side Harlequins from the 2026–27 season onwards. In this role, he would spend 12 weeks per year on site with the team, while working remotely for the remainder.

== Notable family members ==
His brother, Bruce, was an All Black and member of the Canterbury team. His great-uncle, Bob Deans, was an All Black and also captained Canterbury.

== Notes ==
Sporting positions
Preceded by (Australia) John Connolly	Australian national rugby union coach 2008–2013	Succeeded by (Australia) Ewen McKenzie

== Bibliography and references ==
- "Robbie Deans". TheRoar.
- Robbie Deans at the All Blacks (archived)
- Gifford, Phil (2004). The Passion – The Stories Behind 125 years of Canterbury Rugby. Wilson Scott Publishing. ISBN 0-9582535-1-X.
- Howitt, Bob (2005). SANZAR Saga – Ten Years of Super 12 and Tri-Nations Rugby. Harper Collins Publishers. ISBN 1-86950-566-2.
- McIlraith, Matt (2005). Ten Years of Super 12. Hodder Moa. ISBN 1-86971-025-8.
