= Dent Bank =

Coordinates: 54.630°N 2.104°W

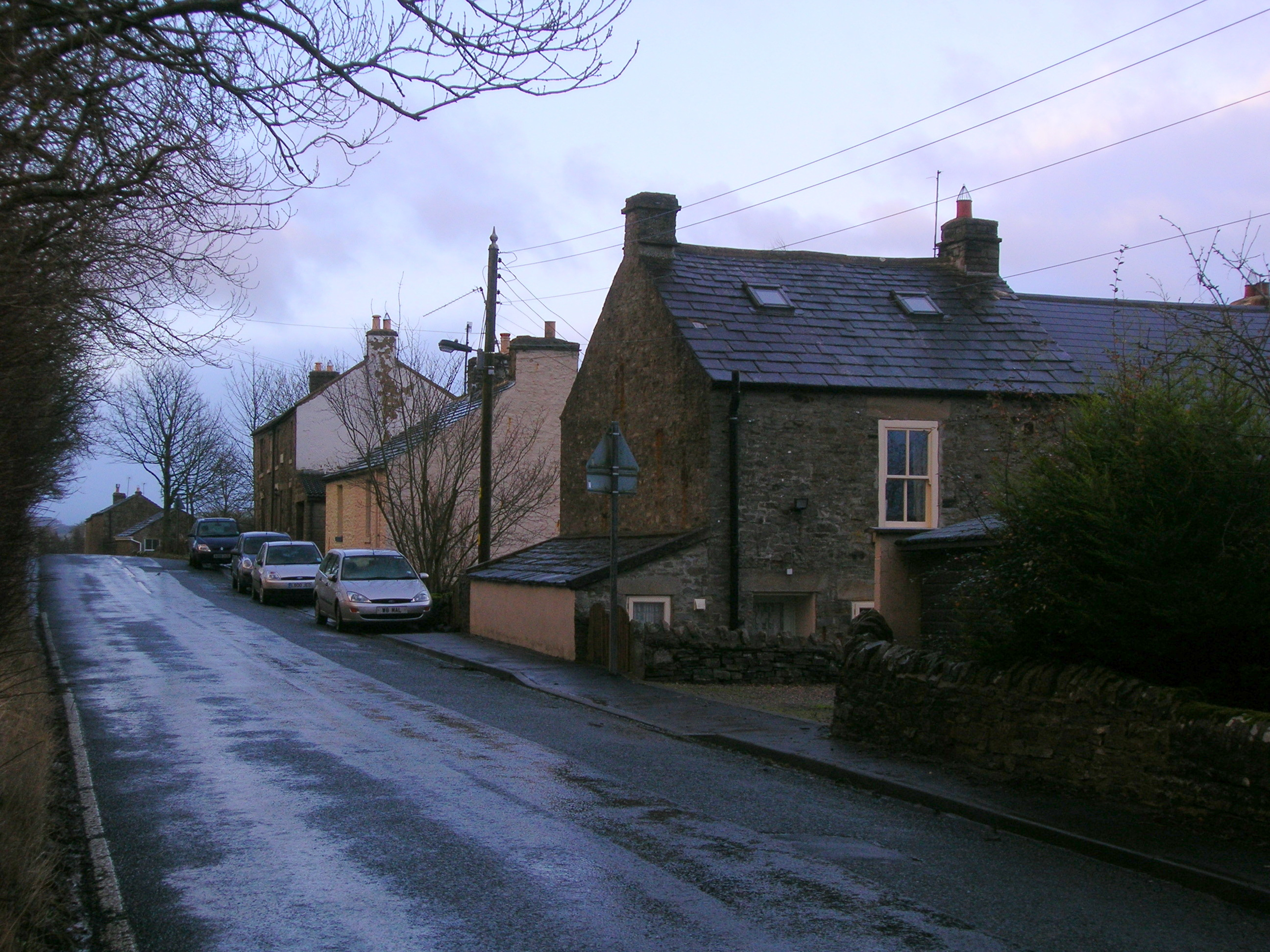

- Location within County Durham
- OS grid reference: NY933260
- Civil parish: Middleton in Teesdale
- Unitary authority: County Durham
- Ceremonial county: Durham
- Region: North East
- Country: England
- Sovereign state: United Kingdom
- Post town: DARLINGTON
- Postcode district: DL12
- Police: Durham
- Fire: County Durham and Darlington
- Ambulance: North East

Dent Bank is a hamlet in the civil parish of Middleton in Teesdale, in County Durham, England. It is situated on the north side of Teesdale between Middleton-in-Teesdale and Newbiggin.

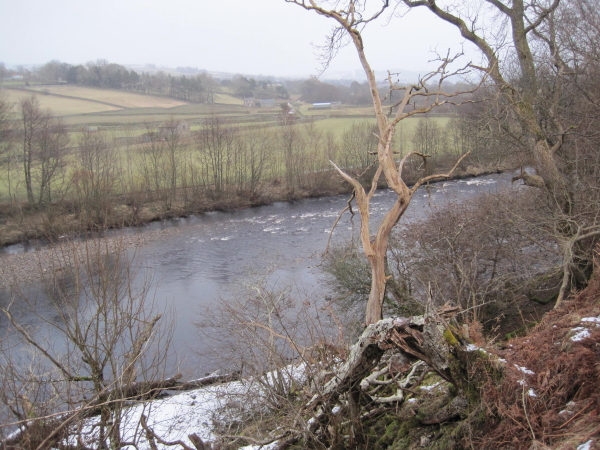
The River Tees seen from the Pennine Way below Dent Bank
