= Dean, Iowa =

- Unincorporated community
- Location within Iowa
- Coordinates: 40°37′39″N 92°42′51″W
- Country: United States
- State: Iowa
- County: Appanoose
- Elevation: 830 ft (250 m)
- Time zone: UTC-6 (Central (CST))
  - Summer (DST): UTC-5 (CDT)
- Area code: 641
- GNIS feature ID: 464513

Dean is an unincorporated community in Appanoose County, Iowa, United States.

== History ==
Dean was platted in 1873. It was named for Henry Clay Dean. Dean's population was 47 in 1902, and 80 in 1925. The population was 92 in 1940.
