= Dedham, Essex =

Village in Essex, England

Coordinates: 51.95888°N 0.99341°E

Dedham
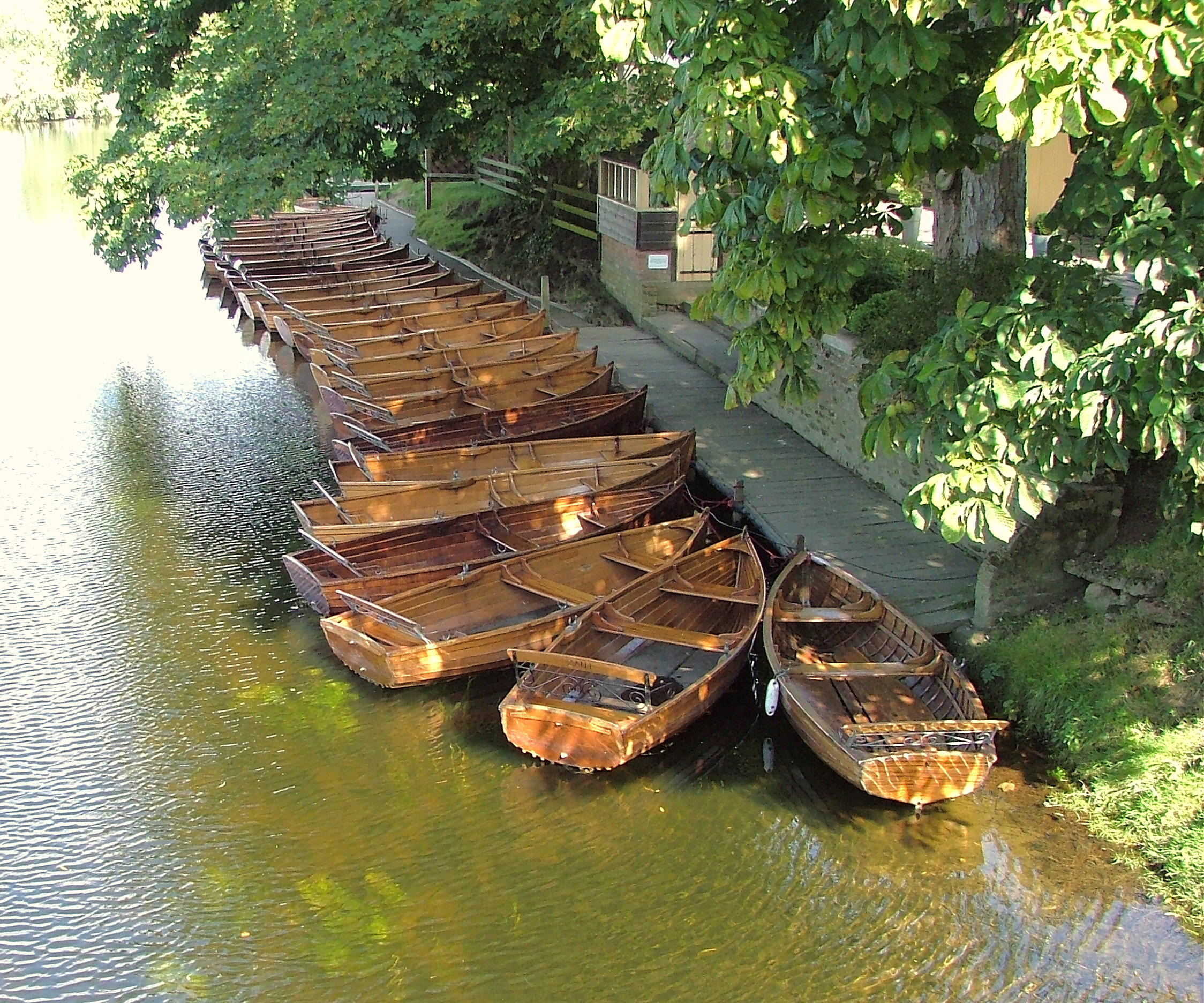
- River Stour, Dedham, Essex (September 2007)

- Location within Essex
- Population: 1,992 (Parish, 2021)
- OS grid reference: TM057331
- District: City of Colchester
- Shire county: Essex
- Region: East
- Country: England
- Sovereign state: United Kingdom
- Post town: COLCHESTER
- Postcode district: CO7
- Dialling code: 01206
- Police: Essex
- Fire: Essex
- Ambulance: East of England
- UK Parliament: Harwich and North Essex

Dedham is a village and civil parish in the City of Colchester district of Essex, England. It is near the River Stour, which is the border of Essex and Suffolk. The nearest town to Dedham is the small market town of Manningtree. The area around Dedham is recognised for its natural beauty, being designated as the Dedham Vale National Landscape. At the 2021 census the parish had a population of 1,992.

== Geography ==
Dedham is frequently rated as containing some of England's most beautiful Lowland landscape, most particularly the water meadows of the River Stour, which passes along the northern boundary of the village forming the boundary between Essex and Suffolk. Dedham has a central nuclear settlement around the Church and the junction of Mill Lane and the High Street (part of the B1029). Connected to Dedham are the hamlets of The Heath and Lamb Corner. The village forms a key part of the Dedham Vale.

== History ==
Early documents record the name as Diddsham, presumably for a family known as Did or Didd. For centuries, the parish of Dedham was in the Hundred of Lexden.

=== Dedham Classis ===
In 1582–1587, a schismatic Presbyterian Christian group called the Dedham Classis, which included dozens of members opposed to the established church, was active in north-east Essex. This group held clandestine meetings and prayer groups in and around Colchester and surrounding villages like Dedham, publishing and distributing versions of Wycliffe's Bible and various other Calvinist texts obtained from London; the Dedham Classis is the best recorded of those active in the sixteenth century.

=== Dedham Settlers in the Massachusetts Bay Colony ===
A group of early dissenters left Dedham to found the township of Dedham in the Massachusetts Bay Colony in 1635. Under the leadership of John Rogers, a preacher banned from his work in England, they established a settlement on the western edge of the colony first established in 1628, now a suburb of the city of Boston. Despite some early setbacks this township eventually proved very successful and a number of prominent US families can trace their ancestry from these early arrivals from East Anglia – see note below on William Tecumseh Sherman.

== John Constable ==
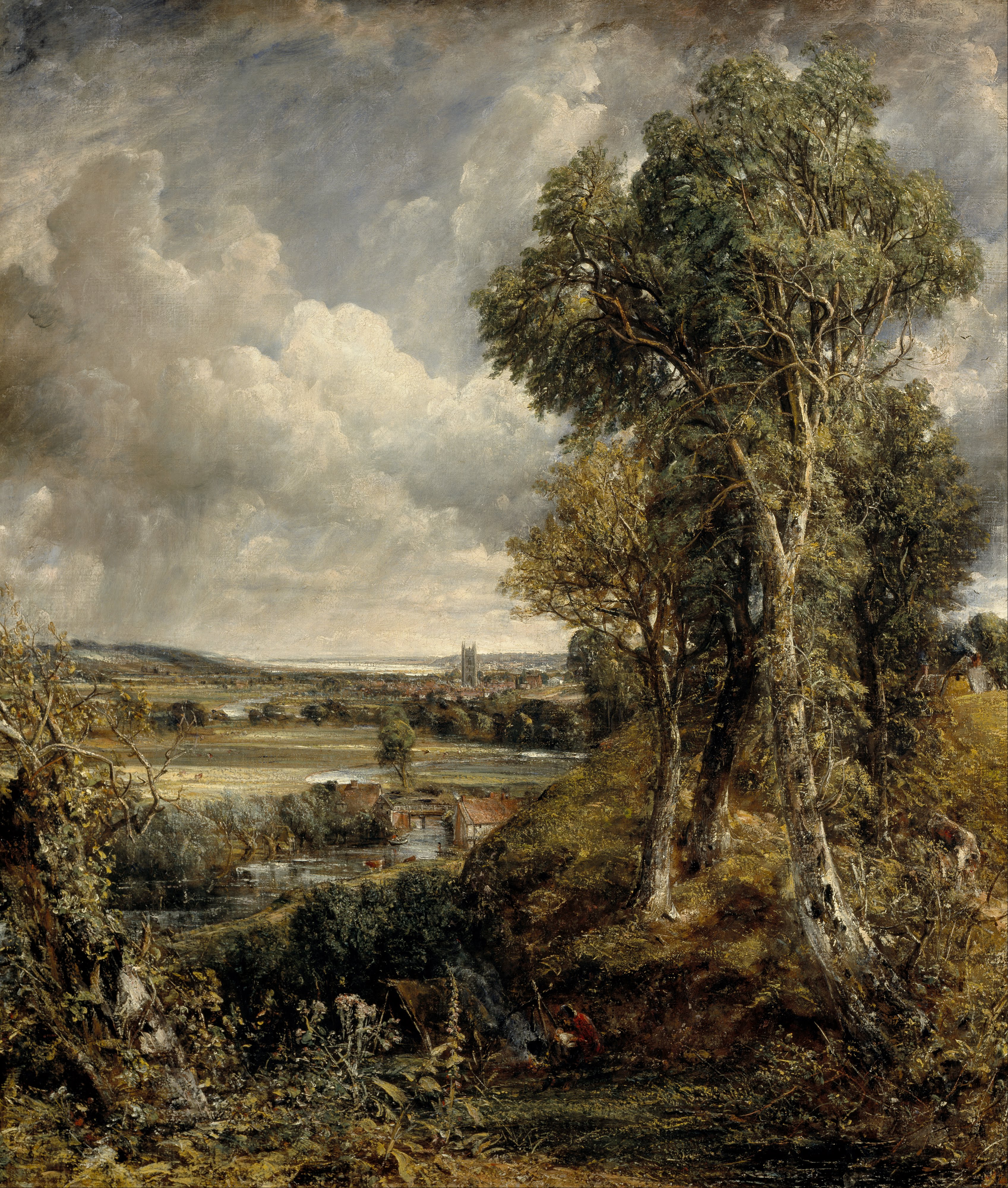
John Constable, Dedham Vale (1828)

Dedham is at the heart of 'Constable Country' – the area of England where Constable lived and painted. Constable attended the town's Grammar School (now the 'Old Grammar School' and 'Well House'), and he would walk to school each morning alongside the River Stour from his family's home in East Bergholt. Many of Constable's paintings feature Dedham, including Dedham Mill, which his father owned, and Dedham Parish Church, whose massive Caen stone and flint tower is a focal point of the surrounding Dedham Vale.

=== Other artists ===
In 1937, Cedric Morris and Arthur Lett-Haines founded the East Anglian School of Painting and Drawing at Dedham. When, however, this burnt down, they moved to Hadleigh, Suffolk.

Of longer influence in Dedham was the horse painter Sir Alfred Munnings, who became President of the Royal Academy. His house in Dedham, Castle House, now contains a gallery of his work, and his studio.

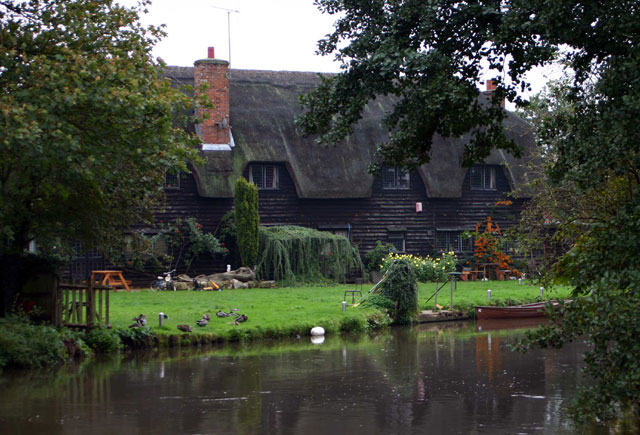
Granary Barn and Museum, Flatford, Suffolk

Tom Keating, the art restorer and famous art forger, was a Dedham resident until his death in 1984. He is buried in the churchyard of St Mary's Church. Keating's best known painting, a Constable pastiche called The Haywain in Reverse, is reportedly on display in the Granary Barn and Museum in Flatford. The sign over the local Sun Inn, depicting Greek sun god Helios in his chariot, was also painted by Keating.

== Architecture ==
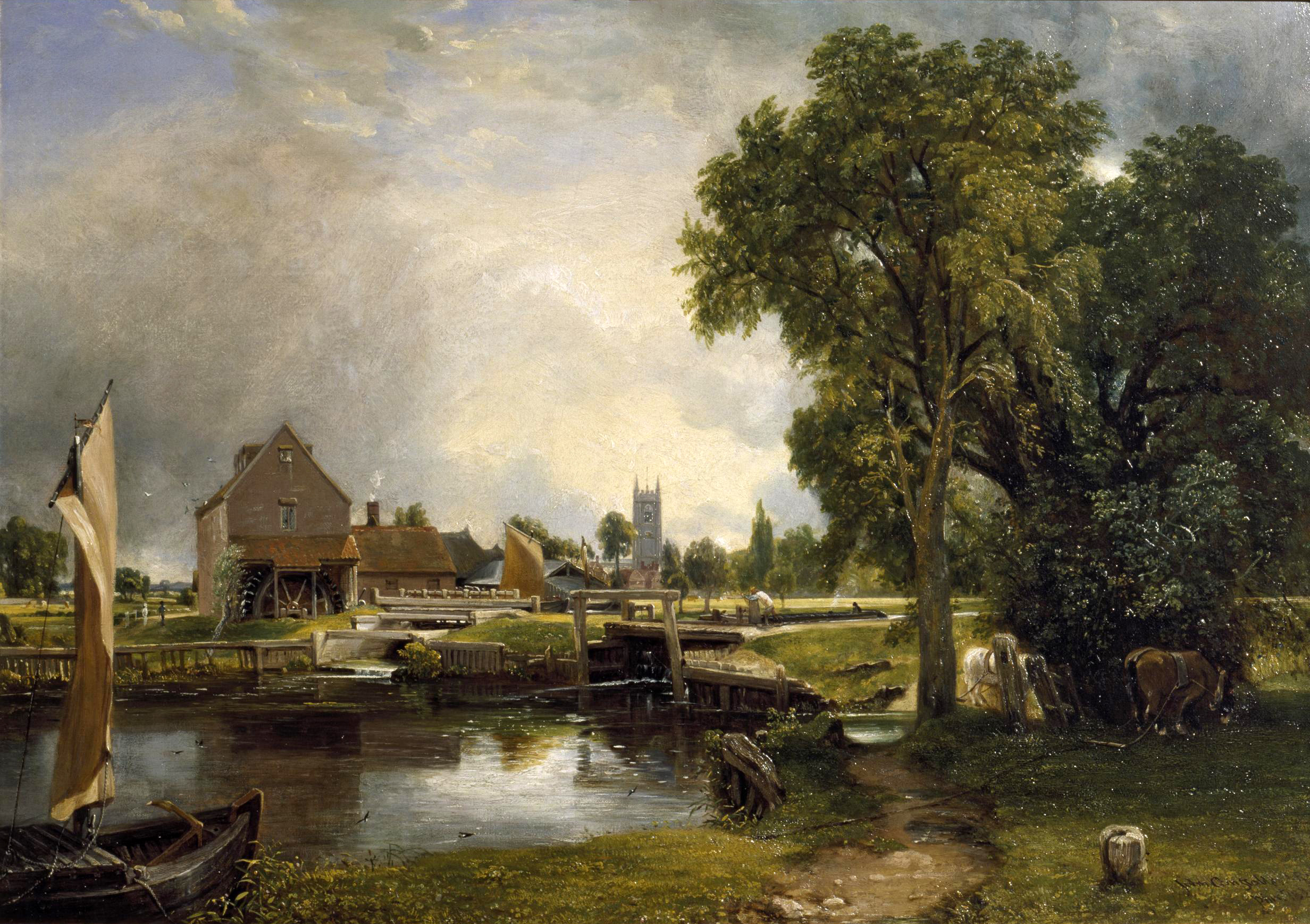
Dedham Lock and Mill by John Constable, 1820

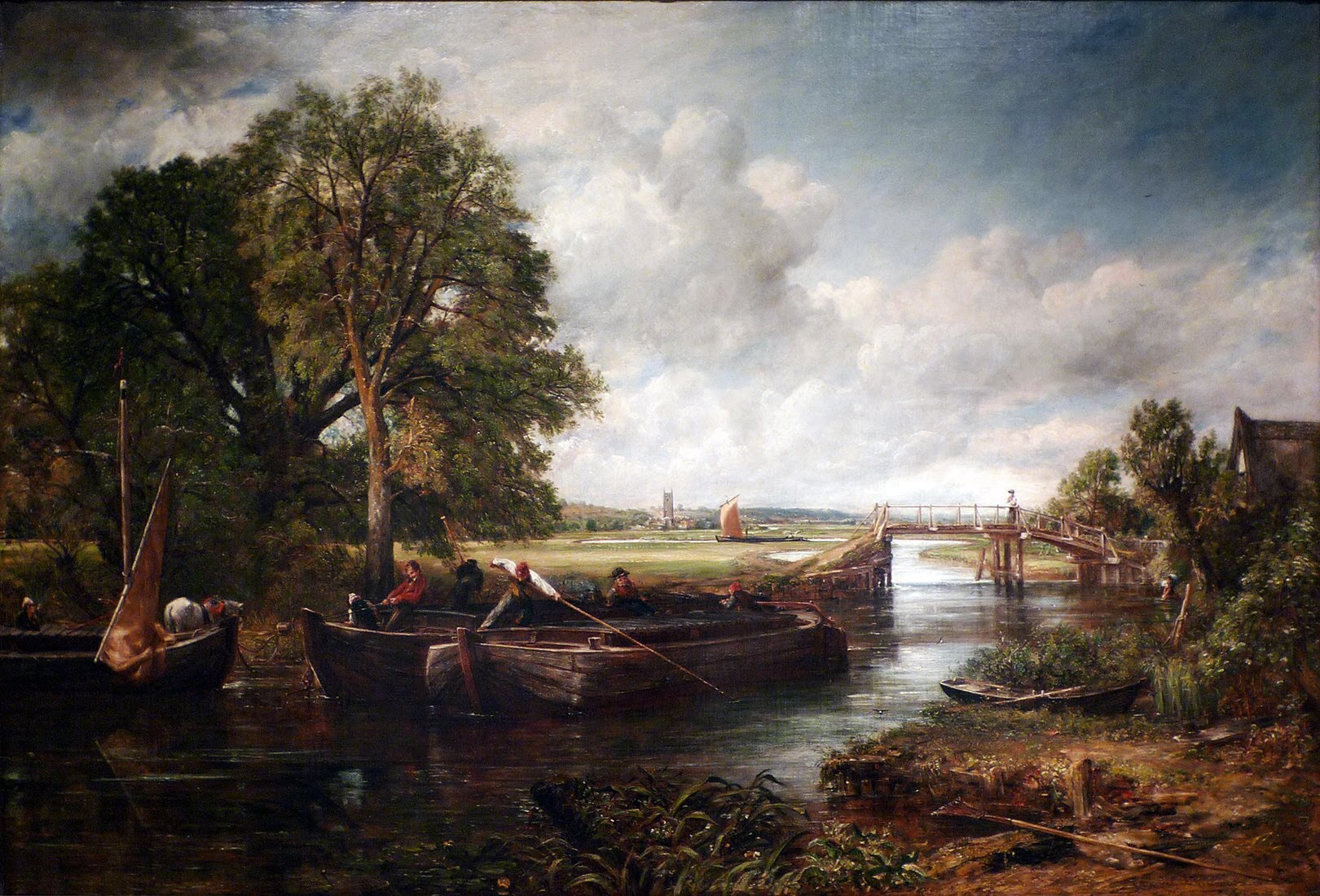
View on the Stour near Dedham by John Constable, 1822

Dedham contains a number of well-preserved buildings:

- Dedham Parish Church – St. Mary the Virgin, Dedham; the present building dates from the late 15th century, and was the last medieval 'wool church' to be completed, albeit in a more economical style than was originally intended. The Ascension by John Constable is on permanent display in the church. A viewing platform on top of the tower (open to the public from Easter to Harvest) gives excellent views of the lower part of the Stour valley. The tower is 118 feet (36 m) high to the top of the pinnacles.
- Sherman's Hall, a Grade I listed, Georgian-fronted townhouse used as a school until 1873 and now belonging to the National Trust.
- The Old Grammar School, founded by Elizabeth I. The present building dates from 1732 and was attended by John Constable. It is now private residences.
- The Sun Inn, a medieval building that retains its coaching arch.
- A Congregational church built in 1872 is now the Dedham Art and Craft Centre.
- Southfields, Grade I listed, is the most splendid of the many medieval buildings in the village. Formerly a factory used when Dedham was a wealthy wool town it is now a series of cottages.
- Castle House, the home of Sir Alfred Munnings and now the Sir Alfred Munnings Art Museum.
- The Assembly Rooms (previously known as the Hewitt Memorial Hall from 1917 to 1997 in memory of the brother of a local benefactor, William Wilkins Hewitt) dates back to c. 1745, with later additions. It was home to Littlegarth School, a private primary school founded in 1940, for several decades until 1994.

Architectural historian Nikolaus Pevsner wrote in 1954 “There is nothing at Dedham to hurt the eye” and in 1938 the Dedham Vale Society was founded with local architect Raymond Erith as its founding Chairman.

== Governance ==
Dedham is part of the electoral ward called Dedham and Langham. The population of this ward at the 2011 Census was 2,943.

== Economy ==
Formerly a rich wool town and market town, Dedham is a flourishing commercial village, with a post office, butcher, Co-op, grocer, delicatessen, cafe, tea rooms, art shop and various other shops. Agriculture is also important with mainly arable land (sugar beet and wheat) but also cattle grazing on the water meadows and some sheep on Grove Hill. There is an industrial estate near the A12 road, a main route passing the west of the village. A business centre and nursing home have recently opened.

== Local amenities ==
- Boat Hire
- Tennis Club – Dedham has a tennis club with three all-weather courts and a club house
- Cricket Club – Dedham's cricket club is on the Duchy Field directly south of the church. It has its own pavilion.
- Football Club – Dedham Old Boys Football Club, founded in 1877, plays its home matches on the Recreation Field to the south of the church.
- Dedham Junior Football Club is a Charter Standard club
- Dedham has an atypically large number of restaurants and hotels for an English village. The Maison Talbooth which is an historic house provides both accommodation and restaurant services
- Dedham Primary School - an Ofsted-rated "Outstanding" primary school located in Parsons Field, 5 minutes walk from the village centre, offering single form entry, from Reception class to Year 6.

== Transport ==
Manningtree can easily be accessed by bicycle or by walking along the banks of the River Stour. Manningtree railway station provides regular, fast commuter services to London and Norwich. Colchester can be reached by bus, with the no. 81 looping through the village and serving Langham, Myland and Colchester North Station (mainline station) on its way to Colchester city centre. School buses service all the schools in Colchester and the independent schools in Ipswich.

== Notable people ==
- John Bond (1932–2012), footballer and later manager.
- William Burkitt (1650–1703), author of A Poor Man's Help and Young Man's Guide (1694), and Expository Notes on the New Testament (1700–03), which was in print for more than 150 years, was Vicar and Lecturer of Dedham from 1692 to 1703.
- Roger A. Freeman (1928–2005), Dedham farmer and author who became a world authority on the operations of the US Eighth Air Force in World War II.
- Major Charles Gilson (1878–1943), soldier and author of popular adventure fiction, was born in the village.
- Birthplace of William Haggar (1851–1925), whose pioneering work with film at the start of the twentieth century made him one of Britain's foremost directors.
- Samuel Meredith RN (1796–1873), the first person to be appointed to the rank of Chief Constable was born in the village.
- Matthew Newcomen (c.1610–1669), a co-author of Smectymnuus (1641), who preached before parliament in 1643, was Vicar and Lecturer of Dedham from 1636 to 1662.
- Liza Picard (1927–2022), Lawyer and historian
- Osborne Reynolds (1842–1912), engineer and physicist, who developed the understanding of electricity, magnetism, and fluid flow (part of the equation for determining the change between 'streamline' and 'turbulent' flow is still called a 'Reynold's Number'), was the son of a headmaster of Dedham Grammar School.
- Rear Admiral Ernest Roberts (1878–1933), rugby union international who represented England from 1901 to 1907.
- John Rogers (c.1570–1636), sometimes referred to as "Roaring" Rogers, who was the most famous preacher of his age, was Vicar and Lecturer of Dedham from 1605 to 1636.
- Dedham is the ancestral home of General William Tecumseh Sherman, of American Civil War fame, and founding father Roger Sherman, the only person to have signed all four great state papers of the United States. Their ancestors emigrated to Massachusetts in the 1630s.
- Mary Whitehouse (1910–2001), social activist who opposed social liberalism and the mainstream British media, both of which she accused of encouraging a more permissive society is buried in Dedham.
