= Dedham Heath =

Hamlet in Essex, England

Coordinates: 51.943°N 0.996°E

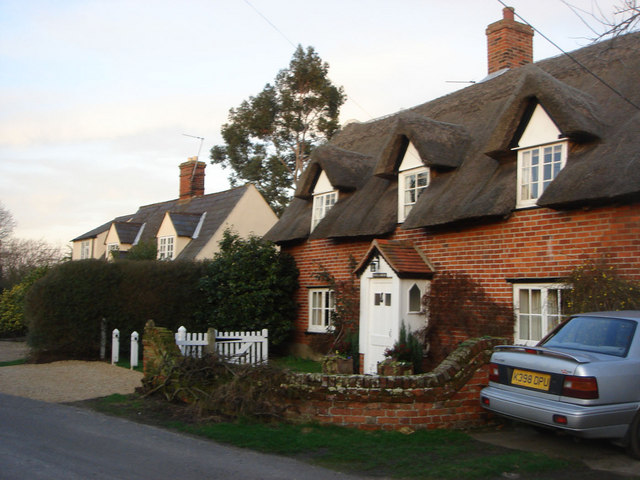
- Anchor Lane

- Location within Essex
- Area: 0.4998 km^{2} (0.1930 sq mi)
- Population: 601 (2021 census)
  - Density: 1,202/km^{2} (3,110/sq mi)
- Civil parish: Dedham
- District: Colchester
- Shire county: Essex
- Region: East
- Country: England
- Sovereign state: United Kingdom
- Police: Essex
- Fire: Essex
- Ambulance: East of England

Dedham Heath, known locally as The Heath, is a hamlet in the civil parish of Dedham, in the Colchester district, in the county of Essex, England. In 2021 it had a population of 601.
