= HMS Deane =

Frigate of the Royal Navy

History

United Kingdom
- Name: HMS Deane
- Builder: Bethlehem-Hingham Shipyard Inc., Massachusetts, United States
- Laid down: 30 June 1943
- Launched: 29 September 1943
- Commissioned: 26 November 1943
- Out of service: Returned to US Navy on 4 March 1946
- Identification: Pennant number K551
- Fate: Sold for scrapping on 7 November 1946.

General characteristics
- Class & type: Captain-class frigate
- Displacement: 1,400 long tons (1,422 t)
- Length: 306 ft (93 m)
- Beam: 36.75 ft (11.2 m)
- Draught: 9 ft (2.7 m)
- Propulsion: Two Foster-Wheeler Express "D"-type water-tube boilers; GE 13,500 shp (10,070 kW) steam turbines and generators (9,200 kW); Electric motors for 12,000 shp (8,900 kW); Two shafts
- Speed: 24 knots (44 km/h; 28 mph)
- Range: 5,500 nmi (10,200 km; 6,300 mi) at 15 knots (28 km/h; 17 mph)
- Complement: 186
- Sensors & processing systems: SA & SL type radars; Type 144 series Asdic; MF Direction Finding antenna; HF Direction Finding Type FH 4 antenna
- Armament: 3 × 3 in (76 mm) /50 Mk.22 guns; 1 × twin Bofors 40 mm mount Mk.I; 7–16 × 20 mm Oerlikon guns; Mark 10 Hedgehog A/S projector; Depth charges; QF 2-pounder naval gun

HMS Deane was a Captain-class frigate , originally to be built for the U.S. Navy as a Buckley-class destroyer escort. Before she was finished in 1943, she was transferred to the Royal Navy under the terms of Lend-Lease, and saw service during World War II.

Constructed by the Bethlehem-Hingham Shipyard Inc. in Massachusetts, and was assigned with the hull number DE-86 but no name. The warship was launched on 29 September 1943 and was commissioned into the Royal Navy on 26 November of that year. She served for three years with the British as HMS Deane, and operated mainly in British waters and escorting Arctic convoys. The frigate was also one of the ships tasked with escorting and overseeing the surrender of German U-boats at the end of the war. She was returned to the US Navy on 4 March 1946, and then sold for scrapping on 7 November 1946.
