= Denstroude =

Hamlet in Kent, England

Coordinates: 51.31557°N 1.020°E

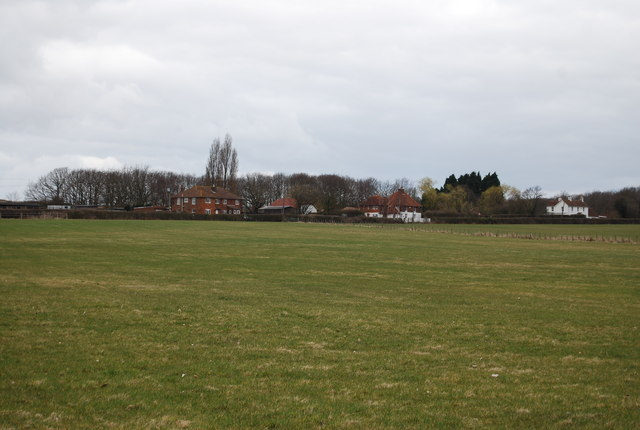
- Across the fields

- Location within Kent
- District: Swale
- Shire county: Kent
- Region: South East
- Country: England
- Sovereign state: United Kingdom
- Post town: Canterbury
- Postcode district: CT2
- Police: Kent
- Fire: Kent
- Ambulance: South East Coast

Denstroude is a dispersed hamlet located to the west of the A290 road north of Canterbury in Kent, England. It is a collection of houses and farms, one of which takes its name from the hamlet; the other being Parsonage Farm, although there is no church nearby.

It stretches between the parishes of Blean and Dunkirk (where the 2011 Census population is included.), in the districts of Canterbury and Swale respectively.

Edward Hasted in 1799, only mentions 'Denstroud common'.
