= Deepthwaite =

Hamlet in Cumbria, England

Coordinates: 54.243°N 2.742°W

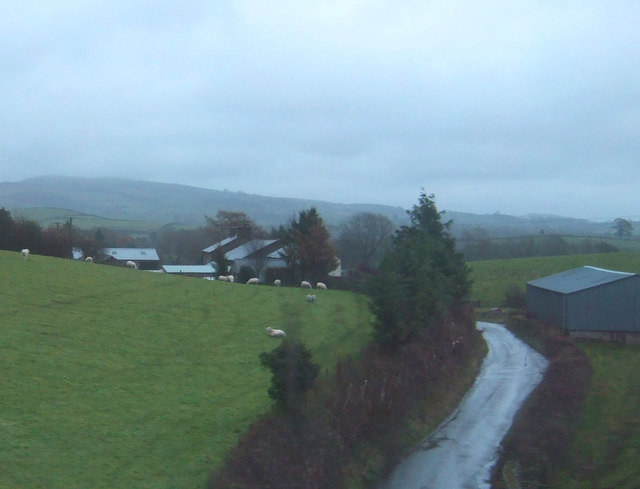
- Minor road towards Deepthwaite

- Location in South Lakeland Location within Cumbria
- OS grid reference: SD516833
- Civil parish: Heversham; Preston Richard
- Unitary authority: Westmorland and Furness
- Ceremonial county: Cumbria
- Region: North West
- Country: England
- Sovereign state: United Kingdom
- Post town: MILNTHORPE
- Postcode district: LA7
- Dialling code: 015395
- Police: Cumbria
- Fire: Cumbria
- Ambulance: North West
- UK Parliament: Westmorland and Lonsdale

Deepthwaite is a hamlet in Cumbria, England.
