= Dean, Nevada =

Ghost town in Nevada, U.S.

Coordinates: 40°25′31″N 116°51′22″W

Dean is a ghost town in Lander County, in the U.S. state of Nevada.

== History ==
A post office was established at Dean in 1894, and remained in operation until 1905. The area was named after one Mr. Dean, a local rancher.
