= Beast of Dean =

Folkloric animal said to live in the Forest of Dean

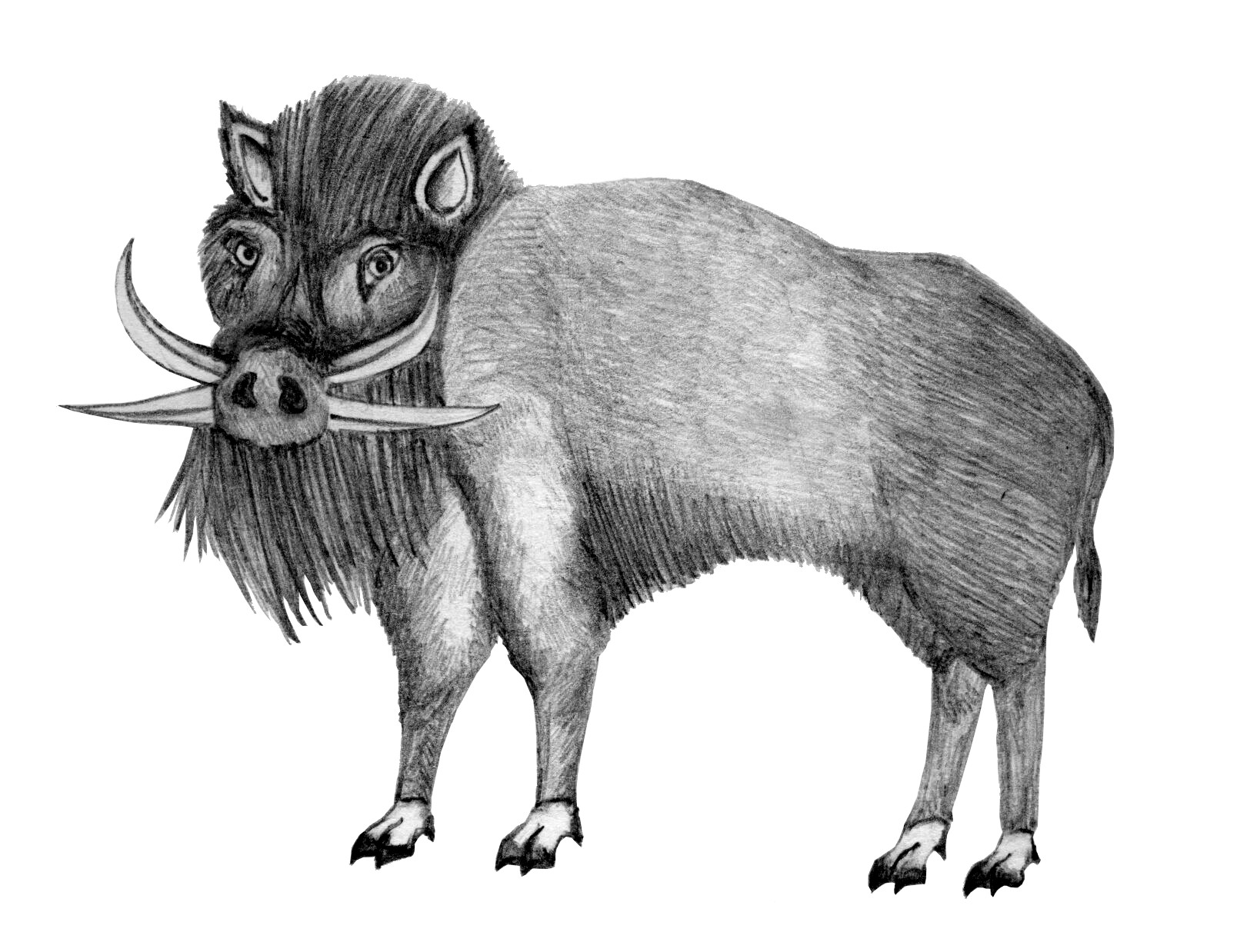
- An artistic illustration of the Beast of Dean.

Creature information
- Folklore: English Folklore

Origin
- Country: United Kingdom
- Region: Gloucestershire

The Beast of Dean is the name of an animal from English folklore that is said to live, or to have once lived, in the Forest of Dean: a large, "ancient woodland" bounded by the rivers Severn and Wye in Gloucestershire, England. Despite several attempts to encounter, capture, or kill the beast in the early 19th century, no scientific evidence has been found to support the existence of the Beast of Dean or any similar creature in the Forest of Dean. The Beast is also occasionally mentioned in literature related to cryptozoology.

== History ==
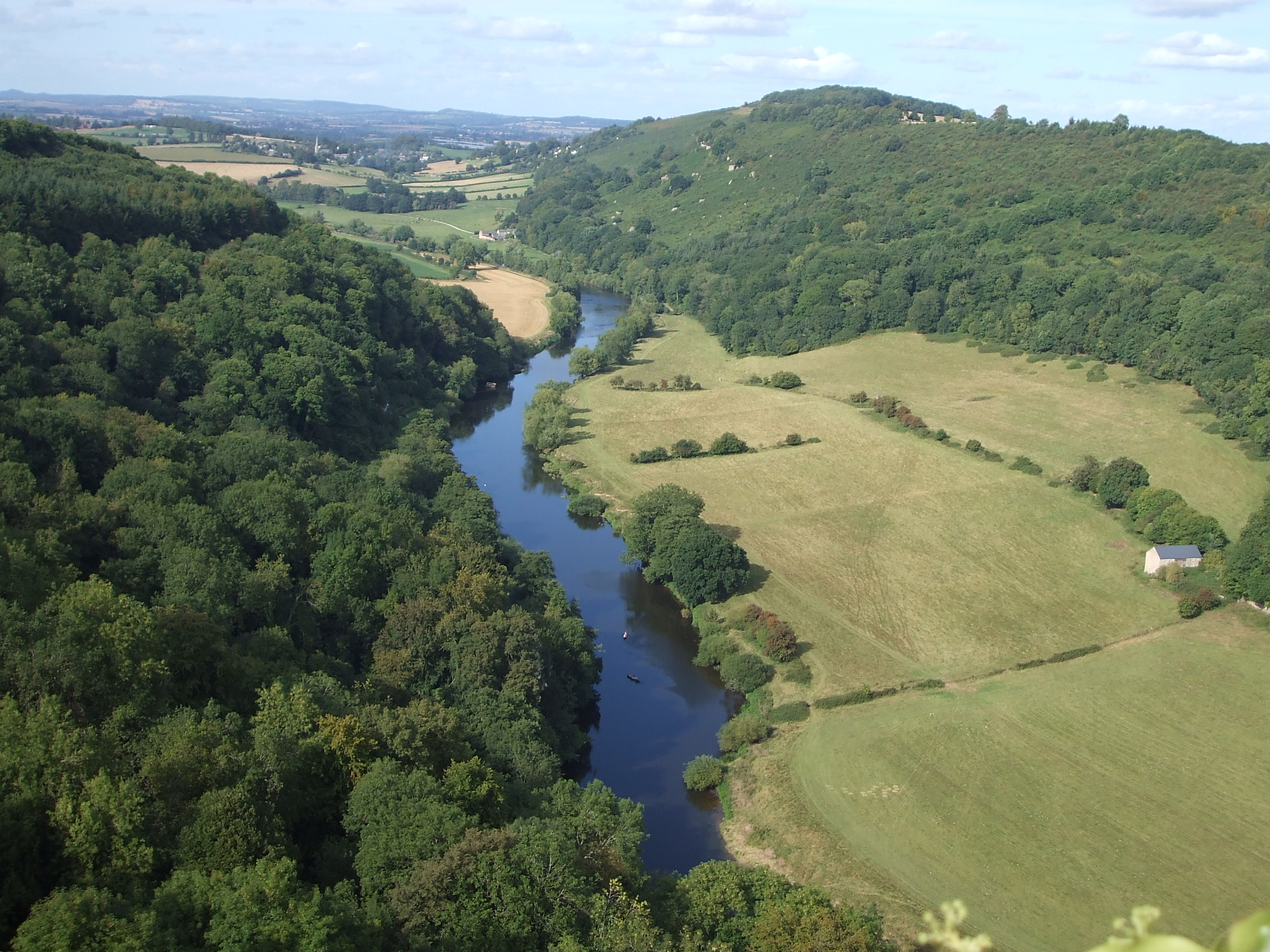
The Forest of Dean, the reported home of Beast of Dean

The Beast of Dean was reported to be a boar of sufficient size to fell trees and hedges, and folktales alleging the animal existed in the forest appear to have their origins in the 18th or early 19th centuries. Other 19th century accounts report the existence of a significant population of boars in the forest, and "vast droves" of them were apparently allowed into the forested area in autumn to forage around this time. Wild boar can still be found in the Forest of Dean to this day, but many 20th and early 21st century references to the creature are made by "cryptozoologists", who presume the beast to be (or have been) a real animal that was unknown to science. Farmers from the village of Parkend undertook an expedition to capture and kill the beast in 1802; however, their efforts failed to uncover any animal resembling the creature in question.

== In popular culture ==
In 2007, the science-fiction television series Primeval reimagined the Beast of Dean as a living gorgonopsid that arrived in the present day through a wormhole that bridged the Permian Period with the modern era.

== See also ==
- Hogzilla
- Babi ngepet
