= Kathryn Deans =

Australian children's fantasy author

- Born: Dandenong Ranges, Australia
- Writing career
- Genre: Children's fantasy
- Website: www.kathryndeans.com

Kathryn Deans is an Australian children's fantasy author. She was raised in the Dandenong Ranges near Melbourne in Australia.

== Works ==
- All The Flowers of Babylon, in issue 25/26 of the Speculative Fiction magazine Aurealis
- Shimmer, a children's fantasy novel (book one of the troll trilogy) published by Pan MacMillan, 2005
- Glow, a children's fantasy novel (book two of the troll trilogy) published by Pan MacMillan, 2006
- Shine, a children's fantasy novel (book three of the troll trilogy) published by Pan MacMillan, 2008
- Meaner Than Fiction, an adult true-crime novel published by Five Mile Press
