= USS Dean II =

Patrol vessel of the United States Navy

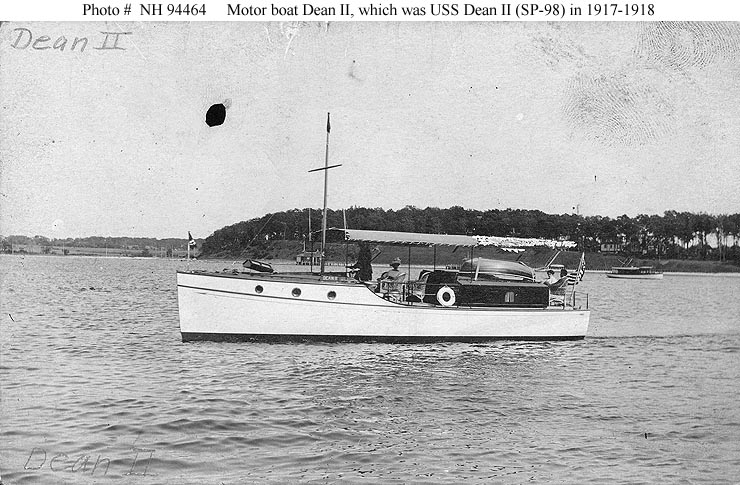
- Dean II as a private motorboat prior to World War I.

History

United States
- Name: USS Dean II
- Namesake: Previous name retained
- Completed: 1915
- Acquired: 2 May 1917
- Commissioned: 10 May 1917
- Decommissioned: 31 May 1918
- Fate: Returned to owner 16 July 1918
- Notes: Operated as private motorboat Dean II 1915-1917 and from 1918

General characteristics
- Type: Patrol vessel
- Length: 42 ft (13 m)

USS Dean II (SP-98) was an armed motorboat that served in the United States Navy as a patrol vessel from 1917 to 1918.

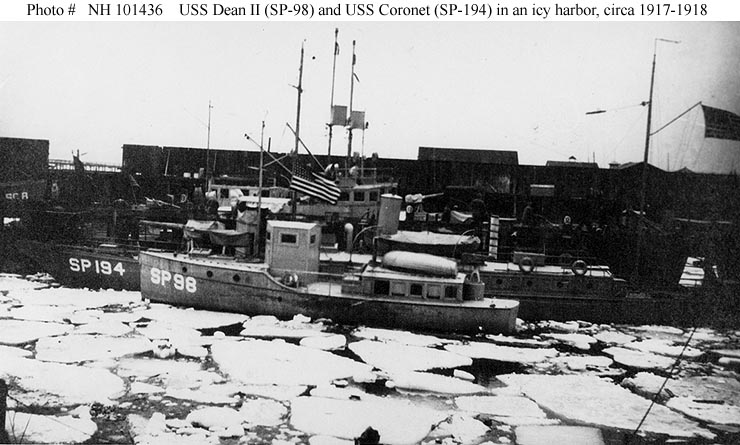
USS Dean II in an icy port in the winter of 1917–1918. To starboard and inboard of her is patrol vessel USS Coronet (SP-194), and submarine chaser USS SC-8 is partially visible at upper left.

Dean II was built as a civilian motorboat in 1915 at Greenport, New York. The U.S. Navy, which inspected her for possible naval use as a patrol boat in World War I and deemed her a "well built and seaworthy boat for her size", acquired her on 2 May 1917 under a free lease from her owner. She was commissioned on 10 May 1917 as USS Dean II (SP-98).

Dean II was assigned to the 3rd Naval District, where she performed patrol duty. In March 1918, she was ordered to be returned to her owner. Decommissioned on 31 May 1918, she was returned to her owner on 16 July 1918.
