= Bob Deans =

NZ rugby union player (1884–1908)

- Born: Robert George Deans; 19 February 1884 Christchurch, New Zealand
- Died: 30 September 1908 (aged 24) Darfield, New Zealand
- Height: 1.83 m (6 ft 0 in)
- Weight: 85.6 kg (189 lb)
- School: Christchurch Boys' High School
- Notable relative(s): Bruce Deans (grandnephew); Robbie Deans (grandnephew)

Rugby union career
- Position: Centre three-quarter
Amateur team(s)
Years	Team	Apps	(Points)
1902–1908	High School Old Boys		
- Correct as of 7 May 2007
Provincial / State sides
Years	Team	Apps	(Points)
1903–1908	Canterbury	25	
International career
Years	Team	Apps	(Points)
1905–1908	New Zealand	24	(63)

Robert George Deans (19 February 1884 – 30 September 1908) was a New Zealand and Canterbury rugby union footballer. In 1905, Deans entered New Zealand rugby folklore for his disallowed try against Wales in the famous Match of the Century. Deans claimed to have scored a try that would have drawn New Zealand level but was pulled back over the line before the referee could catch up. It was the only match that New Zealand lost in the 35-match tour. Deans was 24 years old when he died as a result of complications arising from an appendix operation.

== Family members ==
Deans' great nephews Bruce Deans and Robbie Deans also played for Canterbury and the All Blacks. Robbie is the former Australian head coach. Jane Deans (died 1911) was his grandmother.

== See also ==
- High School Old Boys RFC
