= Bruce Deans =

New Zealand rugby union footballer and coach

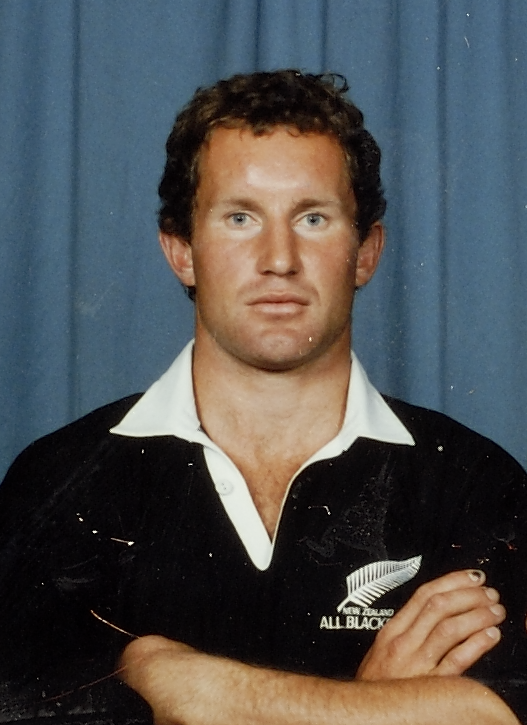
- Deans in 1987
- Born: Ian Bruce Deans; 25 November 1960 Cheviot, New Zealand
- Died: 16 August 2019 (aged 58)
- Height: 1.79 m (5 ft 10 in)
- Weight: 76 kg (12 st 0 lb)
- School: Christ's College
- Notable relative(s): Robbie Deans (brother); Bob Deans (great-uncle)

Rugby union career
- Position: Half-back
Provincial / State sides
Years	Team	Apps	(Points)
1982–1990	Canterbury	116	
International career
Years	Team	Apps	(Points)
1987–1989	New Zealand	10	(24)

Ian Bruce Deans (25 November 1960 – 16 August 2019) was a New Zealand rugby union player. He played for Canterbury during the 1980s and was a key part of the squad for many years. He played for two seasons for New Zealand. He was selected to be the understudy to half-back David Kirk in the All Black squad for the inaugural Rugby World Cup in 1987, but Frano Botica and himself didn't play a match. His first selection came during an end of seasons tour of Japan. Deans also played cricket for Canterbury Country in the Hawke Cup.

== Personal life ==
Bruce Deans played his club rugby at Glenmark Rugby Club, in North Canterbury alongside his brother Robbie Deans. After retiring from rugby, Deans managed his sheep farm near Cheviot.

Deans' brother Robbie Deans and great-uncle Bob Deans also played for Canterbury and the All Blacks. Bruce Deans died of cancer on 16 August 2019, aged 58.
