= Dean, Oxfordshire =

Hamlet in Oxfordshire, England

Coordinates: 51.904°N 1.503°W

Dean
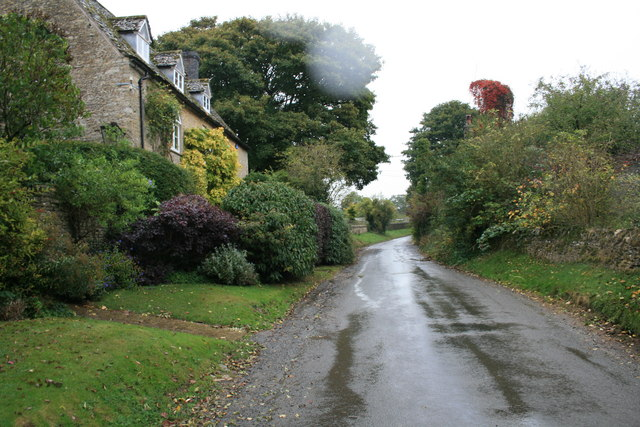
- Road through Dean

- Location within Oxfordshire
- OS grid reference: SP3422
- Civil parish: Spelsbury
- District: West Oxfordshire
- Shire county: Oxfordshire
- Region: South East
- Country: England
- Sovereign state: United Kingdom
- Post town: Chipping Norton
- Postcode district: OX7
- Dialling code: 01608
- Police: Thames Valley
- Fire: Oxfordshire
- Ambulance: South Central
- UK Parliament: Witney
- Website: Spelsbury Parish Council

Dean is a hamlet in Spelsbury civil parish, about 2 miles (3 km) north of Charlbury and 3.5 miles (5.6 km) southeast of Chipping Norton, Oxfordshire. Its toponym derives from the fact that it is between the valleys of the Coldron Brook and one of its tributaries.

== History ==
The Hawk Stone, about 0.5 miles (800 m) north of Dean, is a Neolithic standing stone. At a junction of two lanes in the centre of Dean is the base of a medieval preaching cross. Spelsburydown is a 17th-century house that was re-fronted in the 18th century. It is of coursed squared limestone with ashlar dressings and has a Stonesfield slate roof. About 1,200 yards (1,100 m) northeast of Spelsburydown is a six-bay barn built of coursed limestone rubble that dates from the late 17th or early 18th century.

Dean Mill is a watermill on Coldron Brook. It was probably built in the 18th century and altered probably in the 20th century. The building is of coursed rubble with a Stonesfield slate roof. Dean Manor House was built early in the 18th century, reputedly in 1702 for Thomas Rowney, MP for Oxford. It is of coursed rubble with ashlar dressings. Dean Manor Cottage is a small house built early in the 18th century. It is of coursed rubble with a Stonesfield slate roof. Pear Tree Cottage is a mid-18th-century small house built of coursed limestone rubble.

== Notable people ==
Dean is the home of Peter Gummer, Baron Chadlington and the constituency home of the former UK Prime Minister David Cameron. It was also the home of the family of Ronnie Barker.
