= Bela Viaduct =

Railway viaduct in Cumbria, England

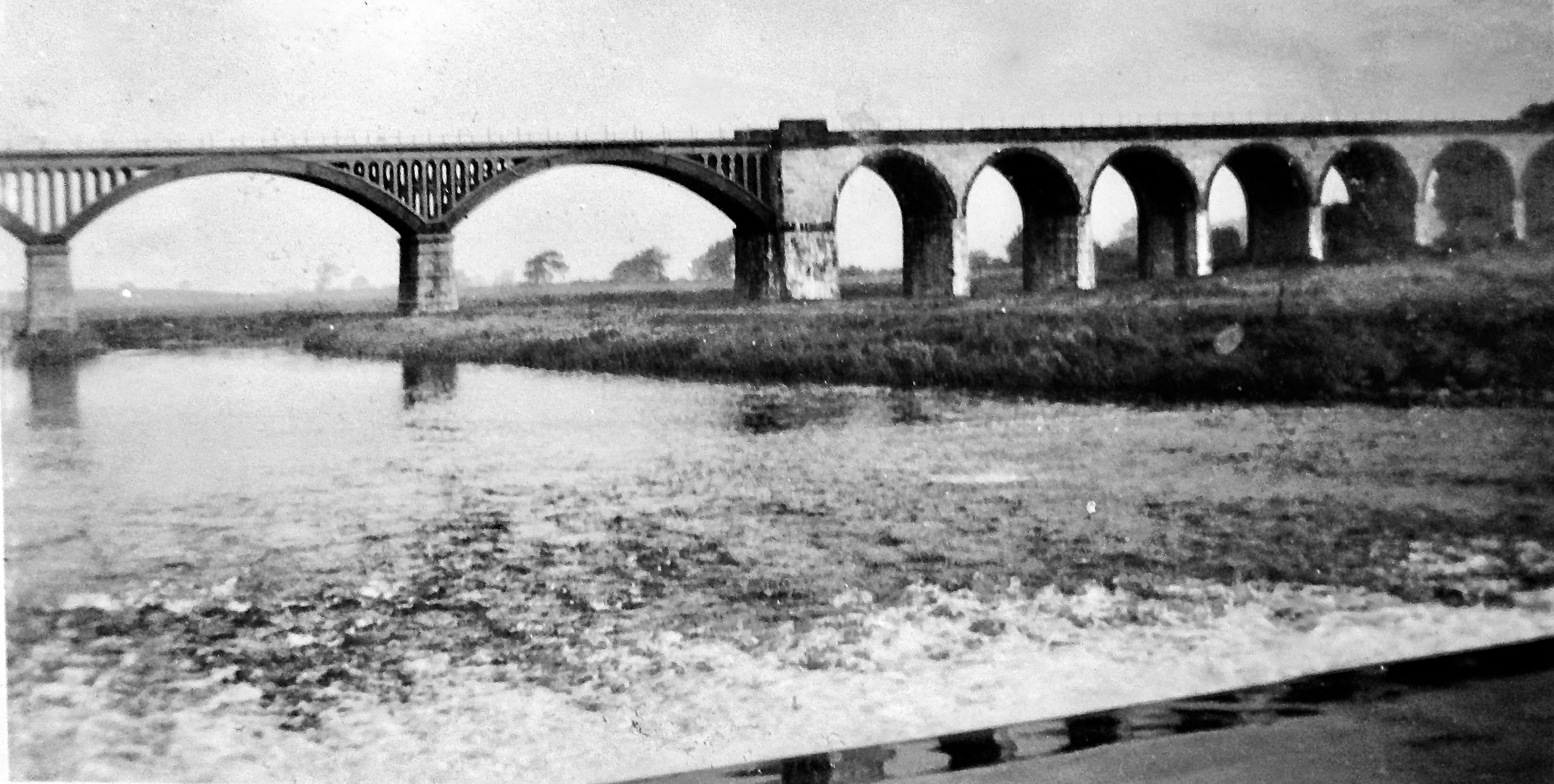
- Coordinates: 54.2272°N 2.7873°W
- OS grid reference: SD486814
- Crossed: River Bela
- Other name(s): Beela Viaduct; Sandside Viaduct; Dallam Bridge

Characteristics
- No. of spans: 26

Rail characteristics
- No. of tracks: 1
- Track gauge: 1,435 mm (4 ft 8 1/2 in) standard gauge

History
- Opened: 26 June 1876
- Closed: September 1963
- Demolished: May 1966

Bela Viaduct was a railway bridge straddling the mouth of the River Bela where it flows into the River Kent, in Cumbria, England. The viaduct was part of the Arnside to Hincaster branch. It was opened in 1876, closed to all traffic in 1963, and demolished in 1966.

== History ==
In 1865, the Furness Railway gained Parliamentary approval (the Furness and Lancaster and Carlisle Union Railway Act 1865 (28 & 29 Vict. c. cccxxix)) to construct a short branch between Arnside on their line between Carnforth and Barrow, and Hincaster Junction on the Lancaster and Carlisle Railway (Note: At that time, the Lancaster and Carlisle Railway was being operated by the London North Western Railway, who assumed full control of the line between Lancaster and Carlisle after the Hincaster branch had been built.) heading north from Carnforth to Oxenholme and beyond. The branch would enable coke trains from County Durham, coming across the Pennines and onto the main line at Tebay, to avoid a reversal in the Carnforth area. The proposal was further refined under the Furness Railway Act 1867 (30 & 31 Vict. c. civ), although the line and viaduct did not open for traffic until 26 June 1876.

The Bela Viaduct, described as being the "principal work" on the line, was built at the behest of George Edward Wilson, who objected to the railway spoiling the view from the Dallam Tower Estate, and the railway across the river was to be built upon "arches and pillars". It had 26 arches, with the three-span section over the river being constructed of iron of 70 feet (21 m) to each span, whilst the approach arches were made of stone. Like the viaducts constructed at Eskmeals and over the River Leven which affected the course of their respective rivers, the construction of the viaduct (and railway) allowed the navigable channels in the rivers Kent and Bela to silt up, preventing shipping from using the waterways. The design of the line and viaduct was down to Francis Stileman, who was the resident engineer of the Furness Railway, and the works were carried out by Thomas Nelson.

The line was not used for its intended purpose of shortening the distance for coke trains to the ironworks in south Furness as the railway at Sandside was at sea level, and climbed to 200 feet (61 m) in under 2 miles (3.2 km) (a constant gradient of 1-in-50). The coke traffic still travelled for reversals at Carnforth until the First World War, when heavier traffic at Carnforth prompted the railway company to employ adequate motive power for the trains to use the Hincaster branch. The section of line between Sandside and Hincaster Junction, which included the viaduct, was closed completely in September 1963, and the viaduct was demolished in May 1966.

A two-span viaduct over the River Beela at Whasset known as Beela Viaduct is part of the West Coast Main Line. The alternative spelling for Bela Viaduct on the Hincaster branch was Beela Viaduct employing an alternative spelling of the river name. Another name it acquired was Dallam Bridge, as it crossed the Dallam estate. There was also another viaduct, Belah, on the South Durham and Lancashire Line, which was demolished in 1963.
