= Ashton House =

Ashton House may refer to a number of buildings.

Ireland

- Ashton House, Dublin

United Kingdom

- Ashton House, Cumbria

United States

- Ashton House (Syracuse, New York)
- Ashton House, a building and former student housing cooperative at Swarthmore College
