= Hazelslack =

Hamlet in Cumbria, England

Coordinates: 54.201°N 2.803°W

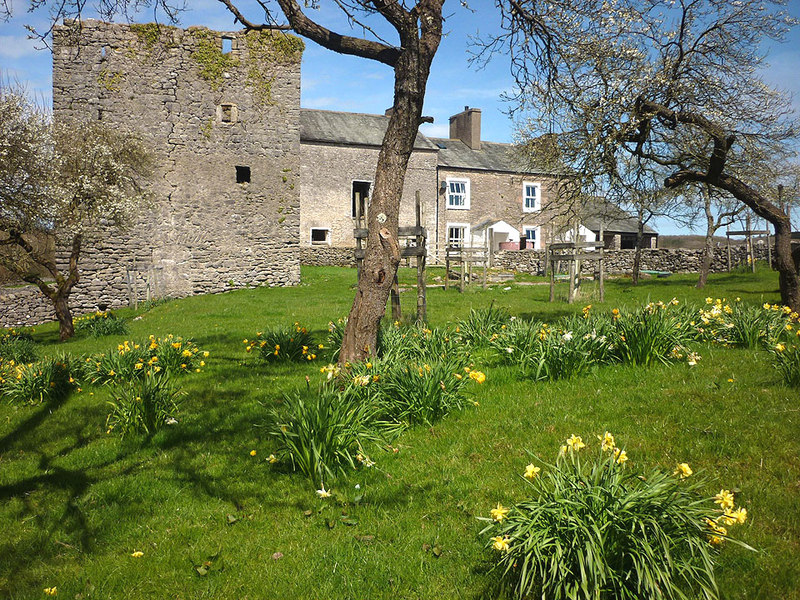
- Daffodils and damsons, Hazelslack Tower

- Location in South Lakeland Location within Cumbria
- OS grid reference: SD476786
- Civil parish: Beetham
- Unitary authority: Westmorland and Furness
- Ceremonial county: Cumbria
- Region: North West
- Country: England
- Sovereign state: United Kingdom
- Post town: MILNTHORPE
- Postcode district: LA7
- Dialling code: 01524
- Police: Cumbria
- Fire: Cumbria
- Ambulance: North West
- UK Parliament: Westmorland and Lonsdale

Hazelslack is a hamlet in the Westmorland and Furness district, in the English county of Cumbria. It is near the villages of Arnside and Storth.

Nearby Hazelslack Tower is the ruins of a 14th-century building, and is Grade II listed. It has been described as a peel tower and is a Scheduled Monument. As of 2014, English Heritage considered the condition of the privately owned tower to be very bad.

Hazelslack also has a camp site.

== See also ==
- Listed buildings in Beetham
