= Heversham railway station =

Former railway station in England

General information
- Location: Cumbria; England
- Coordinates: 54.2373°N 2.7726°W

Other information
- Status: Disused

History
- Original company: Furness Railway
- Pre-grouping: London and North Western Railway
- Post-grouping: London, Midland and Scottish Railway

Key dates
- 1 July 1890: Station opens as Heversham
- 4 May 1942: Station closed
Location

Heversham railway station served the village of Heversham, near Carnforth, with trains to Kendal and Grange over Sands along the Hincaster branch line.

== History ==
Heversham was opened by the Furness Railway in 1890, before being officially part of the London and North Western Railway. However, the station was passed to the London, Midland and Scottish Railway during the Grouping of 1923, only to be closed nineteen years later on 4 May 1942. Four trains were set to run each way. A popular train ran through the station, called the Kendal Tommy, which linked Grange-over-Sands with Kendal. After passenger services ceased, typically six-eight freight trains chugged past the station each day until the line closed in 1966.

== The site today ==
The trackbed is now a footpath and the platform is still visible. The station was demolished.

Preceding station	Disused railways	Following station
Sandside	London and North Western Railway; Hincaster Branch	Oxenholme railway station
