= Sandside =

Sandside or Sand Side may refer to:

- Sandside, Beetham, hamlet in the parish of Beetham, South Lakeland, Cumbria, England

- Sandside railway station, its former station on the Hincaster Branch of the Furness Railway

- Sandside, Ulverston, a location near Ulverston, South Lakeland, Cumbria, England
- Sand Side, one of the hamlets making up Kirkby-in-Furness, South Lakeland, Cumbria, England
- Sandside Bay in the parish of Reay, Caithness, Scotland

- Sandside Chase a clan battle in 1437 at this location
