= Listed buildings in Beetham =

Beetham is a civil parish in Westmorland and Furness, Cumbria, England. It contains 47 listed buildings that are recorded in the National Heritage List for England. Of these, four are listed at Grade I, the highest of the three grades, four are at Grade II*, the middle grade, and the others are at Grade II, the lowest grade. The parish contains the villages of Beetham, Farleton and Hazelslack, and the surrounding countryside. The Lancaster Canal passes through the parish, and the listed buildings associated with this are bridges, an aqueduct and a milestone. Most of the listed buildings in the parish are houses, some of them originally tower houses, and associated structures, farmhouses and farm buildings. The other listed buildings consist of a church, bridges, a former corn mill, milestones and a milepost, boundary stones and a boundary post, a former school, a signal box, and a war memorial.

== Key ==
Grade	Criteria
I	Buildings of exceptional interest, sometimes considered to be internationally important
II*	Particularly important buildings of more than special interest
II	Buildings of national importance and special interest

== Buildings ==
Name and location	Photograph	Date	Notes	Grade
St Michael's Church; 54.20935°N 2.77410°W		12th century or earlier	The church may contain fabric from the Anglo-Saxon era. The south aisle was added in about 1200, the chancel was extended in the 13th century, a chapel was added in the 14th century, the top of the tower dates from the 16th century, and the church was restored and the south porch added in 1872–74. The church is built in stone, mainly limestone, and has sandstone dressings and a lead roof. It consists of a nave with a clerestory, aisles, a south porch, a chancel with a north vestry and a south chapel, and a west tower. The tower has two stages, a 14th-century west doorway, an embattled parapet with crocketed corner pinnacles, and a 20th-century weathervane.	I
Curtain wall, Beetham Hall; 54.20517°N 2.76890°W	—	Medieval	The curtain wall extends to the north of the hall, and roughly forms a rectangle, with a kink at the entrance. It is in stone, about 3 feet (0.91 m) thick, and between 10 feet (3.0 m) and 12 feet (3.7 m) high. At the top is a corbelled parapet, and the wall contains arrow slits. Inside the walls are slots for cruck feet. The curtain wall is also part of a scheduled monument.	II*
Beetham Hall and outbuildings 54.20460°N 2.76866°W		14th century	A fortified house consisting of a hall with cross-wings, linked by 19th-century outbuildings to a farmhouse dated 1693. The buildings are in limestone and the roofs are in green slate with stone ridges. To the rear of the hall is a chapel, and to the rear of the house is a wagon shed and a barn. The farmhouse has two storeys and four bays, and on the front is a gabled porch with copings and ball finials. Above a blocked doorway is a dated and initialled lintel. The windows in the house and in the hall are mullioned. The uninhabited part of the building is part of a scheduled monument.	II*
Hazelslack Tower; 54.20238°N 2.80435°W		Late 14th century	Part of a tower house, the hall has been demolished, and the tower is now a ruin. It is in limestone with some sandstone, and has four incomplete storeys. The building has a complex L-shaped plan, and contains a doorway with a pointed head, loops in the lower parts, and a single two-light window and small square windows above. Inside are fireplaces, the base of a staircase, and garderobes. The building is also a scheduled monument.	II
Dovecote, Parsonage Farmhouse; 54.20961°N 2.77450°W	—	Late 16th or early 17th century	The dovecote is in stone and slate with quoins and it has a green slate roof. The building has a square plan, a doorway in the north gable, and a higher opening in the south gable. Inside are six layers of nesting boxes.	II
Statue, Dallam Tower; 54.22252°N 2.78344°W	—	c. 1640	The statue is a garden feature, and depicts a native wearing feathers, in lead, on a limestone plinth. He is kneeling and holding a circular marble stone with a brass sundial.	I
Marsden Farmhouse; 54.22127°N 2.71528°W	—	17th century (probable)	The farmhouse is roughcast with a green slate roof. It has two storeys and three bays. On the front is a gabled timber porch with a slate roof, and most of the windows are 20th-century casements.	II
Parsonage Farmhouse and stores 54.20974°N 2.77366°W	—	Late 17th century (probable)	The farmhouse incorporates part of what is thought to be a medieval college, consisting of blocked doorway. It is in stone with limestone quoins and has a green slate roof with a stone ridge. The house has two storeys with attics and four bays. Most of the windows date from the 19th century, and on the east front is a trompe-l'œil window.	II
Gate piers, Parsonage Farmhouse; 54.20968°N 2.77337°W	—	Late 17th century (probable)	The gate piers are in sandstone and have a square plan. On the east side is a moulded cornice, and the piers are surmounted by stone balls on square bases.	II
Ashton House; 54.20845°N 2.77428°W		1678	Most of the house dates from alterations in 1774, and pavilions were added later. It is stuccoed on a chamfered plinth, with quoins, modillioned eaves. a parapet, and a green slate roof, and consists of a central block with three storeys and five bays, and flanking two-storey single-bay pavilions. The central doorway has egg and dart moulding and is flanked by Corinthian pilasters with lion-head capitals. Above it is an open pediment containing a coat of arms and a cherub's head. The windows are sashes in architraves The window over the entrance has Ionic pilasters and a carved head above, and the window above it has Composite pilasters and a larger head above.	II*
Garden gateway, Dallam Tower; 54.22053°N 2.78321°W	—	1683	The gateway to the former kitchen garden is in stone, partly rendered, with sandstone dressings, and it has a roof composed of two large slates with a stone ridge. On the north side are pilasters consisting of flat-fronted vases on pedestals, each with an entablature and a pediment. On the south side is a decorative wrought iron gate, and inside the gateway are benches.	II
Farleton House; 54.22242°N 2.71476°W	—	Late 17th or early 18th century (probable)	The house was extended to the rear in the 19th century. It is in roughcast stone and has a green slate roof with copings and a stone ridge. There are two storeys and three bays. The central doorway has a moulded surround and a cornice, and the windows are sashes.	II
Dallam Tower; 54.22254°N 2.78303°W		1722	A country house incorporating earlier material that was extended in 1826 by George Webster. It is stuccoed with sandstone dressings, and has a hipped slate roof. The front is symmetrical and has a central block on a plinth, with quoins, rusticated pilasters, a cornice, and overlapping eaves, and has two storeys with attics and cellars, and seven bays. The central block is flanked by single-storey pavilions, and on the front is a portico with four Doric columns. The doorway has a moulded surround, a fanlight, and the remains of a pediment on consoles. The windows are sashes in stone surrounds, and in the attics are dormers with horizontally-sliding sashes.	I
Footbridge over River Bela; 54.22591°N 2.77866°W	—	1730	Originally a road bridge, and since 1813 a footbridge, it crosses the River Bela. The bridge is in stone, and consists of two segmental arches with cutwaters and pedestrian refuges. The carriageway is 12 feet (3.7 m) wide.	II
Bank barn, Farleton House; 54.22270°N 2.71474°W	—	18th century	The barn was extended at both ends and to the north in the 19th century, giving an L-shaped plan. It is in limestone, with quoins and it has a green slate roof with stone copings and ball finials. In the ground floor on the south side are ten doorways, most with limestone lintels, and above are two winnowing doors and a loading door, all with segmental heads and voussoirs. On the north side are wagon doors, and in the extension are dove holes and round windows.	II
Heron Corn Mill; 54.21292°N 2.77394°W		18th century	The water-powered cornmill was enlarged in the 19th century, it ceased to operate in 1955, and was converted into a museum in 1975. It is in stone with a slate roof, and has an L-shaped plan and three storeys. There is an extension containing a drying kiln. The mill race leads from the River Bela and drives a 14 feet (4.3 m) overshot wheel. The roof is supported by three pairs of upper crucks.	II*
Townend Farm - House and outbuildings 54.22020°N 2.71612°W	—	18th century	The former outbuildings have been incorporated into the house. The building is in stone with limestone dressings, and it has a green slate roof with a stone ridge. The house has two storeys, three bays, a gabled porch with side benches, and sash windows. One outbuilding has a wagon doorway with a segmental-arched head and voussoirs. On the right gable is a finial.	II
Yew Tree Post Office, Yew Tree House and Yew Trees; 54.20903°N 2.77450°W	—	18th century	A row of two houses and a shop, formerly a post office, in limestone with quoins and a green slate roof. They have two storeys, the houses have three bays each, and the shop has one. The shop has a doorway, a shop window with a pointed head, above which is a loading bay with a gabled canopy. The houses have doorways with architraves and segmental pediments on consoles, and the windows are sashes.	II
Gazebo, Ashton House; 54.20874°N 2.77418°W	—	1791	The gazebo is in stone with a slate roof and embattled gables. It has a square plan, two storeys, a door on the south front, a blocked opening in the upper floor on the east front, and external steps leading to a door with a semicircular head on the west front.	II
Barn, Beetham Hall; 54.20492°N 2.76859°W	—	Late 18th or early 19th century (probable)	The barn is in stone with quoins, and has a roof partly in slate, and partly in corrugated metal. There are seven bays and two storeys. The barn contains two wagon entrances with slated canopies, a mullioned window, two doors, and pitching holes.	II
Milnthorpe Bridge; 54.22509°N 2.78500°W		1813	The bridge as provided for the turnpike from Milnthorpe, and carries the B5282 road over the River Bela. It is in limestone and consists of a single segmental arch with a string course and parapets.	II
Aqueduct; 54.22869°N 2.70931°W		c. 1816	The aqueduct carries the Lancaster Canal over Farleton Beck. It is in limestone, and consists of a shallow elliptical arch, with a band and rusticated voussoirs. There are curved retaining walls on the sides.	II
Duke's Bridge; 54.22050°N 2.71866°W		c. 1816	This is bridge No. 155 on the Lancaster Canal, and carries a road over the canal. It is in limestone, and consists of an elliptical arch over the canal and the towpath, and a smaller arch to the east. The bridge has a band, rusticated voussoirs and keystones. The parapets have a curved plan and continue into walls with end piers.	II
Farleton Turnpike Bridge; 54.22310°N 2.71698°W		c. 1816	This is bridge No. 156 on the Lancaster Canal, it was built for the turnpike trust, and now carries the A6070 road over the canal. It is in limestone, and consists of a single elliptical arch with rusticated voussoirs and keystones. The parapets are slightly arched and end in pilasters.	II
Hodgson's Bridge; 54.22380°N 2.71394°W		c. 1816	This is bridge No. 157 on the Lancaster Canal, and it carries Baker's Lane over the canal. It is in limestone, and consists of a single elliptical arch with rusticated voussoirs and keystones. The parapets extend into slightly curving retaining walls ending in pilasters.	II
Thompson's Bridge; 54.22526°N 2.71103°W		c. 1816	This is bridge No. 158 on the Lancaster Canal, carrying a road over the canal. It is in limestone, and consists of a single elliptical arch with a string course, rusticated voussoirs and keystones. The parapets are slightly arched and end in pilasters.	II
Atkinson's Bridge; 54.22608°N 2.71046°W		c. 1816	This is bridge No. 159 on the Lancaster Canal, carrying a track over the canal. It is in limestone, and consists of a single elliptical arch with a string course, rusticated voussoirs and keystones. The parapets are curved in plan, and end in pilasters.	II
Milestone; 54.21791°N 2.71960°W		c. 1816	The milestone is by the towpath of the Lancaster Canal. It is in limestone, and consists of an upright post with a round head. On it are two panels inscribed with numbers representing the distances in miles to Lancaster and to Kendal.	II
Boundary stone 54.22919°N 2.71402°W	—	Early 19th century (probable)	The boundary stone marks the boundary between the parish of Preston Patrick and the former parish of Farleton. The stone is sited on the east side of the A6070 road, and stands against the parapet of Farleton Bridge. It is in limestone, and consists of an upright stone with a rounded top and chamfered edges inscribed with the names of the parishes.	II
Boundary stone 54.21619°N 2.71915°W	—	Early 19th century (probable)	The boundary stone marks the boundary between the parish of Holme and the former parish of Farleton, and is sited on the east side of the A6070 road. It is in limestone, and consists of an upright stone with a rounded top and chamfered edges inscribed with the names of the parishes.	II
Boundary post 54.20687°N 2.73870°W	—	Early 19th century	The boundary post marks the boundary between the parishes of Beetham and Burton-in-Kendal. It is in cast iron and has a half-hexagonal plan, fluted faces, and a domed top, and is inscribed with the names of the parishes.	II
Former Brew and Bakehouse, Dallam Tower; 54.22214°N 2.78267°W		Early 19th century	The building is attached to the south wing of the house, it was designed by George Webster, and has living accommodation above. It is stuccoed with sandstone dressings on a plinth, and has rusticated quoins and a green slate roof. The building has an L-shaped plan, two storeys, an east front of five bays, and a north front of three bays. The windows are mullioned, some also with transoms, and contain sashes. In the east range is a round-headed archway with voussoirs, and on the roof is a small tower surmounted by a cupola and a weathervane.	II
Ice house, Dallam Tower; 54.22323°N 2.78677°W	—	Early 19th century (probable)	The ice house is in stone lined by brick. It has a circular plan, and consists of a domed chamber containing a parapet around a pit with the shape of a truncated cone. The entrance on the south side has slate doors.	II
Orangery, Dallam Tower; 54.22266°N 2.78352°W	—	Early 19th century	The design of the orangery is attributed to George Webster. It has a trefoil plan, a low plinth and a framework of iron holding glass panes. The upright have rosettes, the top rail is moulded, and the roof is curved. The glass panes have scalloped lower edges.	I
Stables and linking block, Dallam Tower; 54.22280°N 2.78372°W	—	Early 19th century	The building was designed by George Webster, it is stuccoed with sandstone dressings, on a plinth, and has rusticated quoins and a hipped slate roof. There are two storeys, each block has five bays, and the windows are sashes. The stable block has a projecting central bay containing a round-headed carriage archway with rusticated voussoirs, and on the roof is a clock tower with a cupola and a weathervane on eight columns.	II
Farleton Bridge; 54.22924°N 2.71404°W	—	Early 19th century	The bridge was provided for the Heronsyke Turnpike, and carries the A6070 road over Farleton Beck. It is in limestone, and consists of a single segmental arch with voussoirs, keystones, coped parapets, and terminal piers.	II
Walls, piers, railings and gate, Farleton House; 54.22236°N 2.71444°W	—	Early 19th century (probable)	The walls are at the front of the garden, they and the piers are in limestone, and the decorative railings and gate are in wrought iron. The end piers are square, on plinths, and have cornices and pyramidal caps.	II
Milestone; 54.21494°N 2.77232°W	—	Early 19th century (probable)	The milestone is on the west side of the A6 road. It is in limestone, and consists of an upright chamfered stone inscribed with the distances in miles to Milnthorpe and to Lancaster. On the top is a benchmark.	II
Milestone; 54.19056°N 2.75305°W	—	Early 19th century (probable)	The milestone is on the west side of the A6 road. It is in limestone, and consists of an upright chamfered stone inscribed with the distances in miles to Milnthorpe and to Lancaster.	II
Milepost; 54.22516°N 2.71670°W		1826	The milepost was provided for the Heronsyke Turnpike. and stands on the east side of the A6070 road. It is in cast iron and has a half-hexagonal plan, fluted faces, and a domed top. In the central face is the date, and the outer faces contain the distances in miles to Burton and to Kendal.	II
Old School; 54.20807°N 2.77141°W		1827	The former school has since been used for other purposes, it is in limestone with quoins and has a green slate roof with a stone ridge. It is in a single storey and has roughly a T-shaped plan, Its openings have pointed heads, and on the southwest gable is a bellcote with a cornice and a pyramidal roof.	II
Deer shed, Dallam Tower; 54.21834°N 2.77711°W	—	c. 1851	The building is in limestone and has a green slate roof with a stone ridge. On three sides is a hipped canopy carried on Tuscan columns.	II
Game Larder, Dallam Tower; 54.22205°N 2.78254°W	—	Late 19th century (probable)	The game larder is in limestone, on a plinth, and has a hipped green slate roof. The building has a rectangular plan, two storeys, stone steps leading up to a first floor entrance on the west front, and windows in the south front.	II
Signal box 54.20358°N 2.82966°W		1897	The signal box was provided for the Furness Railway. It is in carboniferous limestone with dressings in Devonian sandstone, and a hipped slate roof with a terracotta ridge and pointed-ball finials. There are two storeys, the upper storey being slightly jettied, and with continuous glazing at the front and on the sides. External stone steps lead up to the entrance on the south-eastern end. At the rear is a projecting chimney with quoins that is supported by three corbels.	II
War memorial 54.20952°N 2.77330°W		1919	The war memorial, designed by Austin and Paley, stands in an enclosure at a road junction. It is in sandstone, and consists of a Celtic-style cross with a wheel-head and a tapering rectangular shaft on a stepped plinth. The wheel-head is carved with an angel holding a lily, and on the memorial are copper plaques. The wall surrounding the enclosure is in limestone with sandstone dressings, It is about 400 millimetres (16 in) high with a plinth, copings, rectangular balustrades, and elliptical end stops. In the rear wall is a moulded cornice and a memorial tablet with a carved wreath and ribbons.	II
Coach House, Ashton House; 54.20870°N 2.77446°W	—	Undated	The coach house, with lofts, is in limestone and has quoins, projecting eaves, and a green slate roof with a stone ridge. There is a front of five bays, the central bay is gabled, it contains a carriage entrance, and in the gable is an owl hole. On the end gables are pine-cone finials, and on the central gable is a weathervane.	II
