= Listed buildings in Heversham =

Heversham is a civil parish in the Westmorland and Furness district of Cumbria, England. It contains 23 listed buildings that are recorded in the National Heritage List for England. Of these, three are listed at Grade II*, the middle of the three grades, and the others are at Grade II, the lowest grade. The parish contains the village of Heversham and the surrounding countryside. The listed buildings include houses, farmhouses, farm buildings, a church and associated structures, a former school, boundary stones, and a war memorial.

== Key ==
Grade	Criteria
II*	Particularly important buildings of more than special interest
II	Buildings of national importance and special interest

== Buildings ==
Name and location	Photograph	Date	Notes	Grade
St Peter's Church; 54.24373°N 2.77488°W		12th century	The oldest part of the church is the south arcade, and numerous alterations and addition were made in the following centuries, including a restoration in 1869–70 by Paley and Austin. The church is in limestone with sandstone dressings and lead roofs, and is mainly in Perpendicular style. It consists of a nave with north and south aisles and a south porch, a chancel with north and south chapels, and a west tower. The tower has three stages, clasping buttresses, a stair turret to the southwest, and a small spire.	II*
Heversham Hall; 54.24236°N 2.77819°W	—	14th century	The hall was extended and altered in the 16th century and later. It is in stone with sandstone dressings, quoins and a green slate roof with a stone ridge. There are two storeys with attics, and a front of four irregular bays. The doorway has a chamfered surround and a pointed head. In the ground floor are cross windows, and in the upper floor the windows are mullioned. At the rear is an extension with a plinth, a massive round chimney stack, and the ruins of a pele tower.	II*
Barn and shippons, Park House Farm; 54.23701°N 2.77591°W	—	16th century (probable)	The buildings are in stone, with through-stones, and with additions and alterations during the following centuries. The barn has eight bays, and the shippon has three. In the barn, the roof has seven massive upper cruck trusses.	II*
Lower Rowell Farmhouse and Cottage; 54.23724°N 2.74648°W	—	16th century (probable)	The house was later extended to the west and it has been divided into two dwellings. It is roughcast, it has a green slate roof with a stone ridge, and two storeys. The original house has three bays and a doorway with a moulded surround and a four-centred arch. Above to door is a datestone. The windows are mullioned; they and the doorway have hood moulds. The extension is lower, and has three bays and a 20th-century porch and windows.	II
Deepthwaite Bridge; 54.24390°N 2.74034°W	—	17th century (possible)	The bridge carries a road over Stainton Beck, and was rebuilt and widened in about 1890. It is in limestone, and consists of two arches with cutwaters. The bridge has voussoirs and long sloping parapets with copings.	II
Sundial; 54.24351°N 2.77472°W	—	1690	The sundial is in the churchyard of St Peter's Church. It is in sandstone and consists of a square chamfered shaft on two steps on stone slabs, and has a cornice, and a brass dial. The gnomon is missing.	II
Church View Cottage; 54.24351°N 2.77523°W	—	18th century (probable)	The house is in limestone with quoins, a green slate roof, two storeys and two bays. The doorway and ground floor window have segmental heads, and all the windows are 20th-century replacements.	II
Hawthorne Cottage; 54.24349°N 2.77515°W	—	18th century (probable)	A limestone house with a green slate roof, two storeys and two bays. There are two doorways, the left leading to a passage, and the windows date from the 20th century.	II
Post Office; 54.24345°N 2.77507°W	—	18th century (probable)	A stone house with a modillioned eaves cornice and a green slate roof. It has two storeys and three bays. In the centre is a segmental-headed doorway, and the windows are sashes, those in the ground floor with segmental heads.	II
Sunny Vale; 54.24340°N 2.77499°W	—	18th century (probable)	The house is in limestone with a green slate roof, two storeys and three bays. The doorway is recessed in the left bay, and the windows are sashes.	II
Crampton Table Tomb; 54.24350°N 2.77485°W	—	1760	The tomb is in the churchyard of St Peter's Church. On the top is a stone slab, there are panels on the ends and sides, and urns on the corners. The tomb carries inscriptions recording details of members of the Crampton family.	II
Docker Table Tomb; 54.24362°N 2.77496°W	—	1766	The tomb is in the churchyard of St Peter's Church. On the top is a stone slab, and the side panels have lozenge decoration. In the middle and at the corners are panelled pilasters. On the slab is the depiction of a winged angel's head, and inscriptions recording details of members of the Docker family.	II
Dickinson Table Tomb; 54.24354°N 2.77471°W	—	1770 (probable)	The tomb is in the churchyard of St Peter's Church. On the top is a stone slab. There are panels on the sides and ends with lozenge decoration, and at the west end are angels' heads with wings. The tomb carries inscriptions recording details of members of the Dickinson family.	II
Chestnut House and cottage 54.24333°N 2.77490°W	—	1772	Originally a school house with the cottage added to the south and expanded later. The building is in stone and has a green slate roof with a stone ridge and three storeys. The house has three bays and a doorway with reeded pilasters and an entablature. The cottage has one bay and a doorway with a plain surround. The windows are sashes, those in the lower two floors with voussoirs.	II
Boundary stone 54.25151°N 2.77476°W	—	1804 (probable)	The stone marks the boundary between the parishes of Heversham and Levens. It is in limestone, and consists of an upright stone with a round head and widely chamfered corners, and it is inscribed with the names of the parishes.	II
Plumtree Hall; 54.24578°N 2.77477°W	—	c.1815	A limestone house with rusticated quoins, overlapping eaves and a hipped green slate roof. The main block has three storeys and three bays, and is flanked by two-storey pavilions. In the centre is a projecting porch that has Ionic columns and an entablature. The doorway has moulded impost blocks and a traceried fanlight. The windows are sashes.	II
Boundary stone 54.24704°N 2.75112°W		Early 19th century (probable)	The stone marks the boundary between the parishes of Heversham and Hincaster. It is in limestone and consists of upright stone with widely chamfered corners inscribed with the names of the parishes.	II
Old School; 54.24432°N 2.77494°W	—	1838	The school was provided for girls and infants, and was extended in 1841 and in 1903. It is in stone and has a slate roof with a stone ridge. It is in a single storey, and has a gable to the left. The windows have trefoil heads and hood moulds.	II
Old School House; 54.24433°N 2.77465°W	—	1841	The house is rendered with limestone dressings, it has a green slate roof with a stone ridge, and is in Gothick style. There are two storeys and a single-storey extension to the left. On the front are two gables, and the right part is jettied on a limestone lintel and two piers. The windows have chamfered surrounds and mullions.	II
Boundary stone 54.23059°N 2.74434°W	—	Mid 19th century (probable)	The boundary stone is in limestone and consists of a slab with a round head. It has a central panel with the incised initials "HM".	II
Boundary stone 54.23885°N 2.75434°W	—	Mid 19th century (probable)	The boundary stone is in limestone and consists of a slab with a round head. It has a central panel with the incised initials "HM".	II
Lych gate, St Peter's Church; 54.24345°N 2.77479°W		1894	The lych gate is at the entry to the churchyard. It consists of two sandstone piers on chamfered plinths. Between these is a timber pier, and they support a roof of stone-slates with a stone ridge. The west pier carries an inscription.	II
War memorial 54.24354°N 2.77490°W		1920	The war memorial is in the churchyard of St Peter's Church. It is in sandstone, and in the form of a Celtic cross. On the south face is an inscription and the names of those lost in both World Wars.	II
