= Hale, Cumbria =

Hamlet in Westmorland & Furness, England

Coordinates: 54.200°N 2.760°W

Hale
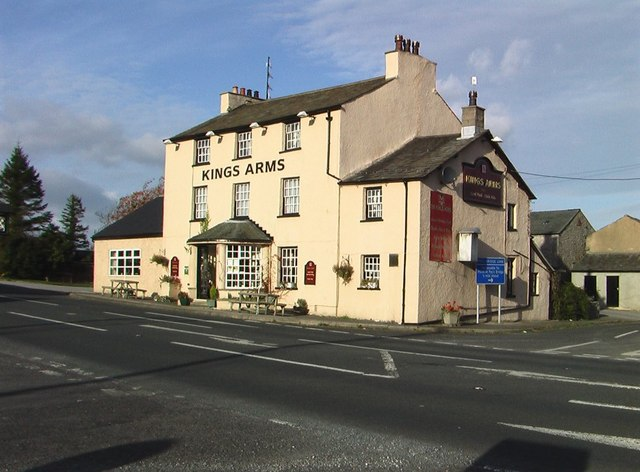
- The Kings Arms (now The Tavern at Hale), on the A6, seen in 2007

- Location in South Lakeland Location within Cumbria
- OS grid reference: SD504785
- Civil parish: Beetham
- Unitary authority: Westmorland and Furness
- Ceremonial county: Cumbria
- Region: North West
- Country: England
- Sovereign state: United Kingdom
- Post town: MILNTHORPE
- Postcode district: LA7
- Dialling code: 015395
- Police: Cumbria
- Fire: Cumbria
- Ambulance: North West
- UK Parliament: Westmorland and Lonsdale

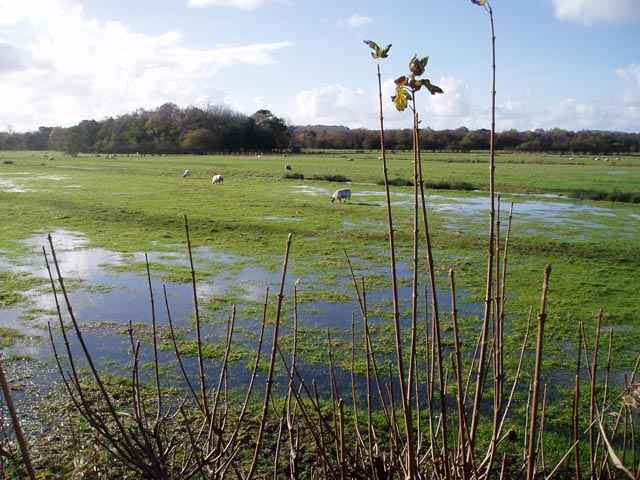
Hale Moss, photographed in 2005

Hale is a hamlet near Beetham in the south of Cumbria, England. It lies on the A6 road, between Carnforth to the south and Milnthorpe to the north. It is in the civil parish of Beetham in the Westmorland and Furness local government district.

Hale is within the Arnside and Silverdale Area of Outstanding Natural Beauty, and Hale Moss Nature Reserve and Hale Moss Caves, both lying to the south of the hamlet, are Sites of Special Scientific Interest.

The Lakeland Wildlife Oasis, a small zoo whose highlights include snow leopards and leafcutter ants is at Hale. The hamlet is also home to an 1810 coaching inn, formerly The Kings Arms but renamed The Tavern at Hale.

== Notable residents ==
John Taylor (1808-1887), the third president of the Church of Jesus Christ of Latter-day Saints (the Mormons) lived at Yew Tree House, Hale, (which still stands, to the east of the A6) after his father James Taylor moved there with his family in 1819. A plaque outside the house commemorates this.
