= Listed buildings in Milnthorpe =

Milnthorpe is a civil parish in the Westmorland and Furness district of Cumbria, England. It contains 13 listed buildings that are recorded in the National Heritage List for England. All the listed buildings are designated at Grade II, the lowest of the three grades, which is applied to "buildings of national importance and special interest". The parish contains the large village of Milnthorpe and the surrounding countryside. The listed buildings consist of houses with associated structures, bridges, a hotel, a folly, a market cross, and a boundary post and boundary stones.

== Buildings ==
Name and location	Photograph	Date	Notes
Footbridge; 54.22592°N 2.77865°W		1730	The bridge crosses the River Bela. It was a road bridge until 1813, and since then a footbridge. The bridge is in stone, and consists of two segmental arches. It has cutwaters, pedestrian refuges, voussoirs and copings, and a carriageway 12 feet (3.7 m) wide.
Market Cross; 54.22668°N 2.77215°W		18th century (possible)	The oldest parts are probably the shaft and the base, with the upper parts dating from the 19th century. The cross is in sandstone on six hexagonal limestone steps. It has an octagonal base on which stands a round shaft with an octagonal cornice surmounted by a ball.
Milnthorpe Bridge; 54.22509°N 2.78500°W		1813	The bridge as provided for the turnpike from Milnthorpe, and carries the B5282 road over the River Bela. It is in limestone and consists of a single segmental arch with a string course and parapets.
3–13 Park Road; 54.22672°N 2.77380°W	—	Early 19th century	A terrace of houses and shops in stone with green slate roofs. There are two storeys and ten irregular bays. In No. 3 is a shop front. Most of the windows are sashes. Between Nos. 9 and 11 is a carriage arch with voussoirs and impost blocks.
Cross Keys Hotel; 54.22669°N 2.77334°W		Early 19th century	The hotel, on a corner site, possibly incorporates parts of an earlier inn. It is in limestone on a plinth and has corniced gutters on brackets, and a green slate roof with blue glazed roof tiles. The building has a curved plan, three storeys and six bays. The doorway has pilasters, an entablature and a cornice, and there is a similar blocked doorway to the right. The windows are sashes.
Laburnum House; 54.22712°N 2.76929°W		Early 19th century	A house with stables at the rear, later converted into a cottage, that was refronted in about 1850. It is in limestone on a plinth with a sill band, quoins, and a green slate roof with a stone ridge. There are two storeys and three bays. The ground floor is rusticated, and contains a central doorway with a fanlight, impost blocks, and a cornice, and is flanked by bay windows. In the upper floor are sash windows.
Boundary Post; 54.22727°N 2.76038°W	—	After 1830	The boundary post is in cast iron, and is half-hexagonal with a fluted face and a domed top. It carries inscriptions, including the names of former parishes.
St Anthony's Tower; 54.23292°N 2.77039°W		1832	A folly in the form of a tower, it is in stone and has a circular plan. There are two storeys, five windows, and a corniced parapet. The doors are approached by extremal stone steps. On the south side us a window and elsewhere are slit openings.
1–5 Church Street; 54.22699°N 2.77361°W		19th century	A terrace of houses. later used for other purposes, including a bank and a shop. It is in limestone, with ogee gutters on brackets, and a green slate roof, hipped at the corner, with blue glazed ridge tiles, and containing 20th-century roof lights. There are three storeys and five bays. The bank to the left has a door with a hood on brackets, to the right is a door with a fanlight and a cornice, and further to the right is a shop front with an entablature and consoles. The right bay contains a carriage arch with voussoirs and impost blocks. Most of the windows are sashes.
9 Haverflatts Lane; 54.22766°N 2.77107°W		Mid 19th century	A limestone house on a plinth with quoins, a sill band, and a green slate roof with a stone ridge. There are two storeys and a symmetrical front of three bays. In the centre is a prostyle porch with Tuscan pilasters, moulded impost blocks, and a round-headed doorway with a fanlight. The windows are sashes.
Boundary stone 54.23059°N 2.74434°W	—	Mid 19th century (probable)	The boundary stone is in limestone and consists of a slab with a round head. It has a central panel with the incised initials "HM".
Boundary stone 54.23885°N 2.75434°W	—	Mid 19th century (probable)	The boundary stone is in limestone and consists of a slab with a round head. It has a central panel with the incised initials "HM".
Harmony Hall, garden wall and gate piers 54.22742°N 2.76908°W		19th century	The house is in sandstone on a plinth, with quoins, corniced parapets, and a green slate roof. It has two storeys and three bays. There is a central doorway with Ionic pilasters, a pediment, and a semicircular fanlight, and this is flanked by canted bay windows. In the upper floor are sash windows, and to the south is a conservatory. In front of the house are stone walls and gate piers.
