= Farleton, Cumbria =

Village in Cumbria, England

Coordinates: 54.222°N 2.717°W

Farleton
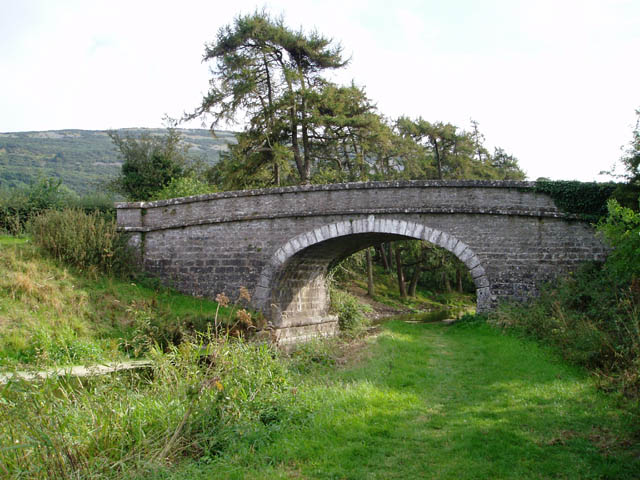
- Atkinson's Bridge, Farleton

- Location in the former South Lakeland local government area Location within Cumbria
- OS grid reference: NY533810
- Civil parish: Beetham
- Unitary authority: Westmorland and Furness
- Ceremonial county: Cumbria
- Region: North West
- Country: England
- Sovereign state: United Kingdom
- Post town: CARNFORTH
- Postcode district: LA6
- Dialling code: 015395
- Police: Cumbria
- Fire: Cumbria
- Ambulance: North West
- UK Parliament: Westmorland and Lonsdale

Farleton is a village and former civil parish, now in the parish of Beetham, in the Westmorland and Furness local government district, Cumbria, England. In 1931 the parish had a population of 67.

Historically within the county of Westmorland, Farleton lies near Milnthorpe, just to the east of the main A6070 road, from which it is divided by the Lancaster Canal, some 8 1/2 miles (13.7 km) south of Kendal. Farleton used to have one public house called 'the Duke' after the Grand Old Duke of York but this was turned into a dwelling house in the early part of the twentieth century. With Farleton there is a small river and one post box. There is also a limestone kiln and the remains of a limestone quarry.

Farleton was formerly a township in Beetham parish, from 1866 Farleton was a civil parish in its own right until it was abolished on 1 April 1935 and merged with Beetham.

== See also ==
- Listed buildings in Beetham
