= William Hutton (antiquary) =

English antiquarian

- Born: 1736?
- Died: 1811
- Occupation: Antiquarian

William Hutton (1736?–1811) was an English antiquarian.

== Biography ==
Hutton was born in 1735 or 1736, the second son of George Hutton (d. 1736) of Overthwaite in the parish of Beetham, Westmoreland, by Eleanor, daughter of William Tennant of York and Bedale, Yorkshire (Burke, Landed Gentry, 7th ed. i. 962). In 1760, he became curate and in September 1762 rector of Beetham (a family living). He died in August 1811 (Gent. Mag. 1811, pt. ii. p. 291). By his wife Lucy, third daughter of Rigby Molyneux, M.P. for Preston, he had two sons. He wrote a curious tract in imitation of the provincial dialect entitled 'A Bran New Wark, by William de Worfat [Overthwaite], containing a true Calendar of his Thoughts concerning good nebberhood. Now first printed fra his M.S. for the use of the hamlet of Woodland,' of which fifty copies were printed at Kendal in 1785. Another edition was subsequently issued with a few variations. The tract was reprinted by the English Dialect Society in 1879. Hutton kept a large folio book called the 'Repository' in the vestry of Beetham Church, in which he entered a record of parish affairs from an early period (Burn and Nicolson, Westmoreland and Cumberland, i. 219). It has been carefully preserved and continued by his successors.
