= Whasset =

Hamlet in Cumbria, England

Coordinates: 54.222°N 2.754°W

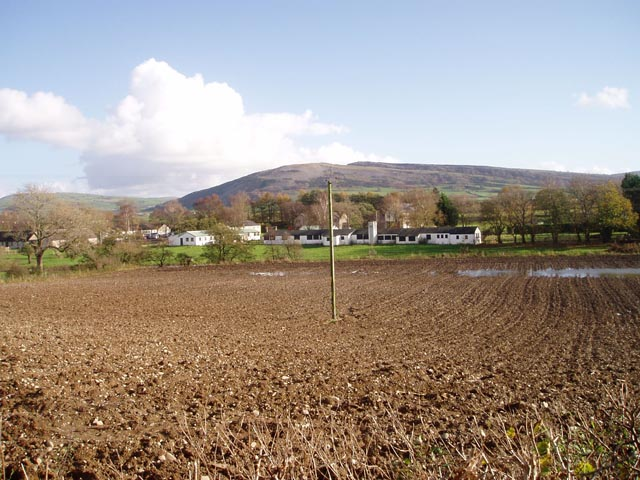
- The Wings School seen across fields near Whasset, in 2005

- Location in South Lakeland Location within Cumbria
- OS grid reference: SD508809
- Civil parish: Beetham
- Unitary authority: Westmorland and Furness
- Ceremonial county: Cumbria
- Region: North West
- Country: England
- Sovereign state: United Kingdom
- Post town: MILNTHORPE
- Postcode district: LA7
- Dialling code: 015395
- Police: Cumbria
- Fire: Cumbria
- Ambulance: North West
- UK Parliament: Westmorland and Lonsdale

Whasset or Whassett is a hamlet near Milnthorpe in Westmorland and Furness, Cumbria, England. It is in the historic county of Westmorland. It is in the parish of Beetham and lies south of Ackenthwaite.

The spelling Whasset, with single "t", is used on Ordnance Survey's 1:50,000 and 1:25,000 maps and by Beetham Parish Council. The spelling Whassett, with double "t", is used by the Royal Mail and some other sources.

To the south of the hamlet, beside the River Bela, is the Wings School, a residential school for 60 students aged 11 to 17 with social, emotional, behavioural and associated difficulties. It occupies the site of Bela River Camp, a World War II prisoner of war camp which was later used as a prison.
