= Hincaster =

Hamlet and civil parish in Cumbria, England

Coordinates: 54.256°N 2.755°W

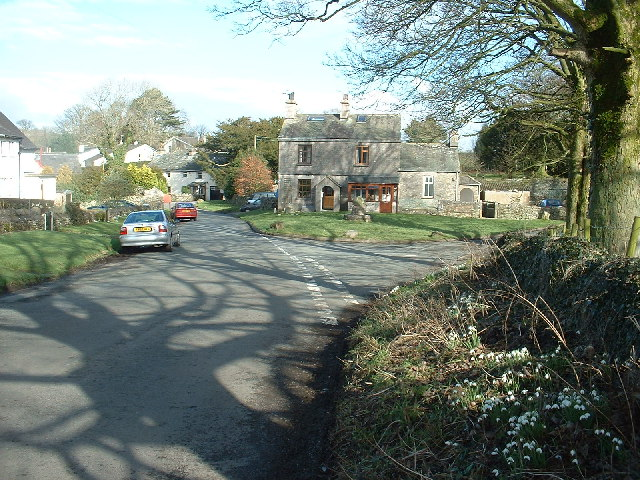
- Hincaster

- Location within Cumbria
- Population: 209 (2011)
- OS grid reference: SD5084
- Civil parish: Hincaster
- Unitary authority: Westmorland and Furness
- Ceremonial county: Cumbria
- Region: North West
- Country: England
- Sovereign state: United Kingdom
- Post town: MILNTHORPE
- Postcode district: LA7
- Dialling code: 01539
- Police: Cumbria
- Fire: Cumbria
- Ambulance: North West
- UK Parliament: Westmorland and Lonsdale

Hincaster is a small hamlet and civil parish in the Unitary Authority of Westmorland and Furness Cumbria, England, located between Kendal and Milnthorpe. In the 2001 census the parish had a population of 195, increasing at the 2011 census to 209.

"Caster" often suggests a Roman origin (from the Old English cæster and Latin castrum for "fort"), but no Roman remains are known at Hincaster. Hincaster is most famous for the 19th century Hincaster Tunnel (currently dewatered) which is the longest tunnel on the Lancaster Canal.

== Transport ==
=== Hincaster Tunnel ===
Work to extend the canal from Tewitfield to Kendal began in 1813. The building of the tunnel through Hincaster Hill brought the canal close to gunpowder works at Sedgwick (an 18th century gunpowder works was replaced in the 19th century).

The tunnel is 378 yards (346 m) long. The tunnel's entrances, the east and west portals, are faced with limestone and are Grade II listed. The tunnel itself is lined with something like four million bricks. The bricks were made from clay dug at Mosside Farm, on the canalside about 0.5 miles (0.80 km) south south east of Milness, by the present A65. On 4 February 1817, it was reported that 'two million bricks had been made and half the length of the tunnel completed'. The Mosside brickworks, were too efficient, for in 1818, Thomas Fletcher, the canal engineer, put up for sale 100,000 bricks, left over from the tunnel. These clay pits and the brickworks were resuscitated in 1845, employing over 100 men and 30 horses; these bricks were made for the new Lancaster and Carlisle Railway.

Navvies, the tough canal 'navigators' who were to dig the Hincaster section, attended the contract meeting in Kendal, afterwards causing a considerable riot in the town'. The Westmorland Advertiser promptly declared 'Sound policy demands that the ruffians should be held as an example to the unruly multitude which the culling of the canal will shortly bring to this populous neighbourhood'.

=== Hincaster Branch Railway ===
The Hincaster Branch was a single track railway branch line of the Furness Railway which ran from Arnside on the Furness main line to a junction with the Lancaster and Carlisle Railway (later the London and North Western Railway) at Hincaster Junction (Conolly, 1997). Intermediate stations were provided at Sandside and Heversham. The branch was opened in 1867, but passenger services ended on 4 May 1942 and the track between Sandside and Hincaster Junction was lifted in 1966. A short stub from Arnside to Sandside lasted into the 1970s to serve local quarries.

== See also ==
- Listed buildings in Hincaster
