= Ashton House, Cumbria =

Coordinates: 54.20845°N 2.77431°W

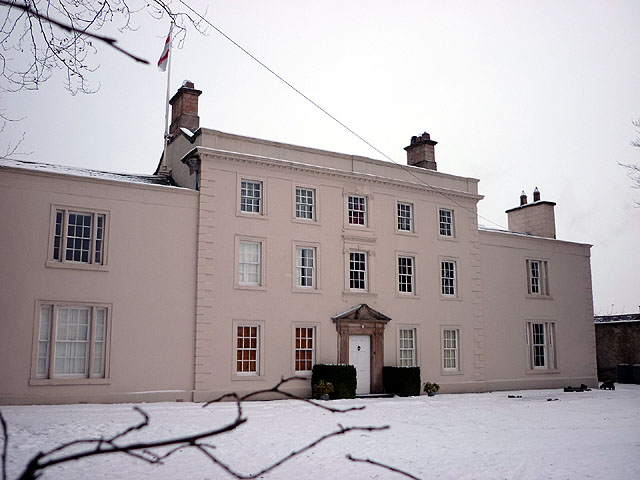
Ashton House in Beetham

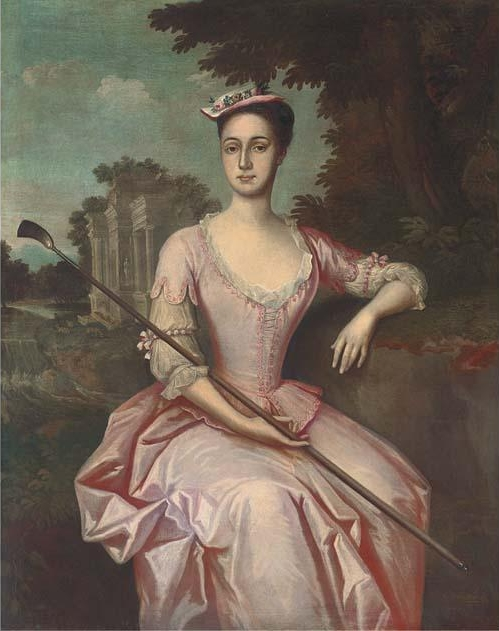
Mary Yeats of Ashton House

Ashton House is a large country house in Beetham in Cumbria. It is a Grade II* listed building.

== History ==
The house was built in 1678 probably for John and Sarah Yeats whose daughter, Mary Yeats, died there at the age of 25 in the mid 18th century. It was inherited by John Yeats Thexton in the first part of the 19th century, by Edward Yeats Thexton in the latter part of the 19th century, and then passed to Charles Frith-Hudson, who had married into the Thexton family, at the start of the 20th century. It became a wedding venue in the 21st century.

== See also ==
- Listed buildings in Beetham
