= Sandside, Beetham =

Hamlet in Cumbria, England

Coordinates: 54.222°N 2.799°W

Sandside
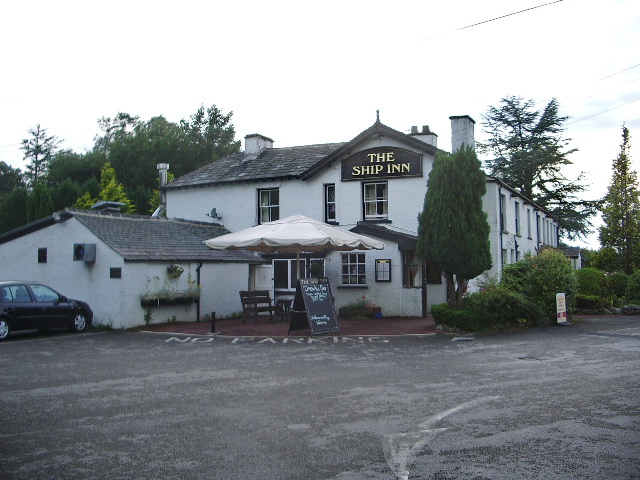
- The Ship Inn public house, photographed in 2008

- Location in the former South Lakeland district Location within Cumbria
- OS grid reference: SD479810
- Civil parish: Beetham
- Unitary authority: Westmorland and Furness
- Ceremonial county: Cumbria
- Region: North West
- Country: England
- Sovereign state: United Kingdom
- Post town: MILNTHORPE
- Postcode district: LA7
- Dialling code: 015395
- Police: Cumbria
- Fire: Cumbria
- Ambulance: North West
- UK Parliament: Westmorland and Lonsdale

Sandside is a hamlet near Storth in Beetham parish, Westmorland and Furness, Cumbria, England. Historically in Westmorland, it lies on the south shore of the estuary of the River Kent, between Arnside and Milnthorpe. There is one pub, The Ship Inn, (closed December 2020) which is believed to date from 1671, one restaurant, The Kingfisher, which closed in September 2021 and several commercial businesses.

Sandside lies within the Arnside and Silverdale Area of Outstanding Natural Beauty. A "Geotrail" leaflet has been published to guide visitors around the geology of the area. Sandside quarry has operated since at least 1901, and is now operated by Lafarge Tarmac, producing aggregate and asphalt.

Sandside railway station, on the Hincaster Branch of the Furness Railway, was built in 1876 by Lancaster architects Paley and Austin. The line closed to passengers in 1942 and the station has been demolished.

Until the building of the Arnside viaduct in 1857, Milnthorpe (upstream of Sandside) was a substantial port, handling cargoes including coal and guano. Its customs house was at Sandside, still existing as Crown Cottage with a datestone of 1728. Builders' merchants and other commercial operations occupy sites along the riverside which were previously used by the merchants of the port.
