= Listed buildings in Hincaster =

Hincaster is a civil parish in Westmorland and Furness, Cumbria, England. It contains eleven listed buildings that are recorded in the National Heritage List for England. Of these, one is listed at Grade II*, the middle of the three grades, and the others are at Grade II, the lowest grade. The parish contains the village of Hincaster and the surrounding countryside. The Lancaster Canal passed through the parish, including the Hincaster Tunnel. This part of the canal is now dry, but structures associated with it are listed, including the portals of the tunnel, a cottage, and accommodation bridges and a railway bridge crossing the canal or the sunken horse path (which is a Scheduled Monument). The other listed buildings are farmhouses and farm buildings.

== Key ==
Grade	Criteria
II*	Particularly important buildings of more than special interest
II	Buildings of national importance and special interest

== Buildings ==
Name and location	Photograph	Date	Notes	Grade
Hincaster Hall; 54.25678°N 2.75927°W		Late 16th century	A farmhouse that was altered later, and an extension added to the right in the 18th century. It is in stone and has a green slate roof with a stone ridge, and chimney pots with round shafts. The house has two storeys, and each part has three bays. On the front of the original part is a gabled stone porch with a ball finial, and the windows have chamfered surrounds and mullions with hood moulds above. In the extension is a doorway with a segmental head and voussoirs, and the windows are 19th-century casements.	II*
Well Heads Farmhouse; 54.26793°N 2.74674°W	—	17th century	The farmhouse is in roughcast stone and has a green slate roof with a stone ridge. There are two storeys with attics and five bays, and the windows are 20th-century casements. Inside are two upper cruck trusses.	II
High Barns Farmhouse; 54.25810°N 2.76544°W	—	Early 18th century (probable)	The farmhouse was later extended. It is in roughcast stone with a green slate roof. There are three storeys, three bays, a single-storey extension to the left, and an outshut at the rear. The windows are mullioned and contain casements, and on the front is a 20th-century gabled porch.	II
Barn, Sellet Hall; 54.26309°N 2.74078°W	—	1746	This consists of a barn, shippons and a hay loft. The building is in stone with through-stones, and has a green slate roof with a stone ridge and stone coping on the west gable. The barn has a T-shaped plan, an east front of eight bays, and a rear extension. The main range contains windows, doors and loading doors, and in the extension in a cart entrance in both sides, ventilation slits, and a mullioned window.	II
Accommodation bridge 54.25887°N 2.75335°W		1817	The accommodation bridge crosses the sunken horse path to the east of the western portal of Hincaster Tunnel. It is in limestone, and consists of a horseshoe arch with voussoirs, and has ramped parapets.	II
Accommodation bridge and East Portal, Hincaster Tunnel; 54.26203°N 2.74137°W		1817	The accommodation bridge crosses the sunken horse path to the west of the eastern portal of Hincaster Tunnel. The tunnel carried the Lancaster Canal, which is now dry. Both the bridge and the portal have horseshoe arches with rusticated voussoirs and keystones. The portal also has flanking tapering pilasters.	II
West Portal, Hincaster Tunnel; 54.25896°N 2.75521°W		1817	The tunnel carried the Lancaster Canal, which is now dry. The portal is in limestone, and consists of a horseshoe arch with rusticated voussoirs and a keystone, and is flanked by tapering pilasters.	II
Sellet Hall Bridge; 54.26202°N 2.74136°W		1818	An accommodation bridge over the Lancaster Canal, which is now dry. It is in limestone, and consists of a single elliptical arch with rusticated voussoirs and keystones. The bridge has arched parapets, and is about 10 metres (33 ft) wide.	II
Canal Cottage; 54.25880°N 2.75576°W	—	c. 1820	A house and stables in limestone with quoins, and a Westmorland slate roof with coped gables. It has a linear plan, with two storeys and attics, five bays, and a two-bay single-storey extension to the right. The house occupies two bays and has sash windows and a lean-to porch. In the centre is a wide stable doorway with a stone lintel, and there are external steps leading to a first floor doorway.	II
Barn, Hincaster Hall; 54.25707°N 2.75931°W	—	Early 19th century (probable)	The bank barn is in stone, the east gable has been rebuilt in brick, and the roof is in green slate with a stone ridge and ball finials at the ends. It contains a cart entrance on both sides, a board door with a segmental head and limestone voussoirs, and square ventilation holes.	II
Railway bridge over sunken horse path 54.25945°N 2.74981°W		c.1846	The bridge was built for the Lancaster and Carlisle Railway and now carries the West Coast Main Line over the sunken horse path. The portals are in limestone and it has a brick barrel vault. The arches are rusticated and have bands and keystones. There are retaining walls on the west side.	II
