= Hincaster Tunnel =

Canal tunnel on the Lancaster Canal

Coordinates: 54°15′33″N 2°45′08″W

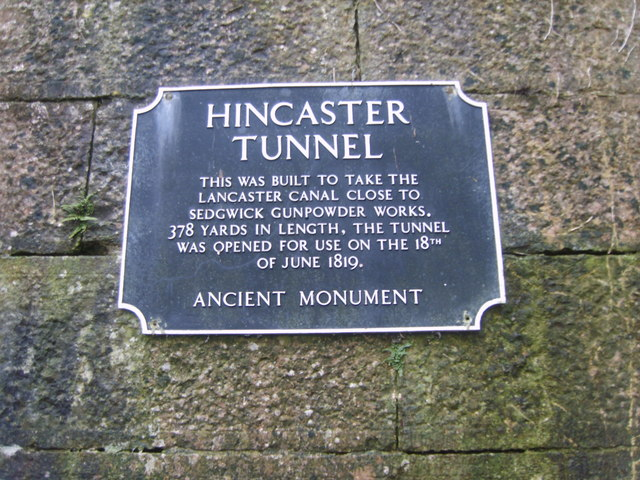
Plaque

The Hincaster Tunnel is a canal tunnel on the Lancaster Canal at Hincaster, a hamlet in Cumbria, England.

== History ==
Work to extend the Lancaster Canal north from Tewitfield to Kendal began formally in 1813. This section, which includes the tunnel, opened in 1819.

The building of the tunnel through Hincaster Hill brought the canal close to existing gunpowder works at Sedgwick (an 18th-century gunpowder works there was replaced in the 19th century).

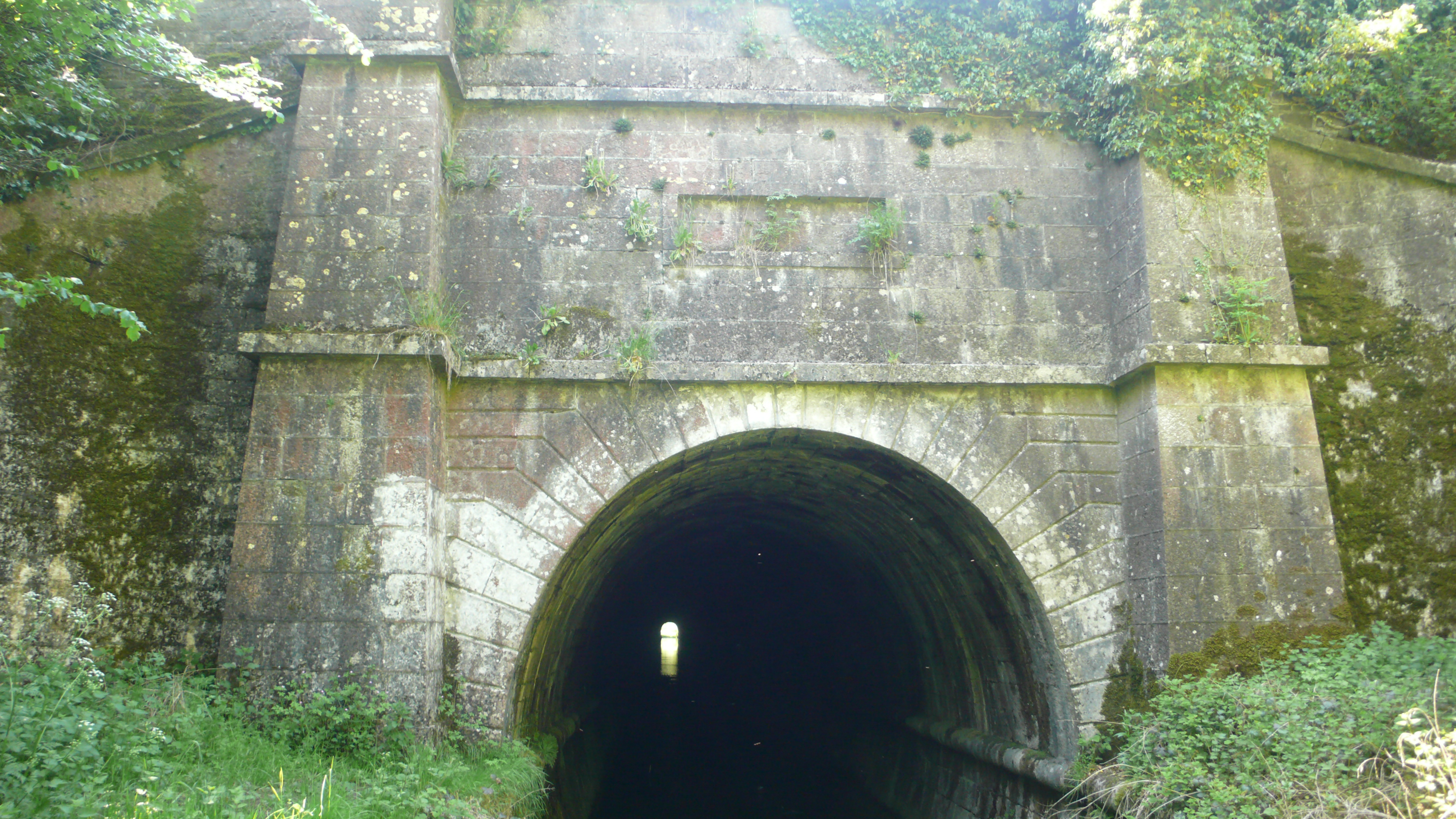
The tunnel (east portal)

The tunnel closed to traffic in the 20th century along with the northern section of the canal.

== Structure ==
The tunnel is 378 yards (346 m) long. The tunnel's entrances, the east and west portals, are faced with limestone and are Grade II listed. The tunnel itself is lined with something like four million bricks.

There is no towpath through the tunnel. Horses were led over the hill via a horse path which is a scheduled monument.
