= Heron Corn Mill =

Water mill in Beetham, Cumbria, England

Coordinates: 54°12′47″N 2°46′26″W

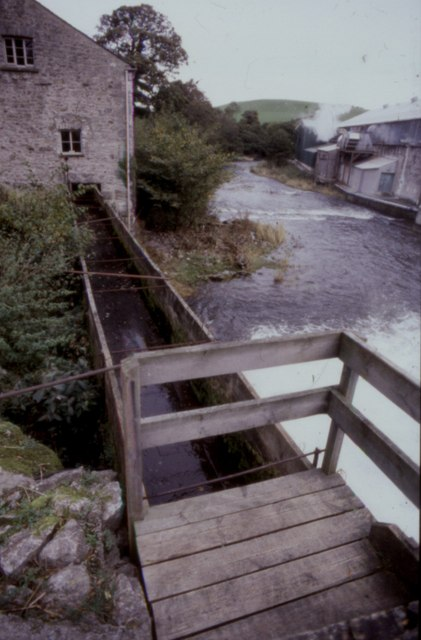
The sluice head and leat, with the river Bela

The Heron Corn Mill is a working 18th-century water mill on the River Bela at Beetham, Cumbria, England. The mill and its mill race are Grade II* listed, and in 2013 it was awarded a £939,000 grant from the Heritage Lottery Fund for major restoration work.

The mill is open to visitors, with regular opportunities to see flour being milled. The 18th century barn is used as a venue for a range of community and educational activities.

Within the mill site there is also a Kaplan turbine generating hydroelectricity, some of which is sold to the BillerudKorsnäs paper mill across the river.

A fish ladder bypassing the weir allows salmon to pass up the river to breed.

== See also ==
- Grade II* listed buildings in Westmorland and Furness
- Listed buildings in Beetham
