= St Peter's Church, Heversham =

Coordinates: 54.24373°N 2.77484°W

St Peter's Church
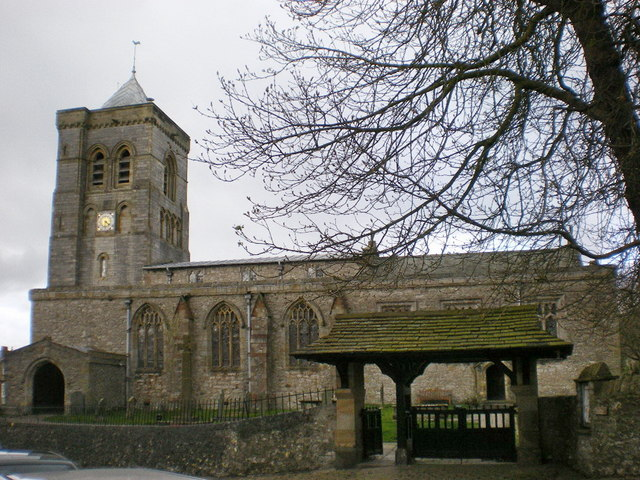
- St Peter's Church from the south

- Location in South Lakeland Location in Cumbria
- OS grid reference: SD 496,834
- Location: Heversham, Cumbria
- Country: England
- Denomination: Anglican
- Website: St Peter, Heversham

History
- Status: Parish church
- Dedication: Saint Peter

Architecture
- Functional status: Active
- Heritage designation: Grade II*
- Designated: 12 February 1962
- Architect: Paley and Austin (restoration)
- Architectural type: Church
- Style: Norman, Perpendicular, Gothic Revival
- Completed: 1868

Specifications
- Materials: Limestone and sandstone

Administration
- Province: York
- Diocese: Carlisle
- Archdeaconry: Westmorland and Furness
- Deanery: Kendal
- Parish: Heversham

Clergy
- Vicar: Revd Susan Elizabeth Wilson

St Peter's Church is in the village of Heversham, Cumbria, England. It is an active Anglican parish church in the deanery of Kendal, the archdeaconry of Westmorland and Furness, and the diocese of Carlisle. The church is recorded in the National Heritage List for England as a designated Grade II* listed building.

The parish was formerly much larger than now, and the church stands on one of the oldest Christian sites in the historic county of Westmorland. Its benefice is united with that of St Thomas, Milnthorpe.

== History ==
The oldest fabric in the present church dates from the 12th century. Additions and alterations were made during the 14th, 15th and 16th centuries. Rebuilding took place following a fire in 1601. A considerable restoration was undertaken in 1868 by the Lancaster architects Paley and Austin, who also added the tower. The restoration included rebuilding the north arcade, partly rebuilding the chancel arch, renewing the roofs of the chancel, and the aisles, and replacing the seating in the church.

== Architecture ==
=== Exterior ===
The church is constructed mainly in limestone rubble with sandstone dressings, the vestry and the east wall of the chancel being in sandstone. The roofs are covered in lead. The plan of the church consists of a three-bay nave with a clerestory, a two-bay chancel, north and south aisles with chapels at the east ends, a north vestry, a south porch, and a west tower. The tower is in three stages with buttresses, a pyramidal roof, and a southwest stair turret. The architectural style of the body of the church is Perpendicular. The south arcade is Norman. The tower is in Early English style.

=== Interior ===
Most of the furnishings were designed by Paley and Austin, including the alabaster reredos. The screen in the north chapel dates from 1605. The south door is medieval, dating from about 1300. In the porch is a portion of an Anglo-Saxon cross dating from the late 8th century, carved with vine scrolls and beasts. Some of the stained glass in the south chapel is dated 1601. The glass in the east window was designed by William Warrington in 1844, and the glass in the south windows is mainly by Clayton and Bell. In the north chapel is a window dated 1914 by Shrigley and Hunt, and the west window of 1924 is by A. K. Nicholson. The church contains a number of monuments, the oldest dated 1626. There is a ring of six bells, all cast in 1870 by John Warner & Sons.

==== Organ ====
An organ was destroyed in the fire of 1601, and another organ is said to have been destroyed in the Civil War in about 1644. The present three-manual organ is housed in a carved wooden case dated 1887 and is by Wilkinson of Kendal. It incorporates an instrument from earlier in the 19th century. Improvements and repairs were undertaken on the present organ in 1925 and 1952, each time by Wilkinson. In 1979 Rushworth and Dreaper restored and extended it, and a complete overhaul was carried out in 1995 by David Wells at a cost of about £38,000.

== External features ==
In the churchyard are a number of structures that have been designated as Grade II listed buildings. To the south of the church is a cross erected in 1920 as a memorial to those who died in the First World War. It is in the form of a Celtic cross, and was designed by J. F. Curwen. The lych gate is dated 1894 and has sandstone piers with timber above, and a slate roof with a stone ridge. Immediately to the south of the church is a table tomb to the Docker family, the earliest inscribed date being 1766. To the south of this is another table tomb, this one being to the Crampton family, with an earliest date of 1760. To the southeast of the church is a table tomb to the Dickinson family with an earliest date of 1763, although it was probably not erected until 1770. To the south of the Dickinson tomb is a sandstone sundial dated 1690.

== See also ==
- Grade II* listed buildings in Westmorland and Furness
- Listed buildings in Heversham
- List of ecclesiastical works by Paley and Austin
