= Slack Head =

Hamlet in Cumbria, England

Coordinates: 54.202°N 2.779°W

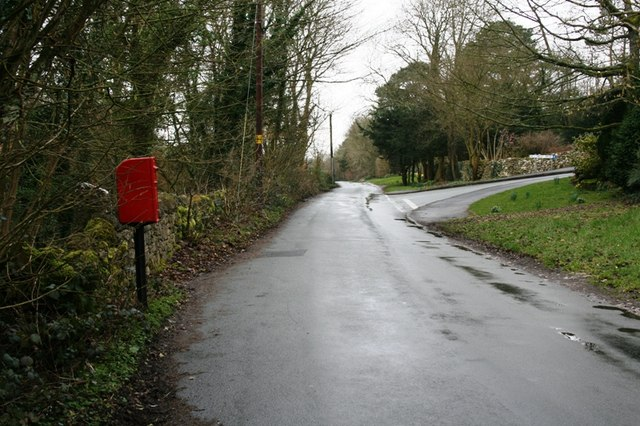
- Slackhead postbox, in 2007

- Location in South Lakeland Location within Cumbria
- OS grid reference: SD491787
- Civil parish: Beetham
- Unitary authority: Westmorland and Furness
- Ceremonial county: Cumbria
- Region: North West
- Country: England
- Sovereign state: United Kingdom
- Post town: MILNTHORPE
- Postcode district: LA7
- Dialling code: 015395
- Police: Cumbria
- Fire: Cumbria
- Ambulance: North West
- UK Parliament: Westmorland and Lonsdale

Slack Head, sometimes written Slackhead, is a hamlet near Beetham, Westmorland and Furness, Cumbria, England. It is in Beetham civil parish. It is a purely residential area, with a postbox as its only facility. It is the location of a small shrine to Saint Lioba (or Leoba) built into a wall. The Fairy Steps, a natural staircase in a limestone crag, lie in woodland to the northwest of the hamlet.

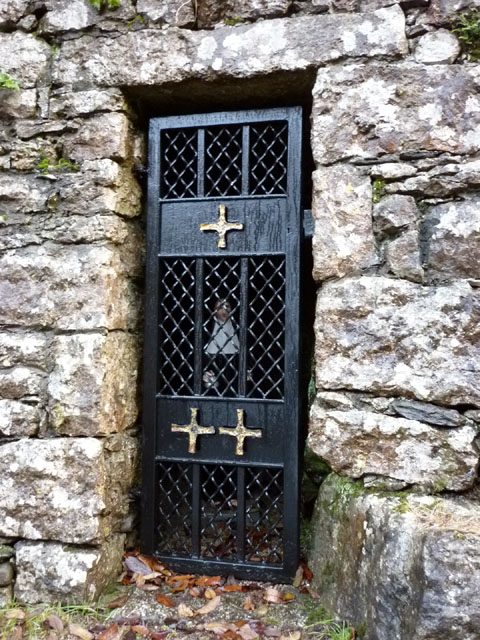
Shrine to St Lioba
