= Storth =

Village in Cumbria, England

Coordinates: 54.204°N 2.783°W

- Signpost at north end of Storth, on Kent estuary

- Location in South Lakeland Location within Cumbria
- OS grid reference: NY490790
- Civil parish: Beetham
- Unitary authority: Westmorland and Furness
- Ceremonial county: Cumbria
- Region: North West
- Country: England
- Sovereign state: United Kingdom
- Post town: MILNTHORPE
- Postcode district: LA7
- Dialling code: 015395 or 01524
- Police: Cumbria
- Fire: Cumbria
- Ambulance: North West
- UK Parliament: Westmorland and Lonsdale

Storth is a village near Arnside in Cumbria, England, situated near the border with Lancashire. It is in the historic county of Westmorland. The village faces the estuary of the River Kent. Although the village is ancient the vast bulk of the homes are from the latter part of the 20th century. There is a village church (Methodist and Anglican, in the Methodist building), and a primary school. The only commercial enterprise in the village is the post office and shop, a locally owned co-operative. Nearby Sandside has some commercial premises and a public house, The Ship Inn.

Storth is in the civil parish of Beetham in the Westmorland and Furness local government district.

The name Storth is an old Norse name for a woody place.

== See also ==
- Carr Bank
