= Beetham =

Village and civil parish in Cumbria, England

Coordinates: 54.208°N 2.775°W

- Early 20th century postcard of Beetham

- Location within Cumbria
- Population: 1,784 (2011)
- OS grid reference: SD4979
- Civil parish: Beetham
- Unitary authority: Westmorland and Furness
- Ceremonial county: Cumbria
- Region: North West
- Country: England
- Sovereign state: United Kingdom
- Post town: MILNTHORPE
- Postcode district: LA7
- Dialling code: 01539
- Police: Cumbria
- Fire: Cumbria
- Ambulance: North West
- UK Parliament: Westmorland and Lonsdale

Beetham is a village and civil parish in Westmorland and Furness, Cumbria, England. It is situated on the border with Lancashire, 6 miles (10 km) north of Carnforth. It is part of the Arnside and Silverdale Area of Outstanding Natural Beauty. In the 2001 census the parish had a population of 1,724, increasing at the 2011 census to 1,784.

== History ==
Craven in the Domesday Book of 1086 shows that until 1066, Earl Tostig was Lord of Beetham and the surrounding areas of Farleton, Preston Richard, Hincaster, Heversham and Levens in Cumbria, plus Yealand Redmayne and Borwick in Lancashire. Beetham Manor then amounted to 25 carucates (ca. 3000 acres/1250ha) of ploughland. The Norman Conquest of England added it to the extensive lands of Roger de Poitou.

== Demography ==
The parish had a population of 1,724 recorded in the 2001 census, increasing to 1,784 at the 2011 Census.

== Community ==
Points of interest include:

- The Church of St Michael and All Angels, parts of which date from the 12th century.
- The Heron Corn Mill, a working watermill and active arts and education center.
- The Heron Theatre, an 80-seat theatre housed in the listed 18th century grammar school .
- The Fairy Steps, a natural staircase in a limestone crag, in the woodland to the west of the village.
- A small shrine to Saint Lioba (or Leoba), built into a stone wall in the nearby hamlet of Slackhead.

== Geography ==
The River Bela flows past the village and through the deer park of Dallam Tower, skirting Milnthorpe before it washes out into the Kent Estuary near Sandside.

Half a mile to the south-east, Beetham Hall is a 14th-century fortified manor house, now largely ruined, adjoining later buildings. It is a grade II* listed building, with a separately II* listed curtain wall and a grade II barn, and is now occupied by a firm of funeral directors.

To the north of the village is the paper factory employing 140 people and producing 45,000 tonnes/year, specialising in kraft paper for pharmaceutical and food packaging. In 2021 it was acquired by Inspirit Capital from BillerudKorsnäs and renamed Pelta Medical Papers, the word Pelta deriving from the Greek word for a light-weight shield carried by a peltast. There has been a paper mill on the site since 1788, and in 1964 it was the UK's largest producer of kraft paper. Records at Companies House show the previous company names as J & J. Makin (1901–1990), (J.) Bibby Paper (1990–1997), Barlow Paper (1997–1999), Henry Cooke (1999–2004), and Billerud/BillerudKorsnäs (2004–2021.

== Civil parish ==
The civil parish of Beetham includes the main villages of Beetham and Storth and the smaller communities of Carr Bank, Sandside, Hale, Slackhead, Farleton and Whasset.

== Gallery ==
The main road into Beetham before the A6 road development

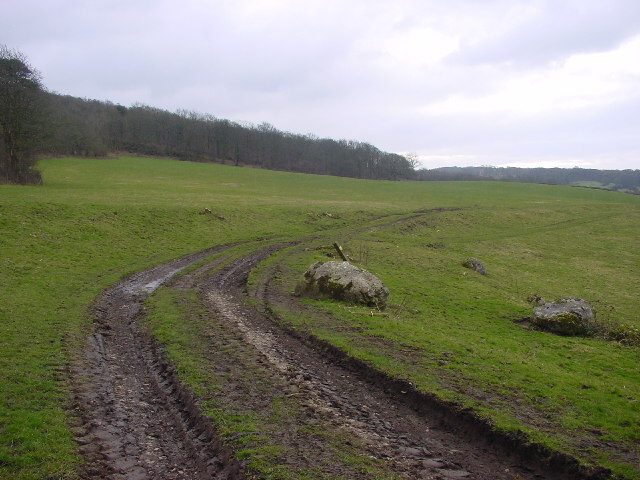
Footpath to Leighton Hall

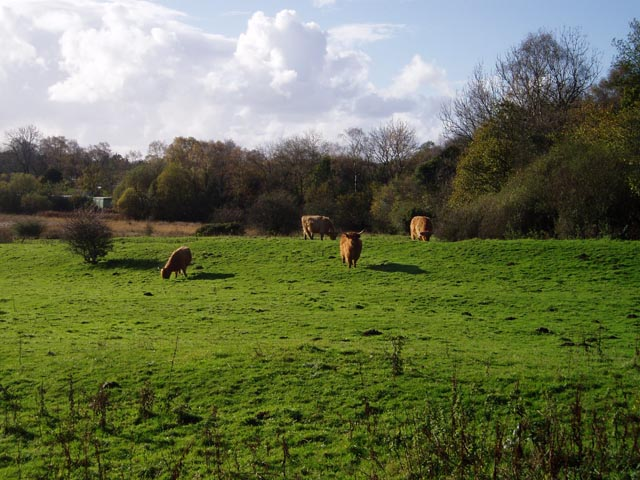
Highland cattle grazing

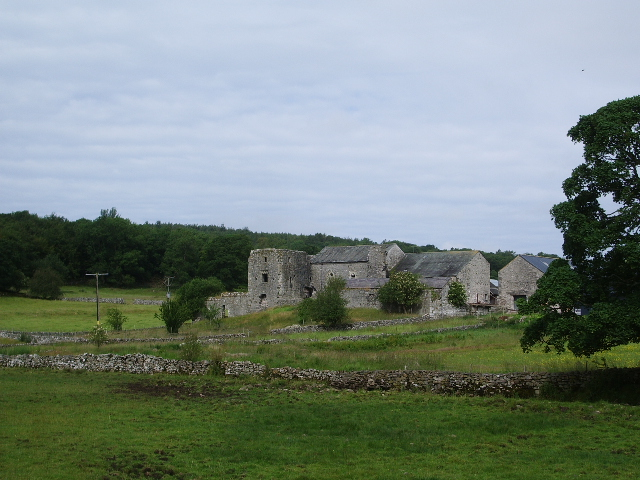
Beetham Hall in 2008

== See also ==
- Listed buildings in Beetham
