= Arnside railway station =

Railway station in Cumbria, England

Arnside
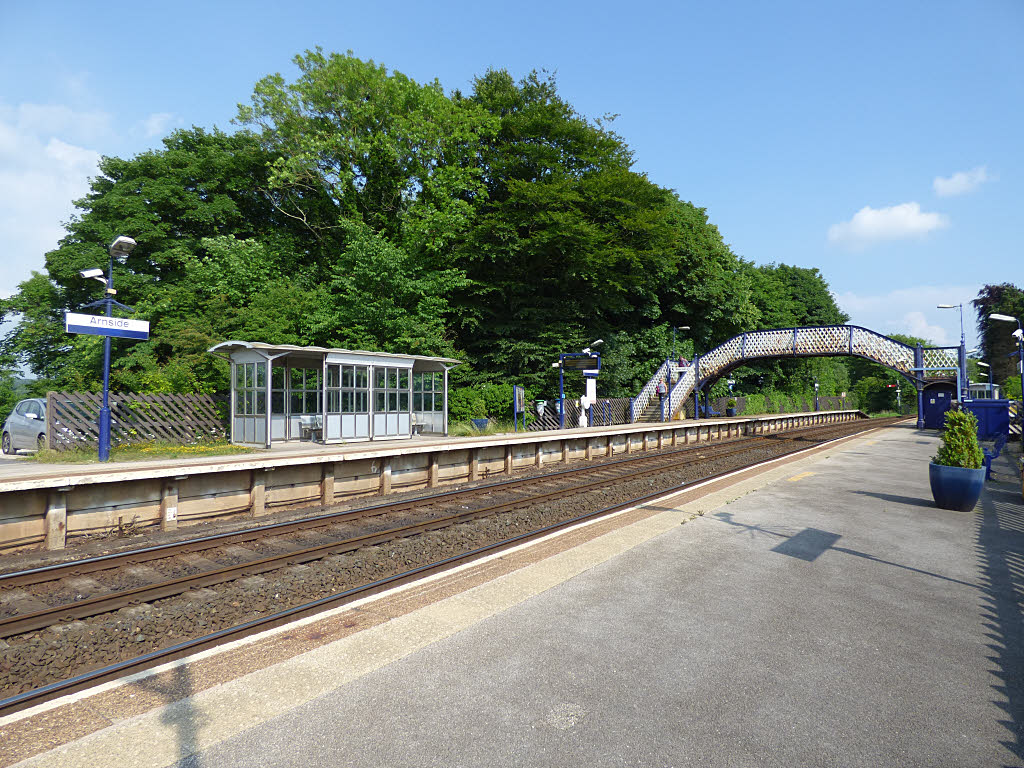

General information
- Location: Arnside, Westmorland and Furness; England
- Coordinates: 54°12′09″N 2°49′41″W
- Grid reference: SD461788
- Owner: Network Rail
- Manager: Northern Trains
- Platforms: 2
- Tracks: 2

Other information
- Station code: ARN
- Classification: DfT category F2

History
- Original company: Ulverstone and Lancaster Railway
- Pre-grouping: Furness Railway
- Post-grouping: London, Midland and Scottish Railway; British Rail (London Midland Region)

Key dates
- 1 August 1858: Opened

Passengers
- 2020/21: ▼28,764
- 2021/22: ▲0.100 million
- 2022/23: ▼91,330
- 2023/24: ▲0.106 million
- 2024/25: ▲0.120 million
Location
- Location within the former South Lakeland district Location within Cumbria
Notes
- Passenger statistics from the Office of Rail and Road

Arnside is a railway station on the Furness Line, which runs between Barrow-in-Furness and Lancaster. The station, situated 6 miles 21 chains (10.1 km) from Carnforth, serves the village of Arnside in Cumbria. It is owned by Network Rail and managed by Northern Trains, who operate services at the station.

== History ==
The station was opened in August 1858 by the Ulverstone and Lancaster Railway (a company later taken over by the Furness Railway).

A short branch line to Sandside and Hincaster Junction on the West Coast Main Line once diverged from the main line here, which carried a Grange-over-Sands to Kendal local service from its opening in 1876 until 1942. The branch was also used by mineral trains from County Durham to the Barrow-in-Furness area, allowing them to avoid having to reverse direction at the busy junction at Carnforth. Local freight traffic continued as far as Sandside until final closure of the line in 1972.

=== Arnside viaduct ===
A short distance west of the station, the railway crosses the River Kent on an impressive 50-span viaduct that is some 1,558-foot (475 m) long. The current structure was opened in 1915, replacing the earlier viaduct from 1857. The historic structure underwent major repairs and refurbishment, including the complete replacement of the rail deck in 2011. The viaduct only carries the railway, but there has been a longstanding campaign to widen it for road vehicles.

== Facilities ==
Whilst one building remains at the station, it is not in railway use. Shelters are provided for passengers on both platforms, but the only link between them is via a footbridge with stairs (no step-free access). Digital information screens, customer help points, timetable posters and automated announcements provide train running details. As the station is unstaffed, tickets can only be bought from the ticket machine or on the train.

== Passenger volume ==
Passenger volume at Arnside
	2004–05	2005–06	2006–07	2007–08	2008–09	2009–10	2010–11	2011–12	2012–13	2013–14	2014–15	2015–16	2016–17	2017–18	2018–19	2019–20	2020–21	2021–22	2022–23	2023–24	2024–25
Entries and exits	89,182	90,928	92,774	105,084	102,314	107,698	115,862	102,426	110,032	115,464	114,090	109,736	110,610	103,168	96,348	115,338	28,764	100,034	91,330	106,286	119,618

The statistics cover twelve month periods that start in April.

== Services ==
It is served by stopping trains between Lancaster and Barrow, with some continuing to Sellafield or Carlisle via the Cumbrian Coast Line in the northbound direction, and by some through services southbound to Preston and Manchester Airport. There is one train per hour in each direction on weekdays, although the varying nature of the stopping patterns of each service means the timetable is irregular. On Sundays there is a train every hour each way.

Preceding station	National Rail	Following station
Grange-over-Sands	Northern Trains; Cumbria–Manchester Airport	Carnforth
Grange-over-Sands	Northern Trains; Cumbria–Manchester Airport	Silverdale
Grange-over-Sands	Northern Trains; Furness Line	Silverdale
	Disused railways	
Grange-over-Sands	Furness Railway; Hincaster Branch	Sandside

== Community rail ==
The station, as with all others along the line, is part of Community Rail Cumbria, a Community rail scheme which supports the use and development of the line.

== Bibliography ==
- Butt, R. V. J. (October 1995). The Directory of Railway Stations: details every public and private passenger station, halt, platform and stopping place, past and present (1st ed.). Sparkford: Patrick Stephens Ltd. ISBN 978-1-85260-508-7. OCLC 60251199. OL 11956311M.
- Caton, Peter (2018). Remote Stations. Leicestershire: Matador. ISBN 978-1-78901-408-2.
- Jowett, Alan (2000). Jowett's Nationalised Railway Atlas (1st ed.). Penryn, Cornwall: Atlantic Transport Publishers. ISBN 978-0-906899-99-1. OCLC 228266687.
- Quick, Michael (2023). Railway Passenger Stations in Great Britain: A Chronology (PDF) (5th ed.). London: Railway and Canal Historical Society.
