= River Bela =

River in Cumbria, England

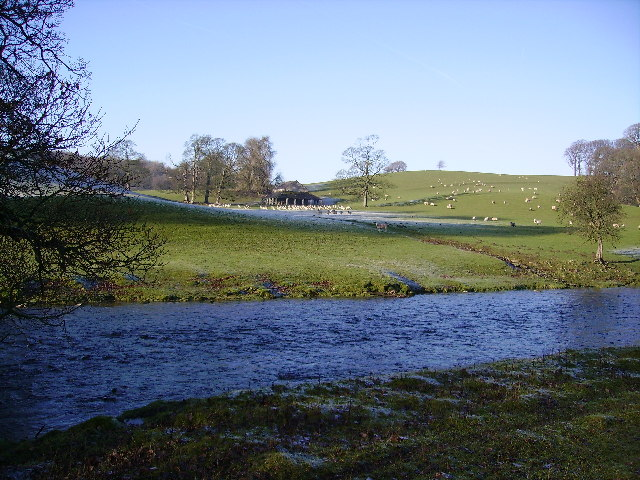
- The Bela between Beetham and Milnthorpe

- Location within Cumbria

Location
- Country: United Kingdom
- Part: England
- County: Cumbria

Physical characteristics
- Source confluence
  - location: confluence of Peasey Beck and Stainton Beck at Overthwaite
- Mouth: Confluence with River Kent
  - coordinates: 54.22707°N 2.78725°W

The River Bela is a short (approximately 4 miles (6.5 km)) river in the county of Cumbria, England. It is in the ancient county of Westmorland.

The river is formed by the confluence of Peasey Beck and Stainton Beck at Overthwaite. It runs through Beetham where it powers the Heron Corn Mill, and then flows through the deer park of Dallam Tower before skirting around the south of the village of Milnthorpe and joining the River Kent estuary between Sandside and Milnthorpe.

At its mouth it was formerly crossed by the Bela Viaduct on the Hincaster Branch Line railway from Arnside to Hincaster, demolished after the line was closed to passengers in 1942 and the track lifted in 1966.

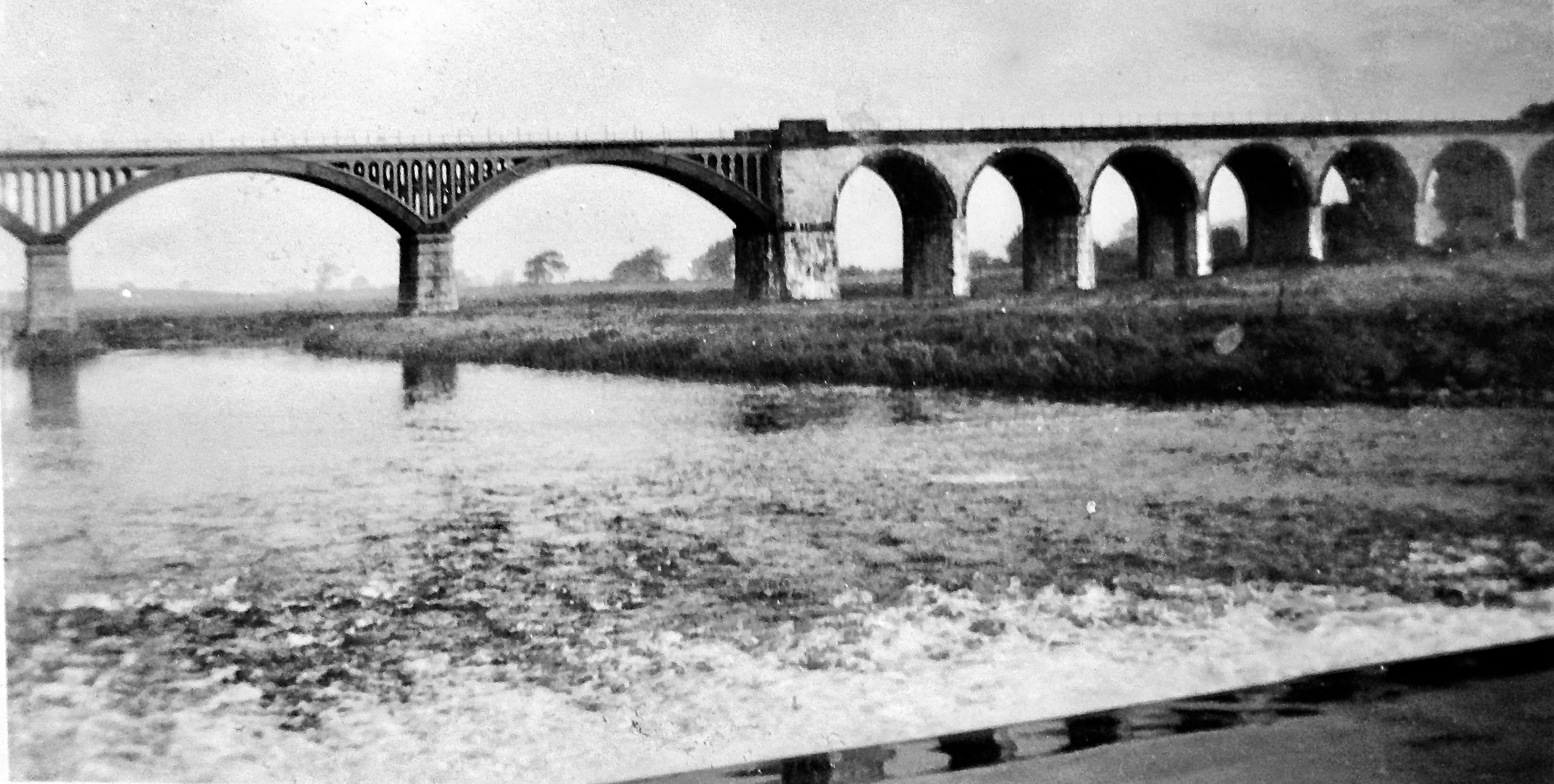
The Bela viaduct in about 1930, looking west

During World War II a prisoner of war camp was built beside the river near Whasset. After the war the camp became an open prison, and there is now a residential school on the site.

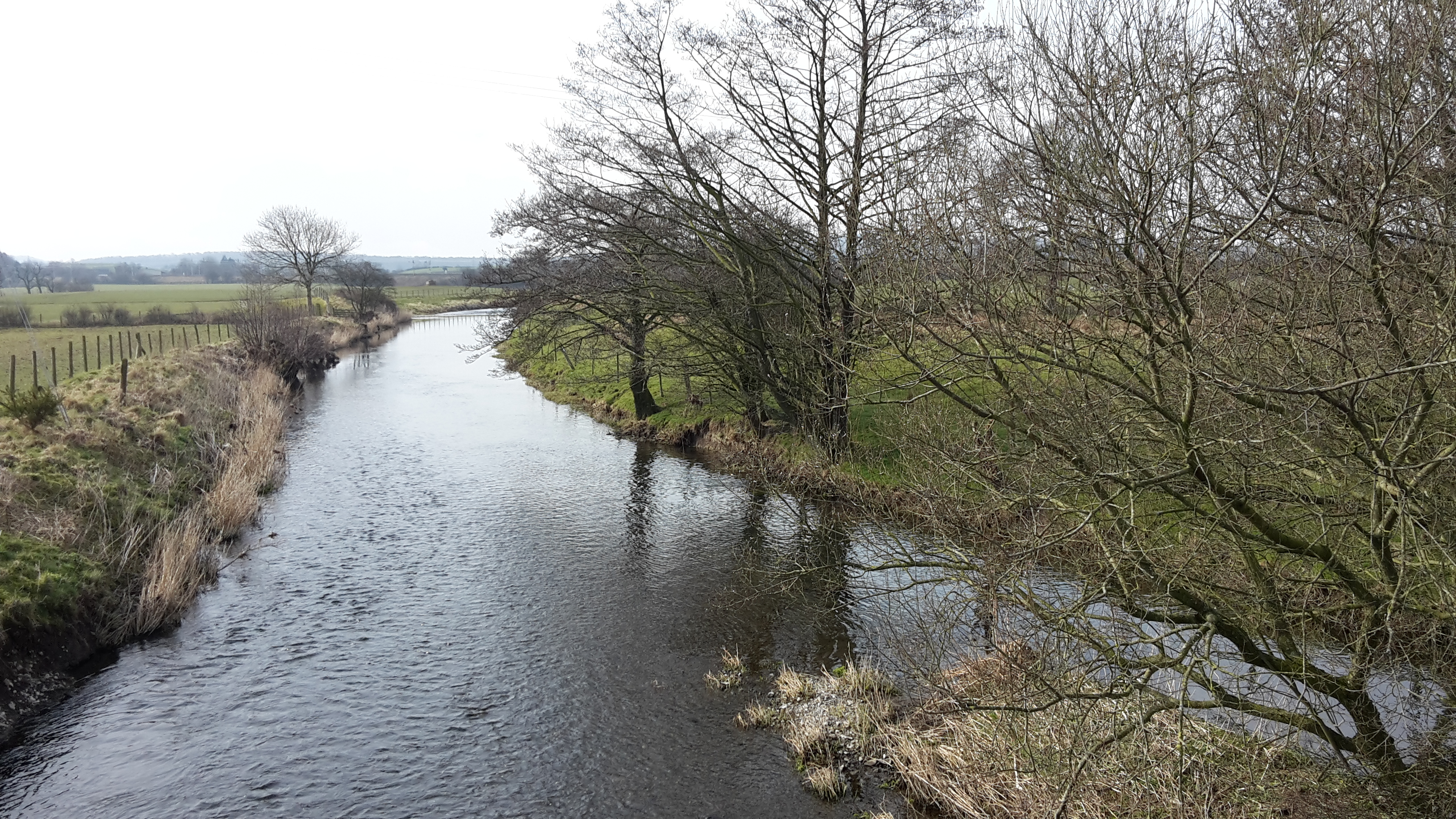
Head of River Bela at Overthwaite at the confluence of Peasey Beck [bottom left] and Stainton Beck [bottom right]

== Hydro power ==
The river has been used for power since at least 1096 when there was a watermill at or near the present Heron Corn Mill. It is now used both to power the corn mill and to generate electricity using a Kaplan turbine.
