= Carr Bank =

Hamlet in Cumbria, England

Coordinates: 54.203°N 2.809°W

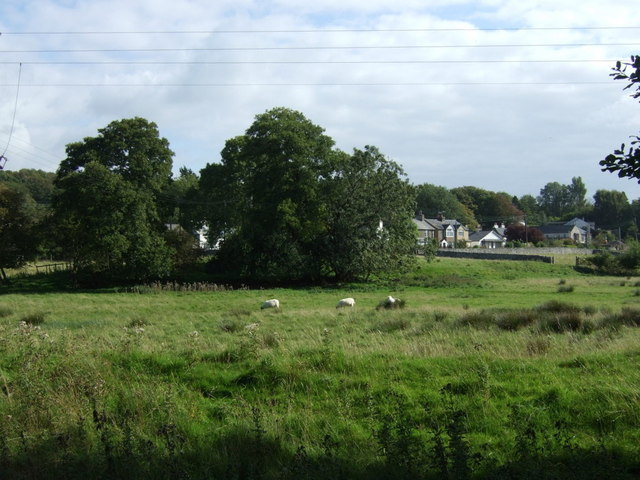
- Grazing off Sandside Road, Carr Bank

- Location in South Lakeland Location within Cumbria
- OS grid reference: SD472789
- Civil parish: Beetham
- Unitary authority: Westmorland and Furness
- Ceremonial county: Cumbria
- Region: North West
- Country: England
- Sovereign state: United Kingdom
- Post town: MILNTHORPE
- Postcode district: LA7
- Dialling code: 01524
- Police: Cumbria
- Fire: Cumbria
- Ambulance: North West
- UK Parliament: Westmorland and Lonsdale

Carr Bank is a small hamlet near Arnside, Cumbria, England. It is in the civil parish of Beetham in the Westmorland and Furness local government district.
