= Hincaster branch line =

Closed railway line in Cumbria, England

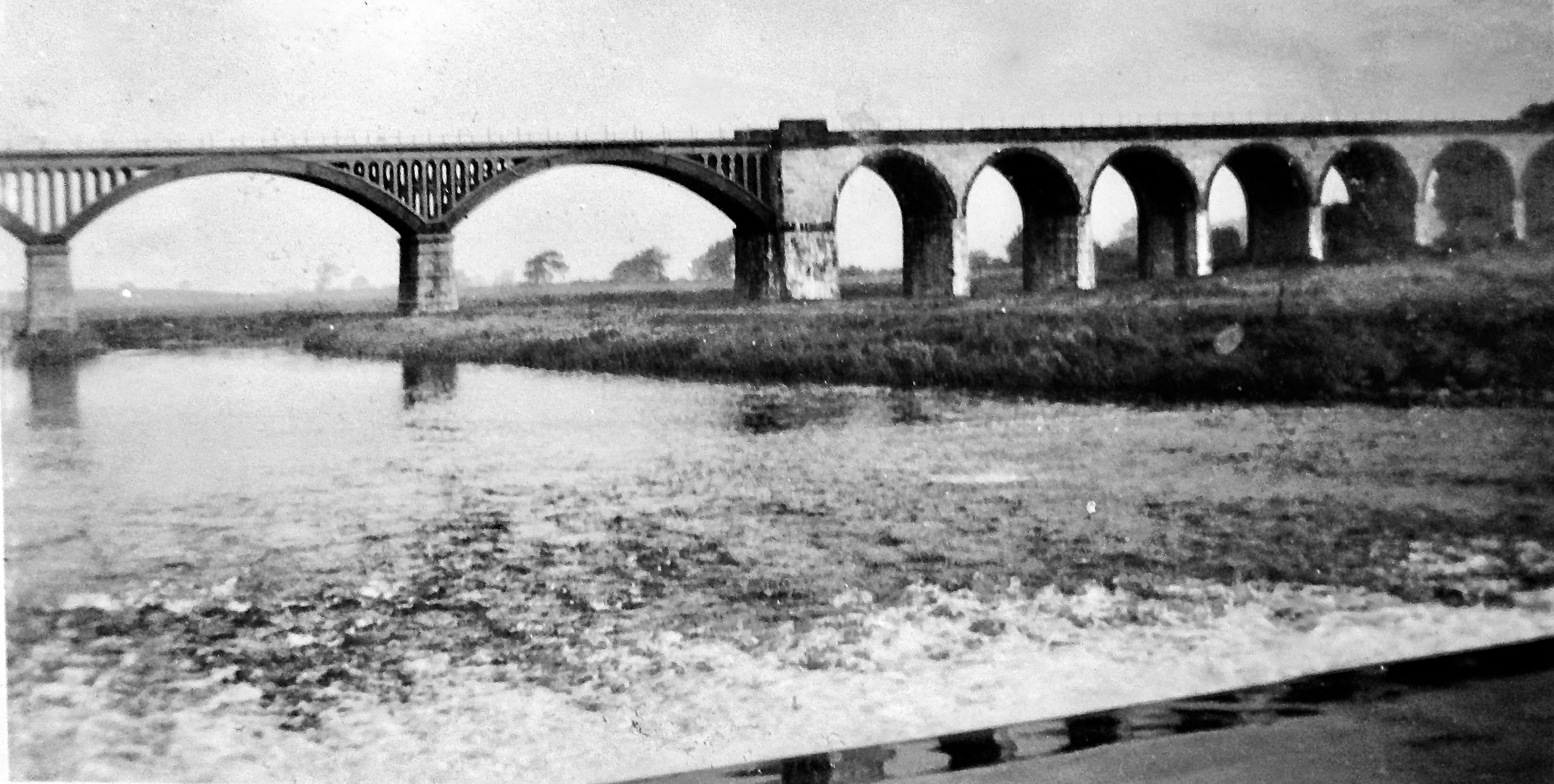
- Bela Viaduct about 1930

Overview
- Locale: Cumbria, England

History
- Opened: 1876
- Closed: 1966

Technical
- Track gauge: 4 ft 8 1/2 in (1,435 mm) standard gauge

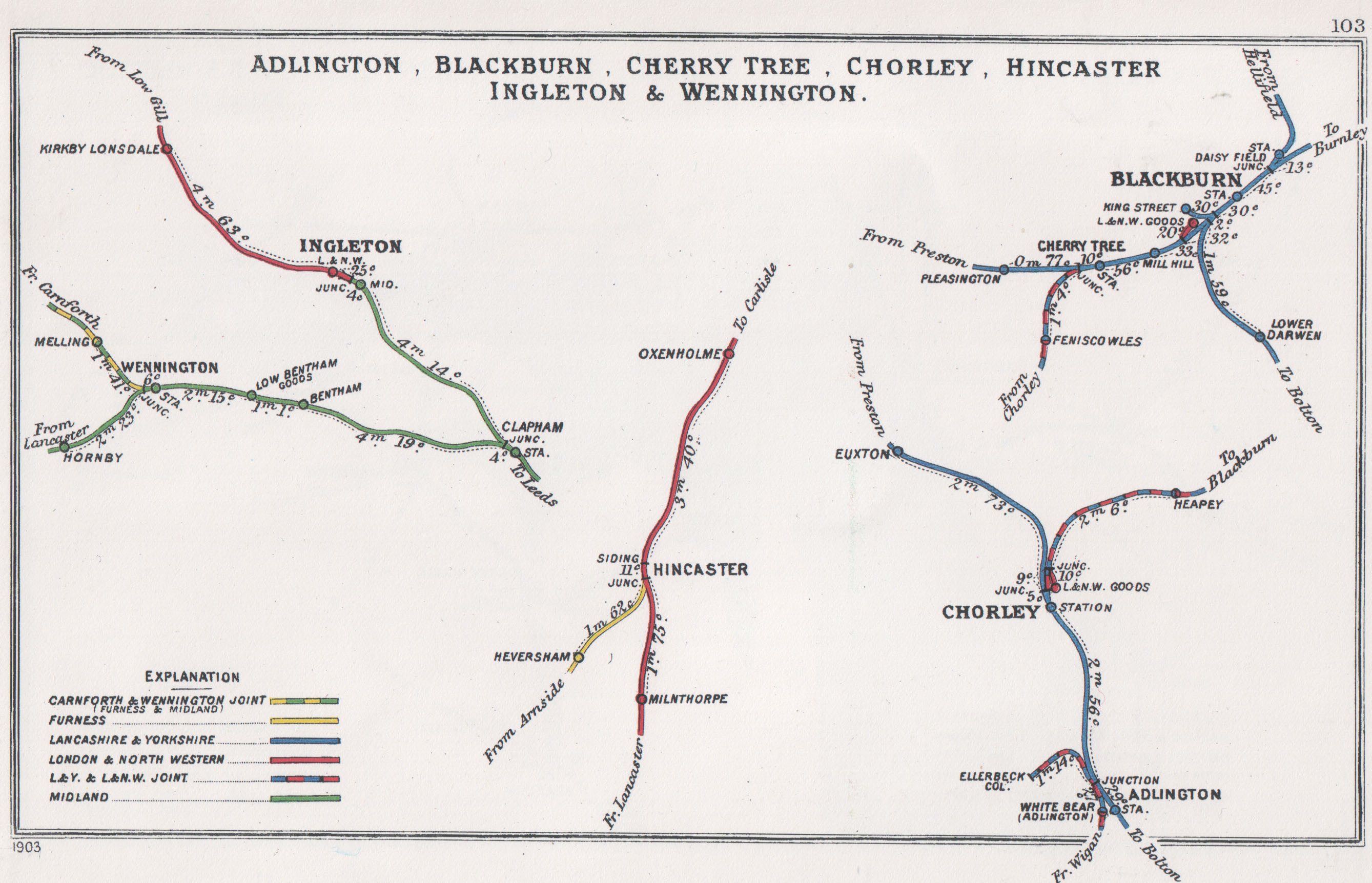
Junction at Hincaster

The Hincaster branch was a single-track railway branch line of the Furness Railway which ran from Arnside on the Furness main line to a junction with the Lancaster and Carlisle Railway (later the London and North Western Railway) at Hincaster. Intermediate stations were provided at Sandside and Heversham, with the main engineering work being a substantial 26-arch viaduct over the River Bela near Sandside.

== Traffic ==
The 5.25-mile (8.45 km) line was built primarily for use by mineral trains carrying coke and iron ore from County Durham to various ironworks in and around Barrow-in-Furness which had previously had to travel (and reverse) via the busy junction at Carnforth. The branch was opened to goods traffic on 3 June 1876 and also carried a passenger service between Grange-over-Sands and Kendal known locally as the Kendal Tommy. Both the Furness Railway, and the Midland Railway, considered building a line from Hincaster Junction to Garsdale (Hawes Junction) on the Settle–Carlisle line to connect with the Wensleydale Railway, in an effort to shorten the route for coke trains, and to prevent the traffic having to use the main line section between Tebay and Oxenholme. It was noted that this line would a challenge as "considerable tunnelling" would be required.

Due to the railway rising from Sandside where it was at sea level to 200 feet (61 m) in under 2 miles (3.2 km) (a constant gradient of 1-in-50), the coke traffic still travelled for reversals at Carnforth. Heavier traffic at Carnforth during the First World War prompted the railway company to employ adequate motive power for the trains to use the Hincaster branch.

== Closure ==
The passenger service ended on 4 May 1942 and the track between Sandside and Hincaster Junction was lifted in 1966 (through traffic having ceased three years earlier). A short stub from Arnside to Sandside lasted until 1972 to serve local quarries.

Sections of the old trackbed survive and are used as a footpath and cycleway, though the viaduct and both intermediate stations have been demolished.

== Notes ==
Preceded by London and North Western Railway	Lancaster and Carlisle Railway	Succeeded by London, Midland and Scottish Railway
