= Ashton House, Dublin =

Stately home in Dublin, Ireland

Ashton House
- Location within Dublin

General information
- Status: Private dwelling house
- Type: House
- Architectural style: Victorian, Italianate, Palladian
- Location: Ashtown, Dublin, Ashtown, County Dublin, Ireland
- Coordinates: 53.3765°N 6.3385°W
- Completed: 1880s
- Cost: €6.65m (2018)
- Owner: Joe O'Reilly (Chartered Land)

Technical details
- Material: Nap render finish
- Floor count: 3
- Floor area: 600sq m (6,458sq ft)

Design and construction
- Architect: William Hague (1891 remodelling)

Ashton House is a period house and estate in Ashtown, Dublin, Ireland. It is on the Fingal County Council Register of Protected Structures, code 0690.

== History ==
In 2006, the estate was sold for €26 million. In 2015, it was listed for sale at €2.8 million and eventually sold for €6.65 million in 2018. Previous owners include the Moore, Alexander, Neyland, and Stone families.

== Architecture ==
Located by the 10th lock of the Royal Canal, Ashton House sits on approximately 28 acres of land and is adjacent to Ashtown railway station. It is bounded by the canal to the south, Coolmine RFC to the west, the River Road and River Tolka to the north, and Rathborne Village to the east. Built around 1830, the house was designed in the Victorian Italianate style. On either side of the central three-bay, three-storey building lie two-storey wings, with a basement beneath. The double-pitched slate roof is surrounded by a parapet. The walls feature Italianate balustrades and decorative urns. Other features include Doric and Corinthian pilasters, stained glass windows, and sash windows. The house extends over 6,458 square feet, including 12 bedrooms and a ballroom. The estate also includes a 1-acre walled garden, greenhouses, outbuildings, a four-bed lodge, a four-bed gate bungalow, and gates opening onto the village.
