= Grange-over-Sands railway station =

Railway station in Cumbria, England

Grange-over-Sands
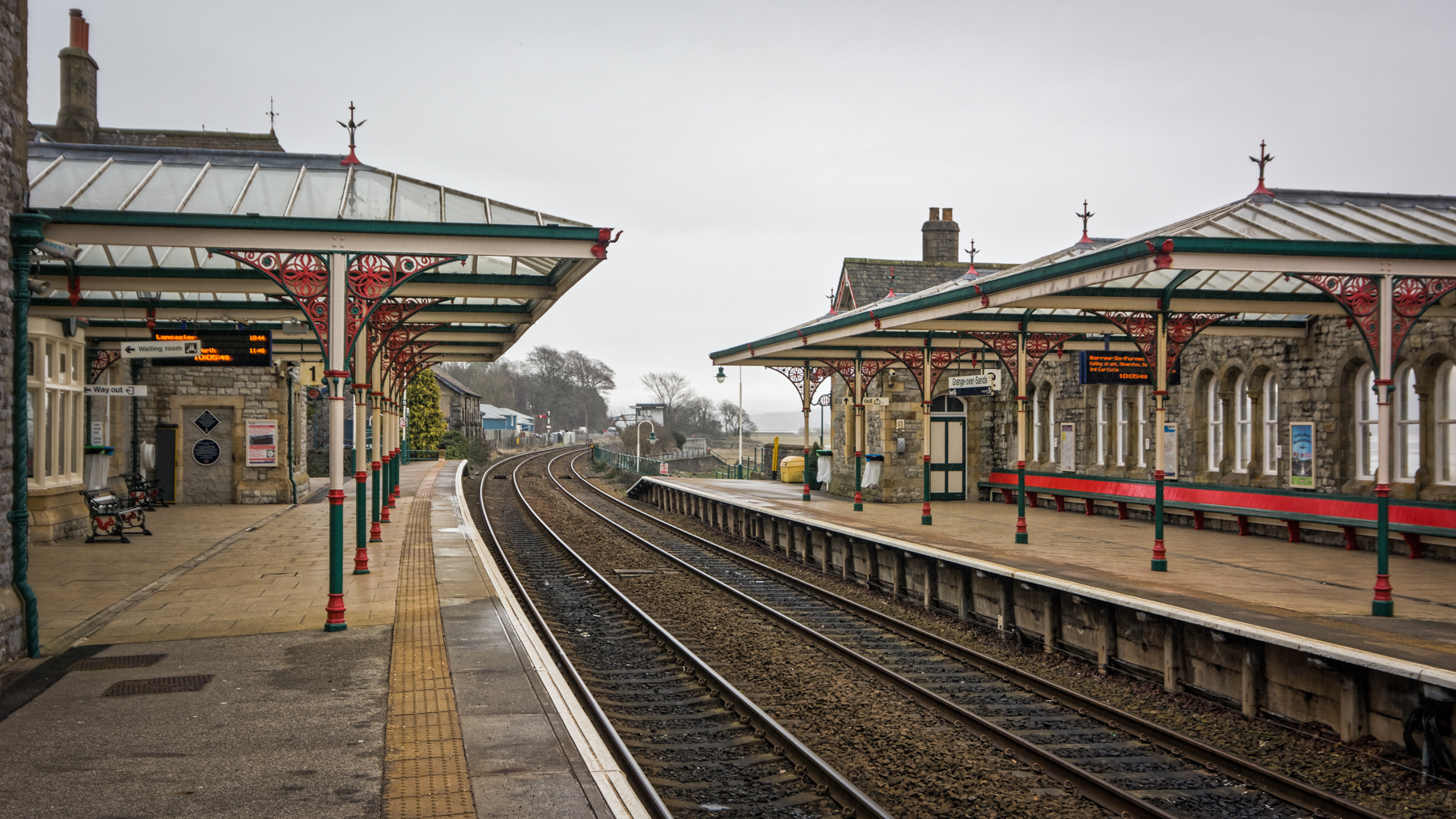

General information
- Location: Grange-over-Sands, Westmorland and Furness; England
- Coordinates: 54°11′45″N 2°54′09″W
- Grid reference: SD411781
- Owner: Network Rail
- Manager: Northern Trains
- Platforms: 2
- Tracks: 2

Other information
- Station code: GOS
- Classification: DfT category E

History
- Original company: Ulverstone and Lancaster Railway
- Pre-grouping: Furness Railway
- Post-grouping: London, Midland and Scottish Railway; British Rail (London Midland Region)

Key dates
- 1 September 1857: Opened as Grange
- 1 June 1916: Renamed Grange-over-Sands
- 2 April 1923: Renamed Grange
- 1 October 1930: Renamed Grange-over-Sands

Passengers
- 2020/21: ▼41,274
- 2021/22: ▲0.132 million
- 2022/23: ▼0.128 million
- 2023/24: ▲0.141 million
- 2024/25: ▲0.155 million

Listed Building – Grade II
- Feature: Original Furness Railway station building
- Designated: 2 May 1975
- Reference no.: 1269659
Location
- Location within the former South Lakeland district Location within Cumbria
Notes
- Passenger statistics from the Office of Rail and Road

Grange-over-Sands is a railway station on the Furness Line, which runs between Barrow-in-Furness and Lancaster. The station, situated 15 1/2 miles (25 km) north-west of Lancaster, serves the town of Grange-over-Sands in Cumbria. It is owned by Network Rail and managed by Northern Trains.

== History ==
The station was opened as Grange on 1 September 1857 by the Ulverstone and Lancaster Railway.

The station was renamed several times, alternating between Grange and Grange-over-Sands, the current name being settled on by the London Midland and Scottish Railway in October 1930.

The station building was designed by the Lancaster architect E. G. Paley for the Furness Railway Company in about 1864.

Two camping coaches were positioned here by the London Midland Region from 1954 to 1964, and four coaches from 1965 to 1970.

At one time the line carried a very heavy industrial traffic to support the iron and steel industry of the Furness area, including coke from County Durham.

== Location ==
The station is adjacent to the Grange-over-Sands Promenade which runs along the edge of Morecambe Bay (until the River Kent changed its course, it was alongside the promenade - it is now further out in the bay towards Arnside).

Preceding station	National Rail	Following station
Kents Bank	Northern Trains; Furness Line	Arnside

== Facilities ==
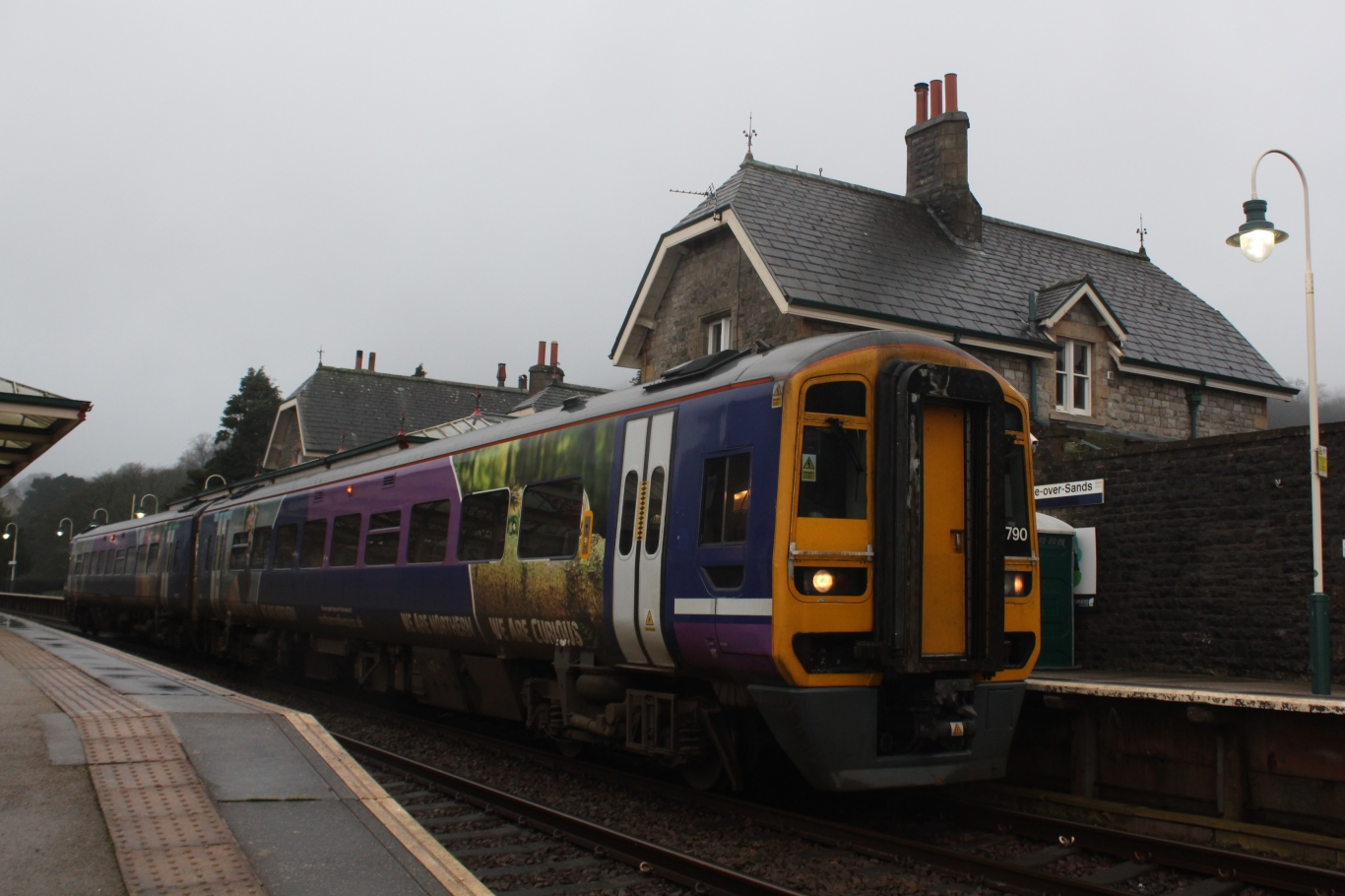
A Northern Class 158 calls with a service to Preston

The station booking office is on the "up" (Lancaster) platform and is staffed all week; the "down" (Barrow-in-Furness) platform features a second-hand book-shop named Oversands Bookshop. There is step-free access to both platforms. Digital information screens, customer help points and automatic announcements provide train running information.

There is a small car park at the station, and a bus-stop for local services. The X6 bus operated by Stagecoach also travels to Ulverston and Barrow (westbound) and Kendal (eastbound), departing every hour during the day.

The station was awarded 'Heritage Station of the Year' in 2012.

== Services ==
It is primarily served by local services from Lancaster to Barrow-in-Furness, with some continuing to Sellafield or Carlisle via the Cumbrian Coast Line. A number of southbound services run through to Preston and Manchester Airport. There is normally one train an hour in each direction on weekdays & Saturdays (with peak extras) and an hourly service on Sundays. Since the May 2018 timetable change, there is a Sunday service on the Cumbrian Coast and a handful of through trains operate (three each way - connections are available at Barrow at other times).

== See also ==
- List of non-ecclesiastical works by E. G. Paley
