= Sandside railway station =

Disused railway station in Cumbria, England

Coordinates: 54.2220°N 2.7976°W

General information
- Location: Cumbria, England; England

Other information
- Status: Disused

History
- Original company: Furness Railway
- Pre-grouping: London and North Western Railway
- Post-grouping: London, Midland and Scottish Railway

Key dates
- 26 June 1876 (the line itself opened on the 3rd of the month): Opened as Sandside
- 4 May 1942: Closed
Location

Sandside was a railway station situated on the Hincaster Branch of the Furness Railway serving the hamlet and quarries of Sandside. The following station was Heversham, which was the last on the branch before the line joined what is now known as the West Coast Main Line at Hincaster Junction, south of Oxenholme.

A Furness Railway local passenger train service (known locally as the Kendal Tommy for much of its life) operated through Sandside from Grange-over-Sands to Kendal between 1876 and its withdrawal in May 1942, when the station also closed to passengers. In July 1922, this FR service ran five times per day in each direction on weekdays. Through goods traffic ended in 1963 and the track was lifted north of here three years later, although the remaining stub down to Arnside was retained until final closure in 1972 to serve local quarries.

== Services ==
Preceding station	Disused railways	Following station
Arnside; Line closed, station open	Furness Railway; Hincaster Branch	Heversham; Line and station closed
