= Heversham =

Village and civil parish in Cumbria, England

Coordinates: 54.244°N 2.774°W

- Village and parish
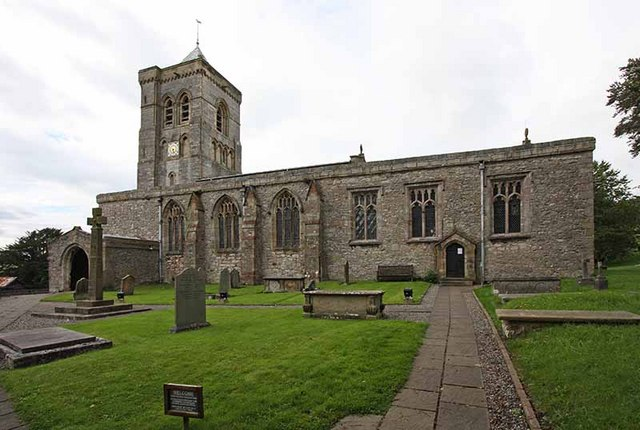
- St Peter's Church

- Location in the former South Lakeland district Location within Cumbria
- Population: 699 (2011)
- OS grid reference: SD4983
- Civil parish: Heversham
- Unitary authority: Westmorland and Furness
- Ceremonial county: Cumbria
- Region: North West
- Country: England
- Sovereign state: United Kingdom
- Post town: MILNTHORPE
- Postcode district: LA7
- Dialling code: 01539
- Police: Cumbria
- Fire: Cumbria
- Ambulance: North West
- UK Parliament: Westmorland and Lonsdale

Heversham is a village and civil parish in the Westmorland and Furness unitary authority area of Cumbria, England. In the 2001 census the parish had a population of 647, increasing at the 2011 census to 699.

It is situated above the marshes of the Kent estuary which gives some fine views, notably from Heversham Head where there is a toposcope.

It has a variety of recreational facilities, including a fully functioning outdoor activities centre, tennis courts, bowling green and a playground. There are also rugby, football and hockey fields, as well as a cricket ground and pavilion.

== History ==
Heversham had an abbey in the early Anglo-Saxon period. According to the Historia de Sancto Cuthberto, in the early tenth century its abbot, who was called Tilred, purchased the village of Castle Eden and gave half of it to Norham abbey so that he could be abbot there, perhaps because Heversham Abbey had been destroyed by the Vikings. Part of a carved stone cross still survives. It was found under the lych-gate of St Peter's Church, which may indicate that the monastery was located nearby.

== Transport ==
=== Rail ===
It was on the Hincaster branch railway line from 26 June 1876. Passenger services ended on the branch on 4 May 1942.

=== Road ===
Heversham is situated just off the A6. It formerly straddled the A6, but the centre of the village was bypassed in the 1920s. However, the Stagecoach bus route 555 still passes through the centre.

The new section of road was opened by the future Edward VIII and was named Prince's Way. The Heversham Hotel, referred to by the locals as the "Blue Bell", is on this bypass.

== Schools ==
Heversham Grammar School existed for more than 370 years from 1613 until 1984, when it amalgamated with the comprehensive school in Milnthorpe to become the boarding house and 6th form college of Dallam School. The boarding and outdoors section of Dallam School are situated in Heversham and the outdoors centre is open to the public.

The local primary school, Heversham St Peters, was closed in 2017. It used to be next to the church but was moved to Leasgill due to the fact that the toilets were right above the village water supply.

== Famous people ==
- Geoffrey Bibby, archaeologist

== See also ==
- Listed buildings in Heversham
