= Milnthorpe =

Village and civil parish in Cumbria, England

Coordinates: 54.227°N 2.773°W

- Village and parish
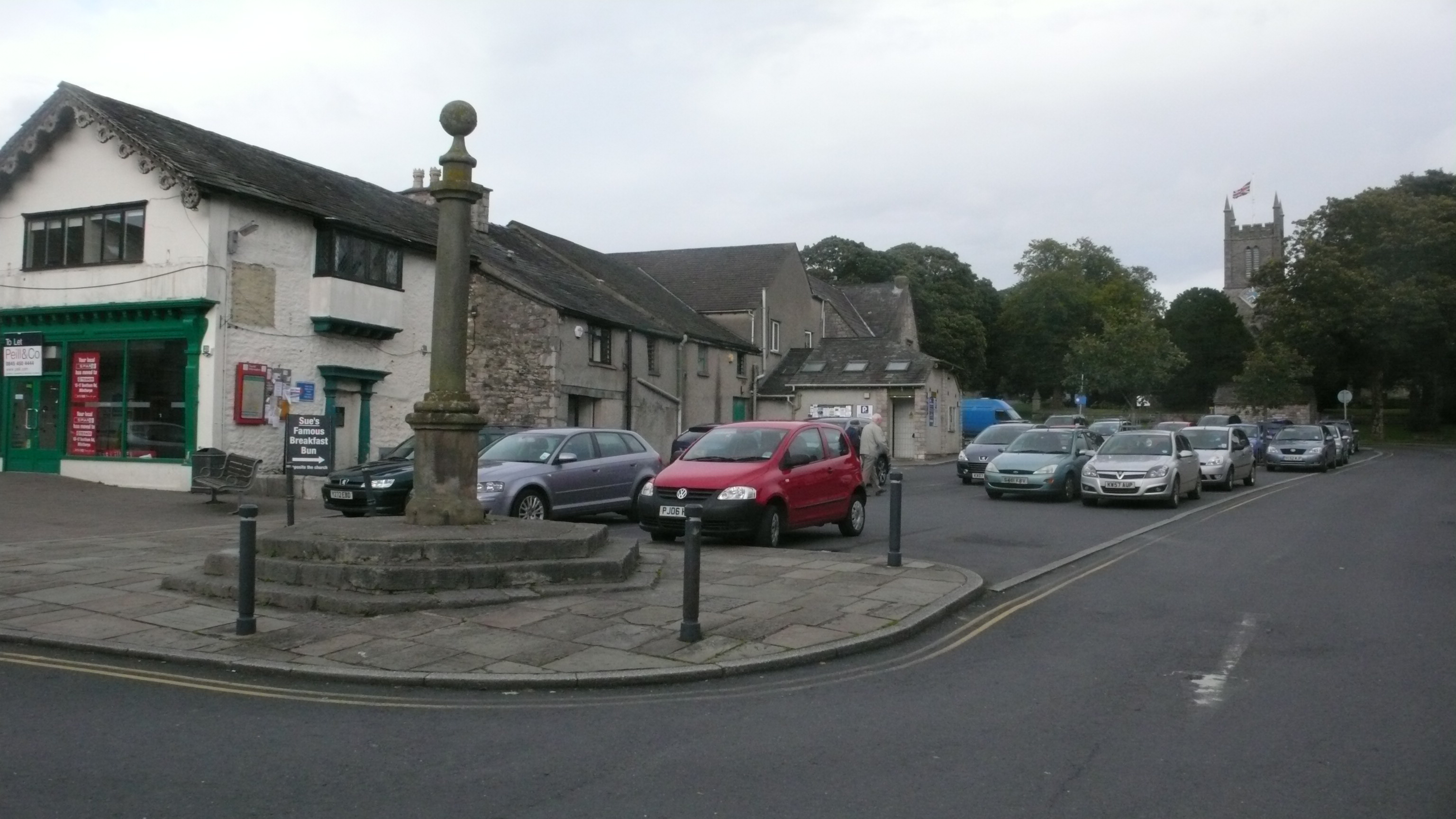
- Market cross and market square with St Thomas's church behind

- Location in the former South Lakeland district Location within Cumbria
- Population: 2,199 (2011 Census)
- OS grid reference: SD496815
- Civil parish: Milnthorpe
- Unitary authority: Westmorland and Furness
- Ceremonial county: Cumbria
- Region: North West
- Country: England
- Sovereign state: United Kingdom
- Post town: MILNTHORPE
- Postcode district: LA7
- Dialling code: 015395
- Police: Cumbria
- Fire: Cumbria
- Ambulance: North West
- UK Parliament: Morecambe and Lunesdale

Milnthorpe is a village, civil parish, and former market town in Westmorland and Furness, Cumbria, England. It is 7 miles (11 km) south of Kendal. Historically in the county of Westmorland and on the A6, the village contains several old hostelries and hosts a market every Friday. The parish, which includes the village of Ackenthwaite, had a population of 2,199 according to the 2011 Census.

== History ==
Milnthorpe was granted a market charter in 1334, although this lapsed in the 1920s.

Milnthorpe was part of the township of Heversham-with Milnthorpe, and was in Heversham parish until 1896. The 19th-century Church of St Thomas, which overlooks The Green and The Square, was designed by Kendal architect George Webster.

Milnthorpe became a centre of business and activity because it was originally a port, using the River Bela and estuary (now only navigable to Arnside) and it remains a significant commercial centre for the area.

== Economy ==
Tourism is a major contributor to the local economy. Milnthorpe had coaching inns on the main road north, the modern A6. The village used to be a major traffic bottleneck before the opening of the M6 motorway in 1970, and the A590/A591 Kendal link road a few years later. The congestion at Milnthorpe' cross roads was notoriously amongst the worst in the North West. The village is just outside the Arnside and Silverdale National Landscape (formerly AONB), with the River Bela forming its northern boundary.

The popular children's drink Um Bongo was made in Milnthorpe by Libby's in the 1980s. Nestlé plant sauces and fruit juice were made by Libby, which opened in 1935. The site made Libby's Creamed Rice and evaporated milk, until production was moved to southern Derbyshire in 1985. The Nestlé plant closed around early 1995, and made Crosse & Blackwell salad dressing, and tomato ketchup.

Milnthorpe is the home of Duralon Combs, a comb manufacturing business over 300 years old. Big Fish Internet Ltd (formerly BF Internet, now trading as BFI) was founded in Milnthorpe in 1996 and is now located 2 miles (3.2 km) away in Sandside; it is the longest-established web design company in the UK. The village has a branch of the family-owned supermarket Booths.

Milnthorpe market was revived in the 1980s and for some years contributed substantially to the parish council's income through stall rentals. In the 21st century the market has reduced in size, reducing the council's income, but it is still held weekly, with a monthly farmers' market.

== Governance ==
Milnthorpe is in the unitary authority area of Westmorland and Furness, in the ceremonial county of Cumbria. It is in the parliamentary constituency of Westmorland and Lonsdale, held since 2005 by Liberal Democrat Tim Farron.

Milnthorpe has a parish council.

From 1 April 1974 to 1 April 2023, Milnthorpe was in South Lakeland non-metropolitan district.

== Community ==
Milnthorpe has one secondary school, Dallam School, which was graded "Needs improvement" by Ofsted in 2023 and one primary school, Milnthorpe Primary School, rated by Ofsted as "Good" in 2019.

There are three public houses in the village.

== Landmarks ==
The Grade I listed house Dallam Tower, with an estate known for its deer, stands near to the River Bela just south-west of Milnthorpe, although in the parish of Beetham. The grade II listed St Anthony's Tower may be seen on the top of St Anthony's Hill to the north-east of the village centre. There are a total of nine grade II listed buildings or structures in the parish, including a footbridge over the River Bela, built in 1730 as a road bridge.

Just to the north is Levens Hall, famed for its topiary.

== People ==
The former Leader of the Liberal Democrats (2015–2017), Tim Farron (MP for Westmorland and Lonsdale) lives in Milnthorpe.

John Taylor, third president of the Church of Jesus Christ of Latter-day Saints from 1880 to 1887, was born in Milnthorpe and lived there until he emigrated to Canada.

== Transport ==
As of March 2026, two bus routes serve the town, both are run by Stagecoach. The first is the 555 to Lancaster via Carnforth or to Keswick via Central Lakes. The second is the 755 to Heysham via Carnforth & Morecambe or to Bowness-on-Windermere via Kendal and Windermere.

Since the closure of Milnthorpe railway station in 1968, the nearest train services are at Carnforth 3 miles away (on the Furness line and the Leeds–Morecambe line) and at Oxenholme, 7.5 miles away, on the West Coast Main Line.

== Gallery ==
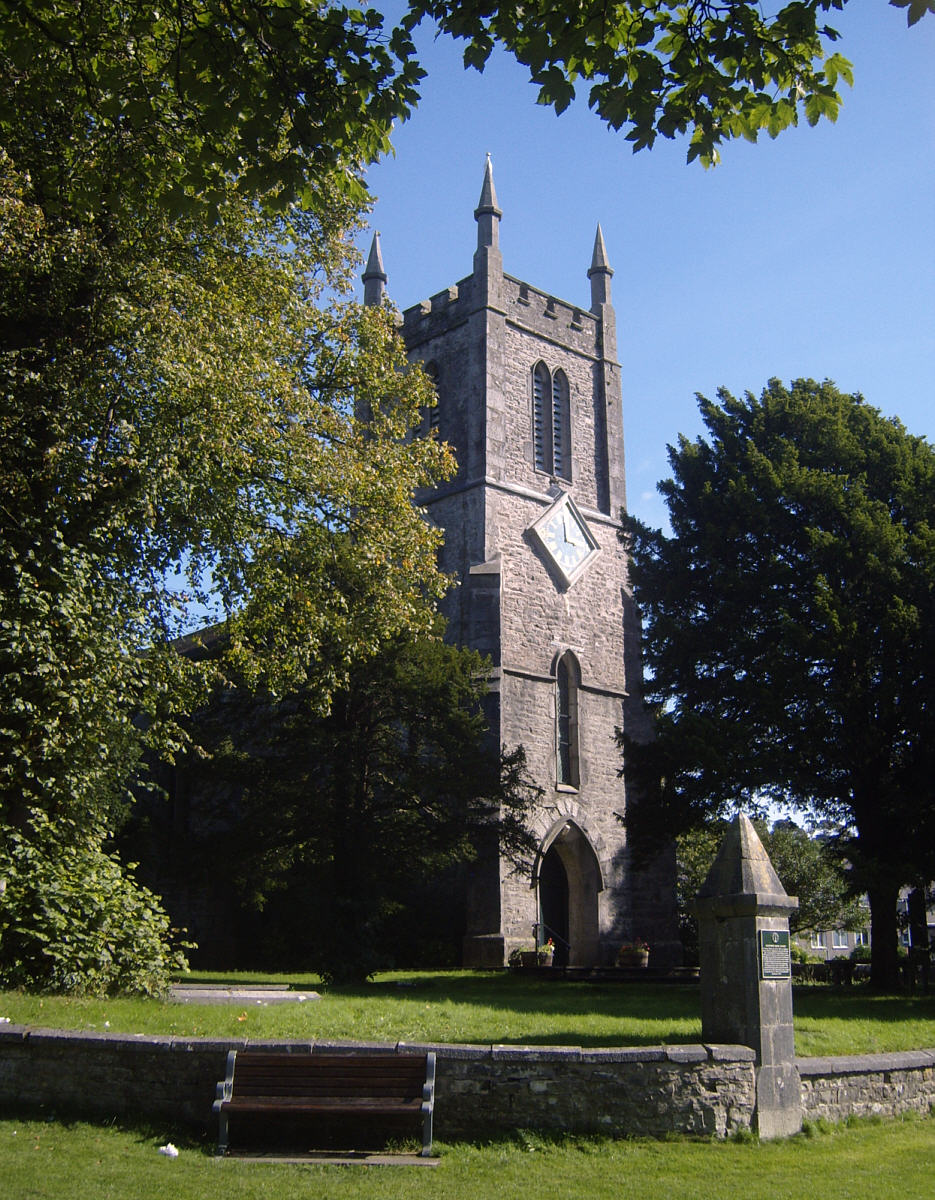
Milnthorpe Parish Church

Cross Keys Hotel

Bend in the River Bela

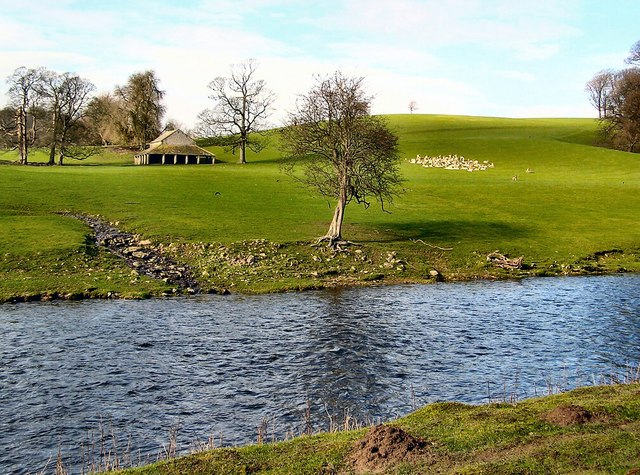
Deer shelter in Dallam Tower park

== See also ==
- Listed buildings in Milnthorpe
