= Walton Summit =

Industrial estate in Lancashire, England

Coordinates: 53.7234°N 2.6429°W

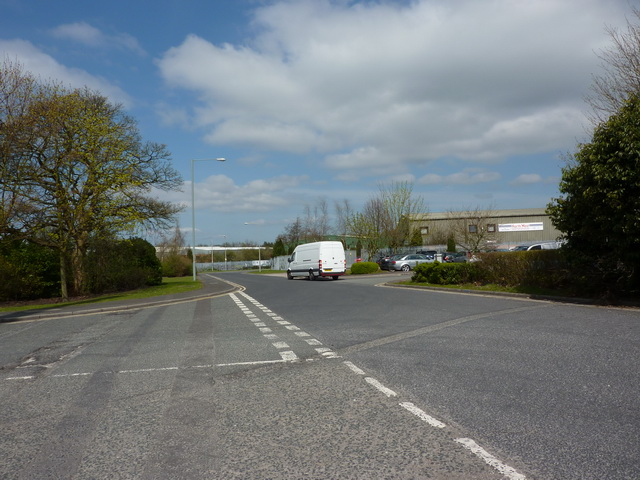

- Shown within South Ribble Location within Lancashire
- District: South Ribble
- Shire county: Lancashire
- Region: North West
- Country: England
- Sovereign state: United Kingdom
- Police: Lancashire
- Fire: Lancashire
- Ambulance: North West

Walton Summit is an industrial area between Clayton Brook and Bamber Bridge, near Preston in Lancashire, England. It is in the South Ribble district. It is near the M61, M65 and M6 motorways and has a short length of single carriageway motorway from the M65/M61 roundabout. Walton Summit also includes the smaller area of Seed Lee.

== History ==
The area does not have a long industrial past. As late as 1960, the area remained largely rural despite the then recent construction of the Preston Bypass section of the new M6 motorway. Despite this, the area was important toward the south east near Brindle as the summit of the Lancaster Canal's Walton Summit canal basin. This southerly stretch of canal was linked to the northern section at its Preston basin via the Lancaster Canal Tramroad, locally known as "Old Tram Road".

== See also ==
- Listed buildings in Walton-le-Dale
