= Gregson Lane =

Village in Lancashire, England

Coordinates: 53.733°N 2.619°W

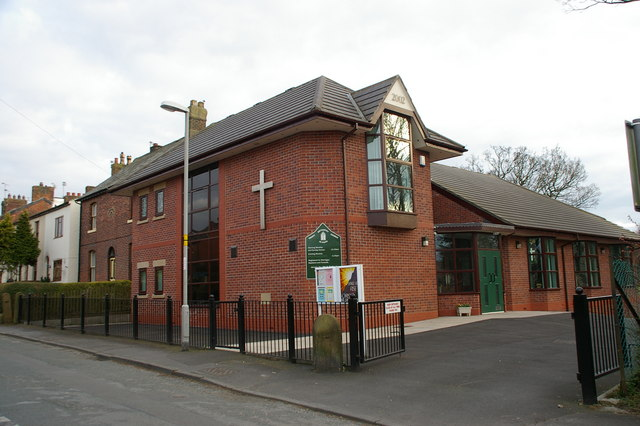
- Trinity Methodist Church, Gregson Lane

- Shown within South Ribble Location within Lancashire
- OS grid reference: SD591265
- Civil parish: unparished
- District: South Ribble
- Shire county: Lancashire
- Region: North West
- Country: England
- Sovereign state: United Kingdom
- Post town: PRESTON
- Postcode district: PR5
- Dialling code: 01254; 01772
- Police: Lancashire
- Fire: Lancashire
- Ambulance: North West
- UK Parliament: Ribble Valley

Gregson Lane is a village in Lancashire, England. It is situated between Bamber Bridge, Higher Walton, Coupe Green and Brindle, and is within four miles of the city of Preston.

Most of the village is in an unparished area of South Ribble borough and Ribble Valley parliamentary constituency. However, a small part of the village lies in Brindle civil parish in the Borough of Chorley and Chorley parliamentary constituency.

The village is situated in the Hoghton postal district, as the Royal Mail does not recognise it as a separate village; this postal district also includes Coupe Green and Hoghton is often called the village of two halves by residents. Despite this, it is administratively and geographically separate. The village is in the Gregson Lane & Coupe Green ward which elects two councillors. At the May 2023 election, James Gleeson for Labour party was elected.

== Bus services ==
The bus service founded in the village in 1910 became the first service operated by the newly formed Ribble Motor Services in 1919, which was a major operator of buses throughout Lancashire until taken over by the Stagecoach Group in the 1980s and renamed Stagecoach in Lancashire, becoming the Lancashire division of Stagecoach North West.

Gregson Lane is currently served by the Stagecoach Merseyside & South Lancashire bus no. 113. The route operates from Preston Bus Station, via Higher Walton. The service passes through Gregson Lane and continues on to Bamber Bridge, Leyland and Wigan.

== Meeting places ==
Gregson Lane is also known for the folk club, which started in 1988.

At the village centre, there is a road called "Gregson Lane" where there are two pubs - Net's Bar (formally known as Gregson Lane Sports and Social Club) and The Black Horse. Previously, there was a pub called "The Castle", but this has now been demolished and turned into a small housing estate.

Within the village, the former Community Centre reached the end of its usable life, and after 10+ years of fundraising, in 2023 the village raised enough money to demolish the existing structure and build a much more suitable centre, for the benefit of all the various groups who use it.

== History ==
St Edmund Arrowsmith ministered to Catholics of Lancashire at the Grade II* listed Arrowsmith House, located in the village, before being arrested in 1628 and questioned on Brindle Moss where his horse refused to jump a ditch. He was convicted of being a Roman Catholic priest in England and sentenced to death at Lancaster Castle.

== See also ==
- Listed buildings in Walton-le-Dale
