= Clayton Brook =

Village In Lancashire, England

Coordinates: 53.710°N 2.637°W

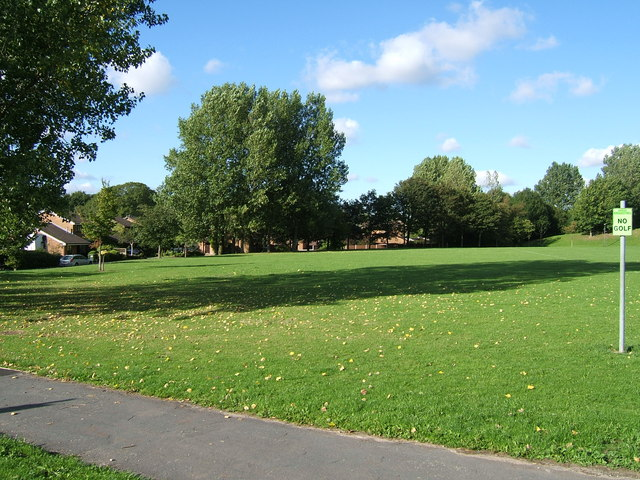
- Clayton Brook village green

- Shown within Chorley Borough Location within Lancashire
- OS grid reference: SD579239
- Civil parish: Clayton-le-Woods
- District: Chorley
- Shire county: Lancashire
- Region: North West
- Country: England
- Sovereign state: United Kingdom
- Post town: PRESTON / CHORLEY
- Postcode district: PR5 / PR6
- Dialling code: 01772
- Police: Lancashire
- Fire: Lancashire
- Ambulance: North West
- UK Parliament: Chorley

Clayton Brook is a large residential estate in Lancashire, between the city of Preston and the town of Chorley. It forms part of the Clayton-le-Woods civil parish, and is in the Clayton-le-Woods North ward of the borough of Chorley.

== History ==
Reminders of the area's navigable past remain, with the nearby Tramway Lane linking the estate to junction 2 of the M65 and 9 of the M61. Bridge 10 of the canal stretch also remains, albeit ruined and amongst overgrowth, It ran up behind Woodfield where skate board hill is now, that was the tramway with the terminus at the top near Carr Barn Brow where now stand Briary Court, in nearby farmland across the motorway from the summit.

Clayton Brook was built in the late 1970s and early 1980s by the Central Lancashire New Town Development Corporation, which also developed the Walton Summit industrial estate nearby.

Clayton Brook pub was demolished in May 2013. Also in 2013 Clayton Brook/Community House won Community Futures for being the best self developed community out of 39 organisations in the Central Lancashire area.

== Geography ==
The village is location next to the industrial estate of Walton Summit, one-time terminus of a branch of the Lancaster Canal, it also neighbours Clayton Green, Hoghton and Brindle, and is not far from the small town of Bamber Bridge. Clayton Brook Village as it is often termed, is bounded by the A6 road and the M61 and M65 motorways, and is conveniently near the M6 motorway.

== Transport ==
Clayton Brook is served by two bus routes: the frequent 125 service operated by Stagecoach between Preston and Bolton, and the 114 service between Leyland and Chorley.

== Housing ==
There is a good mix of residential properties. Approximately half the 4,000 plus properties are rented, with the landlord now being the housing association group Places for People.

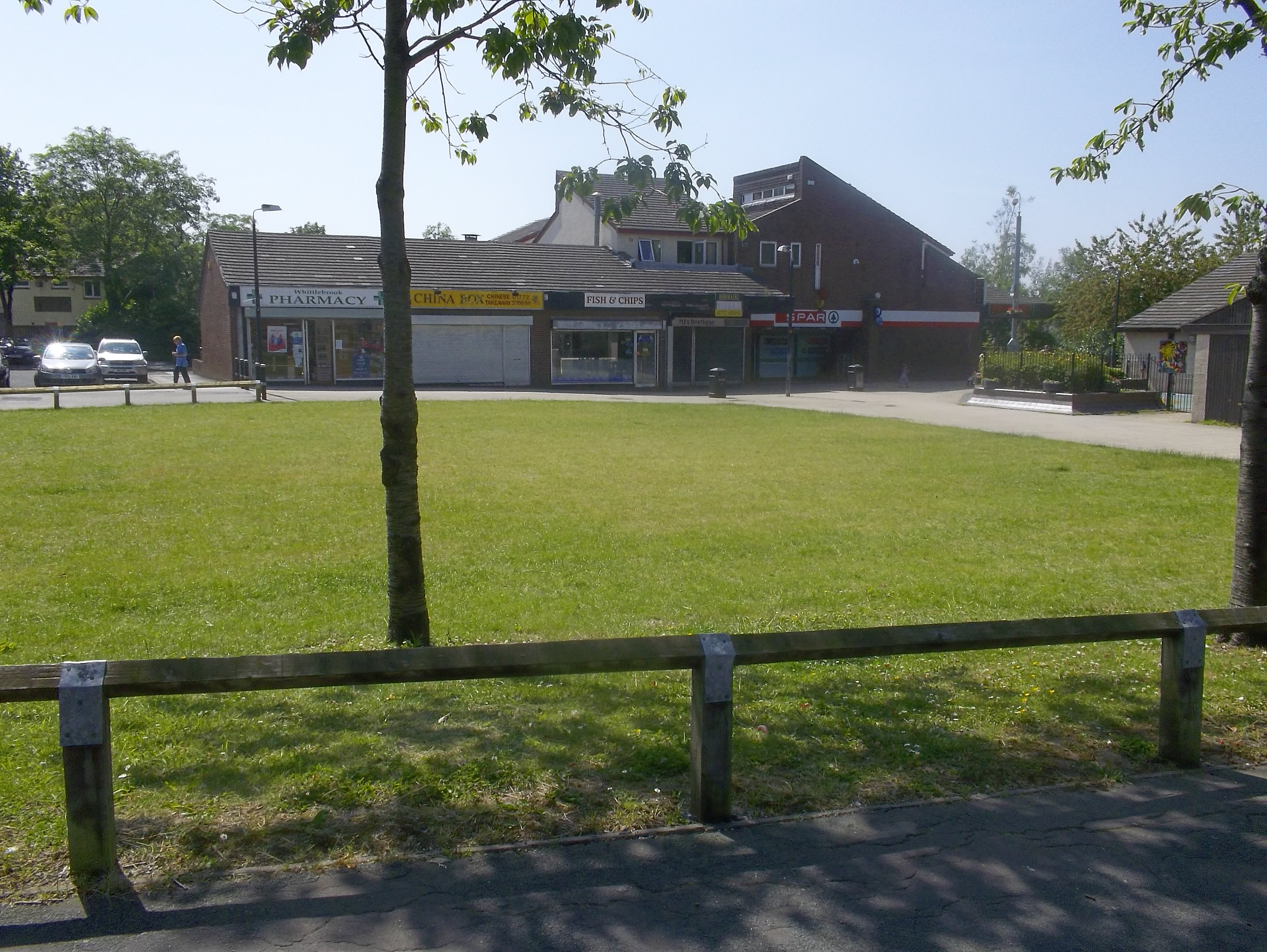
The new village green where the Clayton Brook pub used to be

== Amenities ==
It hosts several primary schools, including Clayton Brook Primary School, Westwood Primary School and St Bede's Primary School.

There are three churches in the parish of Clayton Brook, one being Clayton Brook Community Church across from the village centre. The other being St Bede's and St John the Evangelist in Whittle-le-Woods.

The village centre is only 10 minutes walk from the large Asda supermarket in Clayton Green. The local wildlife preserve is Cuerden Valley Park (the grounds of Cuerden Hall) - and there are several public footpaths within the vicinity taking walkers to a variety of green destinations.

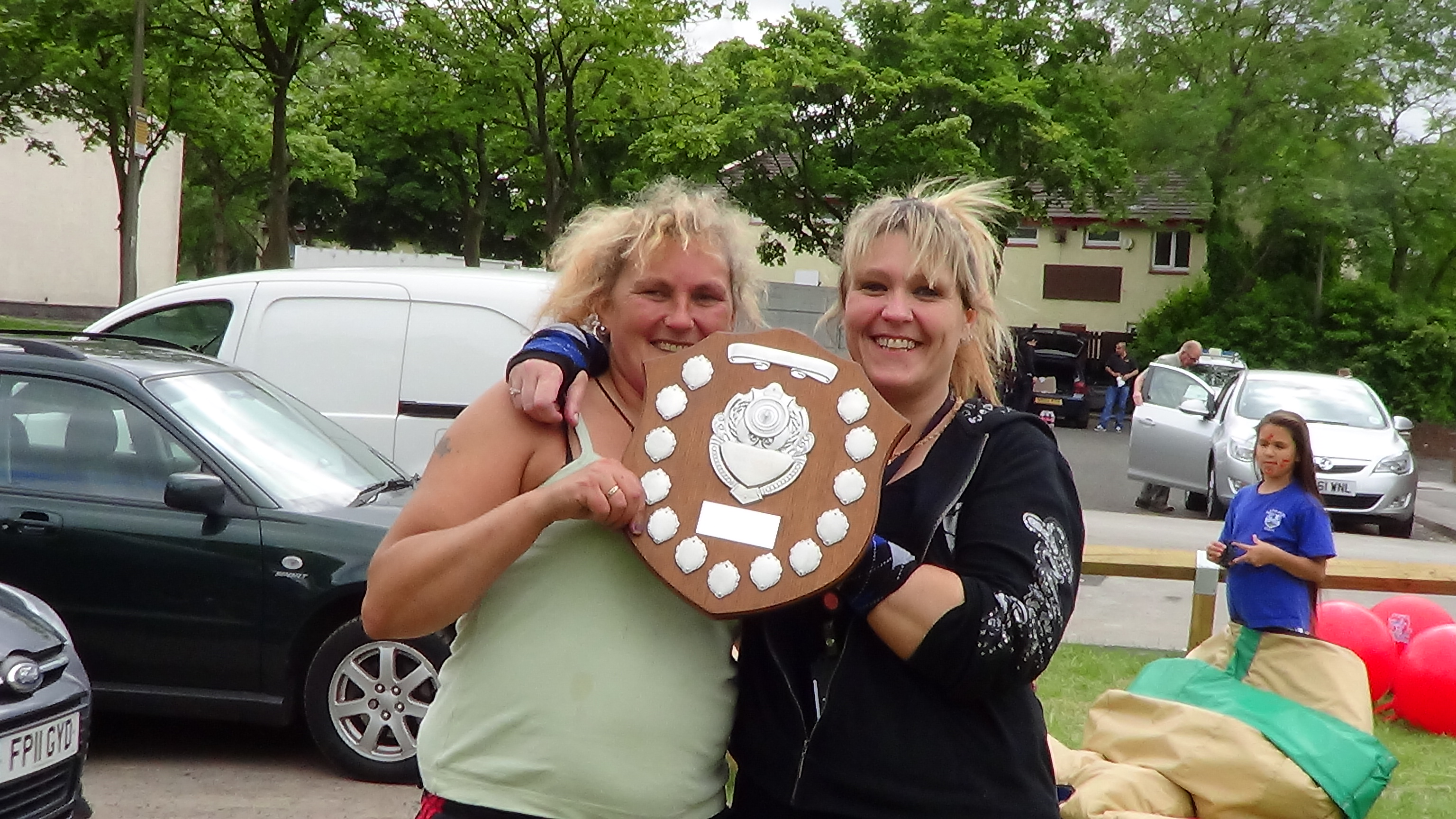
Community BBQ & Disco 30 June 2013
