= Higher Walton =

Higher Walton may refer to:

- Higher Walton, Cheshire, England
- Higher Walton, Lancashire, England
