= Preston Bypass =

United Kingdom's first motorway

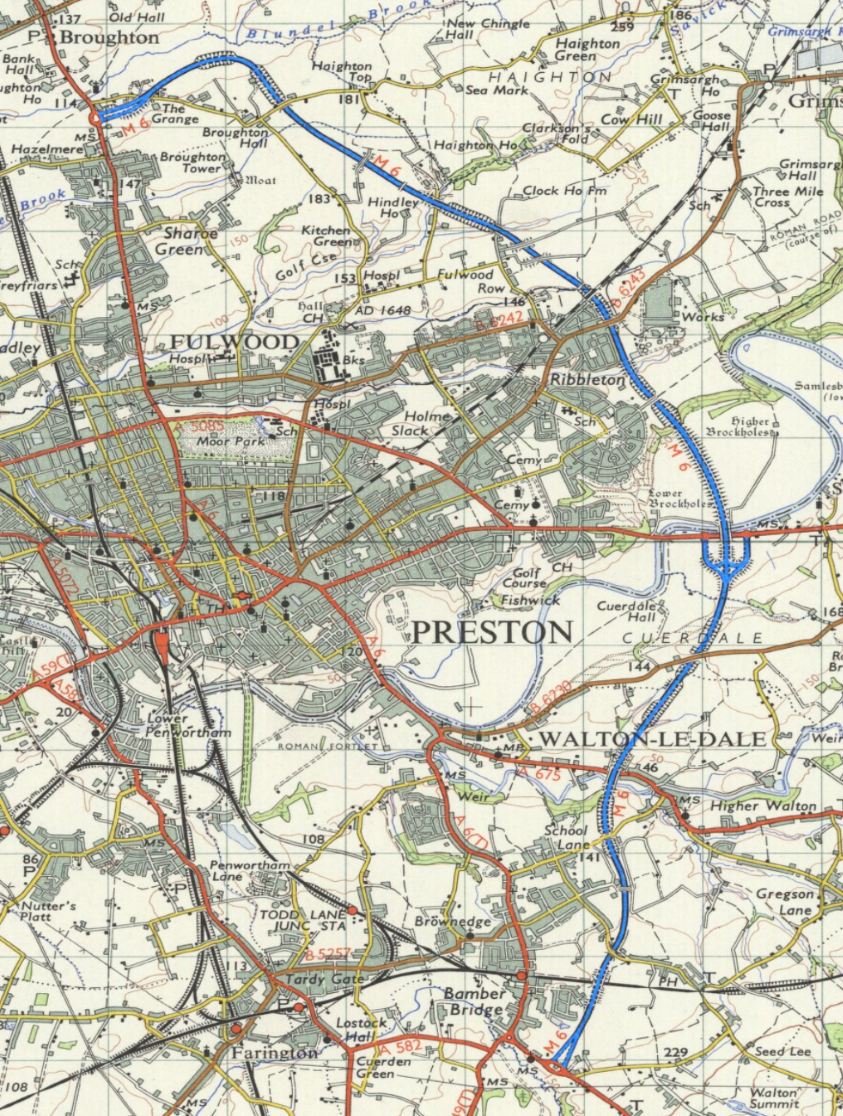
- Shown in blue on a map of 1961

Route information
- Length: 8.26 mi (13.29 km)
- History: Opened in 1958, upgraded and rebuilt in 1995

Major junctions
- South end: A6 – Bamber Bridge
- A59
- North end: A6 – Broughton

Location
- Country: United Kingdom
- Constituent country: England

Road network
- Roads in the United Kingdom; Motorways; A and B road zones

The Preston Bypass was the United Kingdom's first motorway, opened in 1958. It was designed and engineered by Lancashire County Council surveyor James Drake as part of a larger initiative to create a north–south motorway network that would later form part of the M6 motorway. The original 8 1/4-mile (13.3 km) motorway ran around the east side of Preston between Bamber Bridge (now the M6 junction 29) and Broughton (now the M55 junction 1) and crossed over the River Ribble at Samlesbury at the M6 junction 31.

Planning started in 1937, despite the lack of legal powers permitting motorway construction until the introduction of the Special Roads Act 1949. Early work was hampered by heavy rainfall, resulting in the postponement of various heavy engineering works, such as the base foundation; the result of the weather meant the original two-year plan was delayed by a further five months. The bypass was opened on 5 December 1958 by the then Prime Minister, Harold Macmillan. Nearly £3 million was spent on its construction. Weeks after opening, the road had to close temporarily due to water causing other problems when the base layer was damaged by a rapid freeze and thaw cycle.

The bypass underwent two separate lane-widening schemes, first in 1966 when it was widened to three lanes, then in the 1990s to expand to four lanes in each direction. The latter upgrade was significant enough to require reconstruction of the entire route, including all bridges, and it is now effectively a different motorway from the one that opened in 1958. As a result, the oldest surviving British motorways today are the M1 (between junctions 5 and 18) and the full length of the M45 which both opened one year after the Preston Bypass.

== History ==
=== Planning ===
Before the motorway was constructed, the A6 through Preston handled north–south traffic, leading to frequent tailbacks and congestion, especially during special events like the Blackpool Illuminations. Planning for the route began as early as 1937–1938, and by the mid-1940s, Lancashire County Council still deemed the basic alignment feasible. In 1938, Chief Engineer James Drake was part of a delegation from Lancashire that travelled to Germany to gather insights for the plan. The proposed route was incorporated into the County Surveyors' Society's national proposals and was subsequently protected by Lancashire County Council from future developments.

At the time, the legal framework for motorway construction was lacking until the introduction of the Special Roads Act in 1949, which permitted the building of roads designated for specific classes of vehicles. The bypass was seen as an experiment for future motorway construction, providing valuable lessons and techniques that would contribute to the success of future projects. When the proposals were made public, including a large-scale model to ease explanation, only a handful of formal objections were raised. These were resolved amicably, largely due to the close involvement of Lancashire County Council and the surveyor during the consultation process, eliminating the need for a public inquiry.

The Tarmac Group won the construction contract in 1956, which included the building of 19 bridges. John Cox was appointed as the onsite engineer to oversee the construction.

=== Construction ===
The bypass under construction, 5 December 1958

The road was originally built with two lanes in each direction and a wide central reservation to accommodate a future third lane. The compromise between the Ministry of Transport and Drake arose from concerns that two lanes would be inadequate. Initially, the shoulders were hardened with gravel but unpaved, reflecting the British term "hard shoulder". A hedge was planted along the central reservation to help reduce dazzle from oncoming headlights at night. To combat driver boredom, the design included curves, various bridges and tree planting, avoiding long, straight stretches.

During early construction, some land was unavailable due to 75 agreements with landowners, including clauses allowing farmers to complete their harvests before work began. The initial plan for the embankments had to be adjusted; excessive rainfall rendered the earth unsuitable, leading to the importation of hundreds of thousands of tons of hard fill from around Lancashire. Earth-moving works could only be done efficiently from March to June, while conditions from July to October would be too sodden and impossible during winter. In total, 3,400,000 tonnes (3,300,000 long tons) of earth was excavated, with a further 668,000 tonnes (657,000 long tons) of material imported for filling. The sub-base consisted of burnt colliery shale with thickness dependent upon the ground conditions, followed by a layer of wet mix around 9 inches (23 cm) thick and topped with 2 to 3 inches (5 to 7.5 cm) of tarmac lined with 0.5 to 1 inch (1.3 to 2.5 cm) of asphalt. The unexpected discovery of a bog in the Ribble valley also required removal. The project involved constructing 22 bridges, for which designers had considerable creative freedom. Drake proposed painting the bridges in various colours to enhance aesthetics and reduce driver monotony, a suggestion that was well received.

Originally scheduled for two years, the construction period was extended by nearly 25% due to persistent rainfall, particularly in late 1956, which delayed critical foundation work until early 1957. During the first nine months of construction, working conditions were so bad that the main contractor, Tarmac Ltd, had an extension of five months granted due to the challenging weather conditions, pushing the date of completion back to 30 November 1958. At its peak, 750 men and around 24 engineers worked alongside 50 crawler tractors, 24 excavators, 12 dump trucks, and around 100 lorries.

Valuable lessons were learned from the construction of Britain's first motorway, particularly towards using an appropriately screened base material, effective water drainage systems and the inclusion of continuous hard shoulders.

=== Opening ===
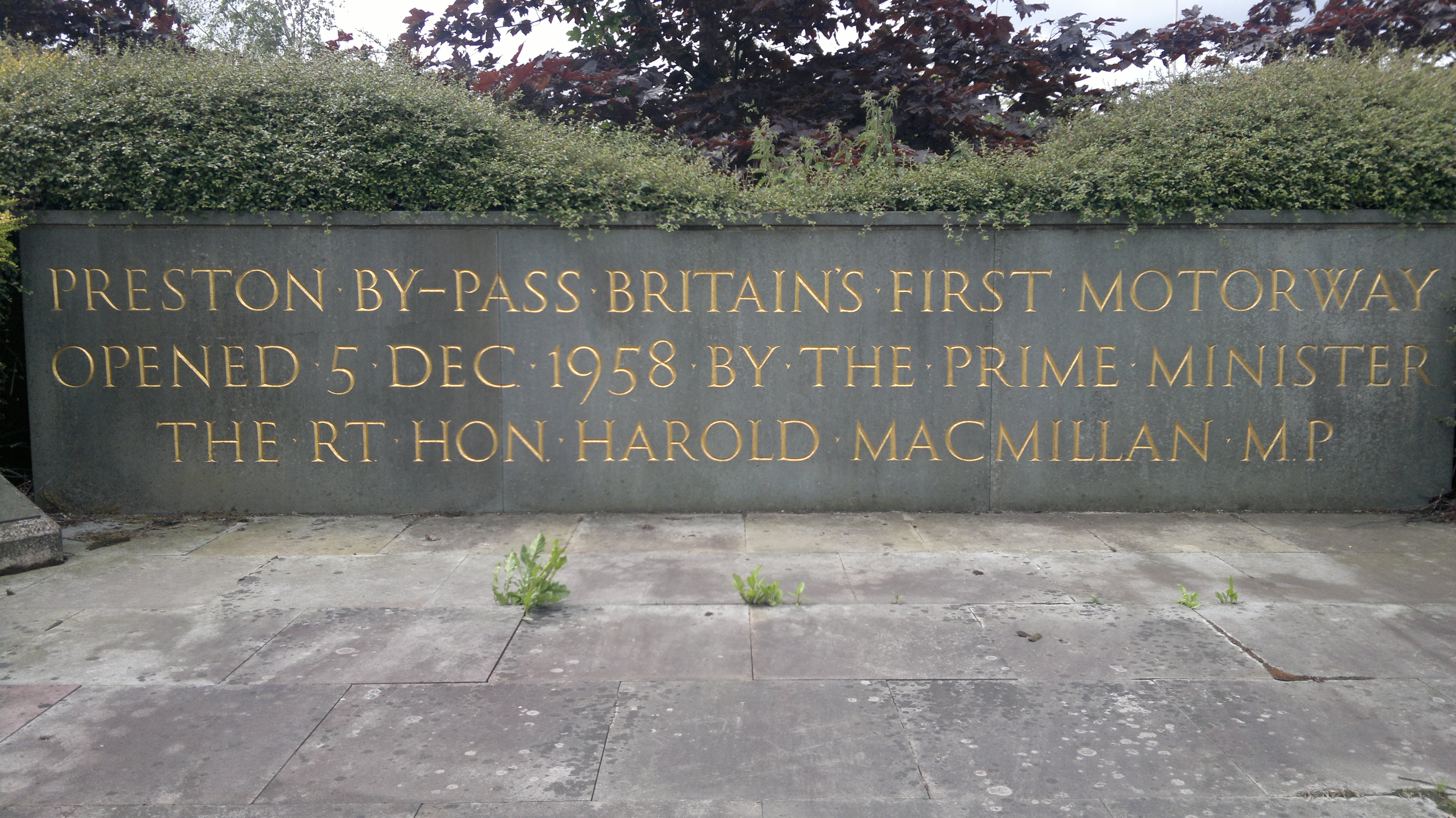
Plaque to commemorate the opening of the bypass

The bypass was opened on 5 December 1958 by the Prime Minister, Harold Macmillan, who said: "In the years to come, the county and the country alike may look at the Preston bypass - a fine thing in itself but a finer thing as a symbol - as a token of what was to follow". It had cost £2,960,481 (equivalent to £57,700,000 in 2023), of which almost £2.5M was for construction of the motorway itself and over £500,000 was for the construction of two required major bridges, those being the Samlesbury Bridge (£334,431) and the High Walton Bridge (£193,690) respectively. It was estimated that around a third of the total cost was on the bridges alone, a point questioned by the Birmingham Post, who noted that in percentage terms, it would not have cost significantly more to build the motorway as three lanes, compared to doing so retrospectively in the years to follow.

Macmillan became the first man in Britain to travel on a motorway as a passenger in an Austin Sheerline limousine, setting off from what is now junction 31 on the M6 motorway. Many hundreds of people gathered at the interchange in Samlesbury to witness the official opening, of whom many had participated in the construction and were proud of what they had achieved.

== Operation ==
The bypass being used shortly after opening, 1958

The motorway was designed to be capable of handling vehicles at speeds of 70 mph (110 km/h), although there was no speed limit on UK motorways until 1965. Lancashire Police estimated that 2,300 cars were using the road each day within the first month of opening, which was considerably less than the road's capacity. The Coventry Evening Telegraph suggested in the first weeks after opening that the motorway was losing several hundred pounds a day, factoring in the lower than expected usage compared against the construction cost. Initially, the motorway took over 1,500 cars an hour, mostly sightseers driving for the experience; however, large queues at the northern roundabout terminus resulted in considerable lost journey time on a road intended to reduce journey times significantly.

During the early period of operation, drivers reported being apprehensive about using the motorway through fear of faster drivers overtaking them, with average speeds recorded as being around 38 mph (61 km/h), despite police records for the month ending 23 May 1959 showing no vehicle being driven faster than 75 mph (121 km/h). Shortly after opening, the motorway saw its first two minor incidents; each was as a result of inexperienced drivers (in one case, an underage driver) being unfamiliar with motorway driving and losing control of their vehicles.

On 21 January 1959, just 46 days after opening, the motorway had to close temporarily to undergo emergency resurfacing work, as water had drained into the hard shoulder and seeped into the base layer. This subsequently suffered as a result of frost weathering, resulting in crumbling road parts affecting approximately 1% of the surface. The cost of repairs was around £5,000 (equivalent to £100,000 in 2023), as quoted by then-Minister of Transport and Civil Aviation Harold Watkinson; additional drainage systems were also installed alongside the carriageway at the cost of £90,000 (equivalent to £1,700,000 in 2023).

=== Upgrades ===
An additional third lane was added in each direction in 1966 using the land reserved within the central reservation without modifying existing bridges. Despite the relative ease in this work, the lack of hard shoulders at the bridges meant the number of available lanes during engineering works was inadequate to cope with the traffic volumes of the time, estimated to have been in the region of 140,000 vehicles daily. Construction of the M61 motorway in 1969–1970 to carry Manchester traffic northbound had its northern terminus connect to a new junction on the bypass at Bamber Bridge, requiring the construction of Blacow Bridge to carry the northbound M61 traffic over the M6.

The bypass underwent significant work during the early 1990s when it was completely rebuilt to become four lanes in each direction. All the bridges needed removing so a hard shoulder could be provided, despite most of them having a design lifespan of 120 years. The bid to undertake the work was awarded to Balfour Beatty in February 1993, at a cost of £37,458,986 (equivalent to £77,150,000 in 2023). The upgrade meant that the bypass was entirely reconstructed and is now effectively a different motorway from the original. The four-lane motorway had been initially proposed back in 1924 when the idea was quickly dismissed after pressure mounted from railway lobbyists.

== Route ==
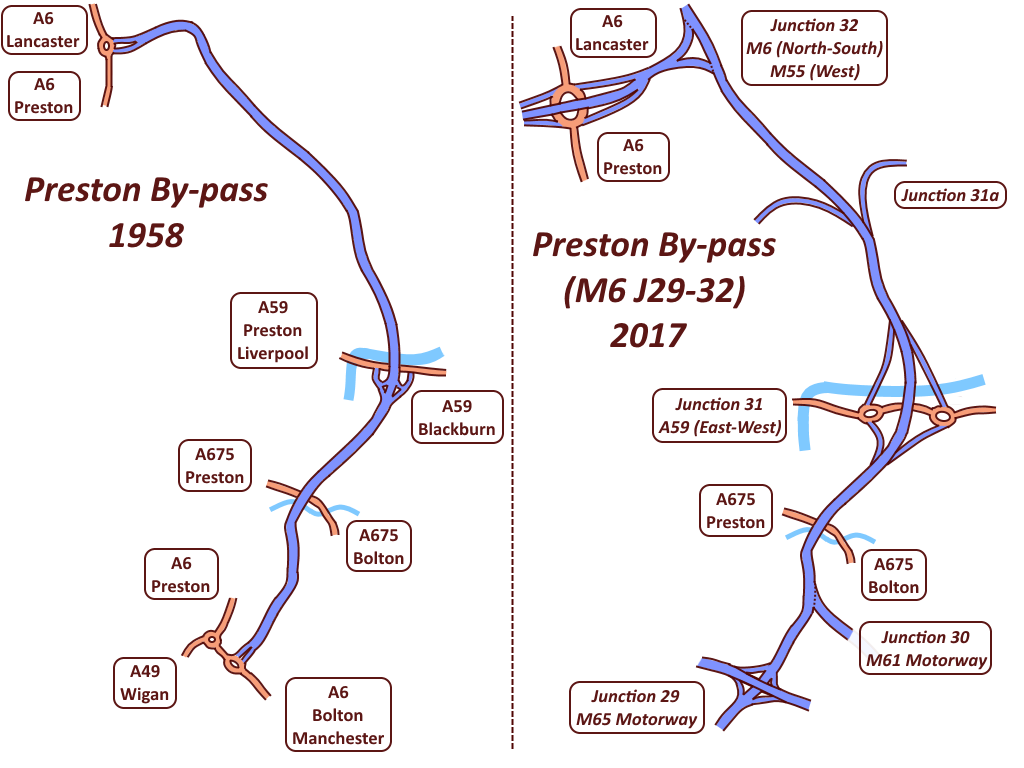
Preston bypass route (left: 1958, right: 2017)

Despite the motorway passing through industrial areas, the proposed route alignment meant that property demolition was kept to a minimum, with just a single farmhouse and three dwellings requiring demolition. The route was constructed through four separate localities, including 1.65 miles (2.66 km) through the County Borough of Preston, 2.54 miles (4.09 km) through the Urban District of Walton-le-Dale, 1.77 miles (2.85 km) through the Urban District of Fulwood and 2.30 miles (3.70 km) through the Rural District of Preston.

Initially, there were a total of 22 bridges built under or over the motorway, such as a principal bridge at Samlesbury which carried traffic over the River Ribble and the A59 trunk road, the only junction upon opening; the other principal bridge was at Higher Walton, carrying traffic over the River Darwen and the A675 road. The overall width of the motorway was 112 ft (34 m), 24 ft (7.3 m) for each carriageway, 14 ft (4.3 m) for the verges and a 32 ft (9.8 m) central reservation.

The routes around Preston, including the bypass as part of the modern-day M6 motorway, are recognised as being some of the most congested in the UK, with traffic to and from Preston being labelled amongst the country's top 25 most congested routes.

Preston Bypass
mile	km	Northbound exits (A carriageway)	Junction	Southbound exits (B carriageway)	Coordinates
		Continues as the M55 motorway to Blackpool, Fleetwood			
		Preston, Garstang A6	M55 J1; Broughton Roundabout	Preston, Garstang A6	
8.0; 7.5	12.9; 12.1	The Lakes, Lancaster M6	M6 J32	The North, The Lakes, Lancaster M6	53.8068°N 2.6978°W
6; 5.8	9.6; 9.3	Preston (East), Longridge B6242	M6 J31A	No access	53.7889°N 2.6583°W
4.1; 3.5	6.6; 5.6	Preston (Central), Blackburn (North), Clitheroe A59	M6 J31	Preston (Central), Clitheroe A59	53.7649°N 2.6359°W
1.9; 1.4	3.0; 2.3	No access	M6 J30	Manchester, Bolton M61; Leeds (M62); Blackburn (M65)	53.7343°N 2.6477°W
0.4; 0	0.7; 0	Burnley, Blackburn, Preston (South) M65	M6 J29	Burnley, Blackburn M65	53.7162°N 2.6608°W
		Continues as the M6 motorway to Birmingham			
Only the contemporary junction 31 existed on the original bypass formation

== See also ==
- List of motorways in the United Kingdom
