= Listed buildings in Walton-le-Dale =

Walton-le-Dale is a large village in the South Ribble district of Lancashire, England. In the area close to it are the settlements of Higher Walton, Walton Summit, Bamber Bridge, and Gregson Lane. This area contains 34 buildings that are recorded in the National Heritage List for England as designated listed buildings. Of these, six are listed at Grade II*, the middle grade, and the others are at Grade II, the lowest grade. The area is partly residential and partly rural. Its listed buildings include churches and associated structures, houses, farmhouses and farm buildings, public houses, and a war memorial.

== Key ==
Grade	Criteria
II*	Particularly important buildings of more than special interest
II	Buildings of national importance and special interest

== Buildings ==
Name and location	Photograph	Date	Notes	Grade
St Leonard's Church; 53.74764°N 2.66655°W		Medieval	The church is in stone with a slate roof, and is in Perpendicular style. The oldest parts are the tower and the chancel, the latter being restored in 1864. The rest of the church was replaced in 1902–06 by John Pollard Seddon. The church consists of a nave with deep double transepts, a chancel at a lower level, and a west tower. The tower is in four stages, and has angle buttresses, a west doorway, a three-light window, an octagonal clock face on the west front, and an embattled parapet.	II*
Pickerings Farmhouse; 53.72776°N 2.68215°W		17th century or earlier	The farmhouse was extended to the right in the 18th century. It is in brick on a stone plinth, the earlier part being partly rendered, and with roofs partly of slate and partly of stone-slate. The earlier part is cruck-framed, with two bays and 1 1/2 storeys. The windows are sliding sashes. The extension is taller, with one bay and two storeys with an attic, and has casement windows. Inside the earlier part is an inglenook with a bressumer.	II
Crow Trees; 53.71488°N 2.63734°W	—	Early 17th century or earlier	A brick house with stone dressings and a slate roof. It has two storeys and an attic and a three-bay front, with an outshut to the rear and later extensions. On the front is decorative brickwork forming lozenge-shaped patterns. The door is in the third bay and has a modern gabled canopy, and the windows are mullioned. Inside the house is one full cruck truss, an inglenook, and a bressumer.	II*
Old Lemon House; 53.72061°N 2.64856°W	—	Early 17th century	Originally a farmhouse, later used as a house and an office, it is in brick, partly rendered, with a stone plinth, quoins and dressings. The house has an L-shaped plan with three bays, the left bay forming a forward cross wing. The windows are mullioned. Inside the house is an inglenook with a bressummer.	II
Todd Hall; 53.72868°N 2.68077°W		1630	A brick house on a stone plinth with stone quoins and dressings and a stone-slate roof. There are three bays, the outer bays being projecting gabled wings. The house has two storeys with attics, and the windows are mullioned. The porch has a moulded doorcase with a Tudor arched inscribed lintel. Inside the house is an inglenook with a bressumer, and a spiral staircase.	II*
Bank Head Farmhouse; 53.72808°N 2.63062°W		1639	A stone house, rendered on the sides and rear, with a concrete tile roof in two storeys. Originally with two bays, the house was later extended by two bays to the right. The first two bays have a plinth, quoins, and a doorway with an inscribed lintel. The ground floor windows are mullioned, and the other windows on the front are casements. At the rear, three windows are mullioned, and the others are top-hung casements.	II
Arrowsmith House; 53.73363°N 2.61827°W		17th century	A house mainly in stone, with some brick, on a plinth and with quoins. The roof is thatched and covered with corrugated sheet. There are two storeys and four bays, the gable facing the road. On the front is a two-storey gabled porch with a moulded head and jambs, and a hood mould. Above it is a window with an inscribed head. The types of windows vary, some of them being mullioned. Inside the house are back-to-back inglenook fireplaces and timber-framed partitions.	II*
Lime Kiln Farmhouse; 53.73552°N 2.68125°W		17th century	The farmhouse is in brick, rendered at the front and sides, with a roof partly of slate and partly of stone-slate. The original house had two bays, and a three-bay extension facing west was added later. It is in two storeys and has a gabled brick porch. The windows are casements.	II
Seed Lee Farmhouse; 53.71943°N 2.63248°W	—	17th century (probable)	A rendered timber-framed farmhouse with a slate roof, in two storeys and with three bays. On the front is a two-storey gabled staircase turret, and a two-storey jettied porch with a round doorway and a stone bench. Some of the windows are casements, and others are sliding sashes. Inside the house is visible timber-framing, and inglenooks with bressumers.	II*
Unicorn Inn; 53.74660°N 2.67329°W		17th century	The inn has been extended on a number of occasions, giving it a T-shaped plan. The "leg" has one storey, and the other parts are in 1 1/2 and two storeys. The building is pebbledashed with a roof of concrete slates and other materials. Some windows are sashes, and others are casements. At the rear is a mounting block built into the wall.	II
Ye Olde Hob Inn; 53.72167°N 2.66215°W		17th century	A public house in stone, the lower storey pebbledashed and the upper storey rendered with applied timber, and with a thatched roof. It has two low storeys and five bays, the two bays on the right having been added later. On the left corner is a four-step mounting block. The windows in the first three bays have been altered, those in the upper floor being oriels. The other bays have rectangular windows in the ground floor and casements above.	II
Higher Seed Lee Farmhouse; 53.72092°N 2.63198°W	—	Mid 17th century (probable)	A stone farmhouse with a slate roof, in two storeys and with three bays. On the front is a modern porch, and the windows are mullioned. To the right is a former shippon with a stone-slate roof. Inside the house is an inglenook with a bressumer, and timber-framed partitions.	II
Higher Shuttling Fields Farmhouse; 53.73290°N 2.63701°W	—	c. 1660	A brick farmhouse on a stone plinth with stone quoins and a slate roof. It has two storeys with an attic, and a cruciform plan formed by the addition of a two-storey service wing to the south side and a 1 1/2 porch to the north. The windows are mullioned, most with hood moulds. Inside the house is an inglenook and a bressumer, and there are timber-framed partitions in the upper floor.	II
Osbaldeston House; 53.74621°N 2.64979°W		1661	The house is in brick on a stone plinth with stone dressings and a slate roof. It has an L-shaped plan with two two-bay ranges at right angles. The older range has 2 1/2 storeys, and has quoins and mullioned windows. In the outer angle between the ranges is a two-storey gabled porch, with the ground floor in stone containing a chamfered doorway, over which is a datestone and a mullioned window. The later range has two storeys and contains sash windows.	II*
The Cottage; 53.74575°N 2.67419°W		1675	A house in roughcast brick with a concrete slate roof. It has two storeys and three bays, the left bay protruding forward to give the house an L-shaped plan. On the front is a single-storey gabled porch, above which is a rectangular datestone. All the windows are modern casements. Inside the house are timber-framed partitions, and an inglenook with a bressumer.	II
New House Farmhouse; 53.72827°N 2.64516°W		1697	The house is rendered with a slate roof and has two storeys. It has a T-shaped plan, with two bays and a two-bay cross wing on the right. In the angle is a two-storey gabled porch with a moulded doorcase, the moulding being stepped over the lintel which carries an inscription, and a hood mould. To the right the windows are casements, and elsewhere they have been altered. At the rear is another porch, and more altered windows.	II
Barn, Cooper House Farm; 53.73646°N 2.62650°W		c. 1700	The barn is in brick with stone dressings, including quoins, and has a stone-slate roof. It contains a wagon entrance, a doorway, windows, and ventilation slits.	II
Cooper House Farmhouse, wall and gate piers 53.73656°N 2.62687°W		1711	The farmhouse is in brick, rendered on the front and sides, on a stone plinth, with some quoins and a roof mainly in slate with some stone-slate. It has two storeys with attics, and an L-shaped plan, with three bays, the left bay projecting forward. On the front is a single-storey gabled porch, casement windows, and two gabled dormers. On the front of the first bay the openings have been altered, and there is a small attic window in the gable with an inscribed plaque under it. Inside the house are back-to-back inglenooks, one with a bressumer. In front of the house is a stone garden wall with rounded coping and ball finials, and two square gate piers with large capitals, also with ball finials.	II
Barn and yard wall, Old Lemon House; 53.72038°N 2.64818°W	—	Early 18th century (probable)	The barn is mainly in brick, with a stone plinth, quoins, and end walls, and it has a roof of felted stone-slate. There are five bays, and the barn contains a wagon door, various windows, a circular pitching hole, and ventilation holes in diamond patterns. Attached to a corner of the barn is a stone wall with rounded coping, ending in a round-headed gatepost.	II
Farm building, Old Lemon House; 53.72027°N 2.64847°W	—	Early 18th century	The building, probably a stable, was later extended. It is in stone and brick, with a stone plinth, quoins, and dressings, and has a roof of corrugated sheeting. The building has two storeys and four bays, the fourth bay having been added later, and it contains doorways and windows. The yard wall is included in the listing.	II
Barn, Pickering's Farm; 53.72780°N 2.68182°W		18th century (probable)	A former barn in brick on a stone plinth, with stone quoins, and a slate roof. It has an L-shaped plan with a main range of four bays and an outshut to the rear. The barn contains a wagon doorway with an elliptical arch, windows, doorways, and ventilation slits. (Note: Street View in August 2015 shows that the barn has been converted for domestic use.)	II
Barn, Todd Hall; 53.72856°N 2.68037°W		18th century (probable)	The former barn is in brick with a stone-slate roof and has four bays. It contains wagon entrances, modern windows, and a blocked owl hole in the apex of the left gable. (Note: Street View in August 2015 shows that the barn has been converted for domestic use.)	II
Walton Bridge; 53.75296°N 2.67963°W		1779–81	The bridge carries the A6 road over the River Ribble. It was designed by J. S. and R. Laws, and was widened between 1939 and 1950. The bridge is built in sandstone and consists of three long segmental arches with rusticated voussoirs. It has V-shaped cutwaters with pilasters above, a dentilled cornice, and a plain parapet with rounded coping.	II
Sundial; 53.74744°N 2.66650°W	—	1788	The sundial is in the churchyard of St Leonard's Church. It is in stone, stands on a square base, and consists of a pedestal that has a moulded foot, fluting towards the top and a moulded capital. On the top is a brass inscribed plate, and a scrolled gnomon.According to a church warden, who was asked as to the whereabouts of the sundial, it was stolen some time ago, and its location is currently unknown.	II
Black Brook House; 53.73899°N 2.62343°W	—	18th or early 19th century	The house is in stuccoed stone with a hipped slate roof. It has two storeys and a roughly F-shaped plan. The north-facing front has a doorcase with Tuscan columns, an entablature, an open pediment, and a semicircular fanlight. To the left of the door is a bay window, and the other windows are sashes. On the west front is a French window leading to a balustraded terrace.	II
Yew Tree Inn; 53.74974°N 2.67475°W	—	Late 18th or early 19th century	A public house in rendered brick with stone dressings and a slate roof. It has three storeys and a symmetrical five-bay front. In the centre is a doorcase that has pilasters, an open pediment and a fanlight with radiating glazing bars. All the windows on the front are tall casements.	II
Squash Club and Parish Rooms; 53.74757°N 2.66732°W	—	1835	Originally a National School, later extended and used for other purposes. It is in sandstone with a slate roof, in two storeys. There is a front of six bays with extensions at the front and to the right. In the centre is a wide two-bay gabled porch that has two doorways with arched heads and with blank shields above. The windows are mullioned and in Tudor style. Extensions include a squash club at the rear.	II
Watch house 53.74782°N 2.66599°W		1835	The watch house is in the churchyard of St Leonard's Church, and is in stone with a roof of corrugated sheet. It is built on a sloping site, with two storeys to the road and one to the churchyard. Facing the road is a carriage door that has an arched head with a keystone. In the rear wall is a semicircular doorway with a dated keystone.	II
St Saviour's Church; 53.71970°N 2.66004°W		1836–37	The church was designed by Edmund Sharpe in Romanesque style, and extended by the addition of a chancel and transepts in a similar style by Thomas Harrison Myres in 1886. It is in stone and has a roof of slate with red ridge tiles. The church consists of a nave with transepts, an apsidal chancel and a west steeple. The steeple has a two-stage square base, a two-stage octagonal drum, and an octagonal spire. Most of the windows are round-headed lancets, and there are wheel windows in the transepts.	II
St. Saviour's Church of England School; 53.71989°N 2.65926°W	—	1839–40	The school is Romanesque style with lesenes and a Lombard frieze. It is in stone with a slate roof, a single storey, and a front of ten bays. There are three parallel ridges, forming three gables at the left end. In the fifth bay is a projecting gabled entrance with a central round-headed doorway flanked by smaller round-headed openings. Above are three stepped windows. The other windows on the front are mullioned.	II
All Saints Church; 53.74088°N 2.64064°W		1861–64	The church was designed by E. G. Paley in Early English style, and the steeple was added in 1871 by Paley and Austin. It is in stone with a slate roof, and consists of a nave, a south aisle under a septate roof, a chancel with a three-sided apse, a north transept, a sacristy, and a west steeple. The steeple has a tower with diagonal buttresses, a stair turret on the north side, a west window, and a broach spire with clock gablets.	II
Church of the Blessed Virgin Mary; 53.73042°N 2.66758°W		1867–68	The oldest part of the Roman Catholic church is the steeple, the rest dating from 1892 designed by Pugin and Pugin in Early English style. The church is in stone with a slate roof, and consists of a south steeple, a nave with double transepts, and a chancel with a polygonal apse encircled by an ambulatory. The steeple has a three-stage tower, with angle buttresses, a south doorway, and a broach spire. There are three altars, each with an ornate reredos.	II
Church of Our Lady and St. Patrick; 53.74590°N 2.66435°W		1880	A Roman Catholic church by Pugin and Pugin in stone with a slate roof. It consists of a nave with a clerestory, aisles, a chancel with a three-sided apse, a southwest octagonal stair turret with a spire and, attached to it, a baptistry. Inside the church are elaborately decorated altars and reredoses.	II
War memorial 53.74587°N 2.66475°W		1920	The war memorial stands in the churchyard of the Church of Our Lady and St. Patrick, and is in Portland stone. It consists of a crucifix with a pediment on rectangular plinth and a square base. On the plinth are panels with inscriptions and the names of those lost in the two World Wars.	II

== Notes and references ==
=== Sources ===
- Hartwell, Clare; Pevsner, Nikolaus (2009) [1969], Lancashire: North, The Buildings of England, New Haven and London: Yale University Press, ISBN 978-0-300-12667-9
- Historic England, "Church of St. Leonard, Walton-le-Dale (1074102)", National Heritage List for England
- Historic England, "Pickerings Farmhouse, Walton-le-Dale (1074112)", National Heritage List for England
- Historic England, "Crow Trees, Walton-le-Dale (1211203)", National Heritage List for England
- Historic England, "Old Lemon House, Walton-le-Dale (1074108)", National Heritage List for England
- Historic England, "Todd Hall, Walton-le-Dale (1074111)", National Heritage List for England
- Historic England, "Bank Head Farmhouse, Walton-le-Dale (1074100)", National Heritage List for England
- Historic England, "Arrowsmith House, Walton-le-Dale (1074106)", National Heritage List for England
- Historic England, "Lime Kiln Farmhouse, Walton-le-Dale (1074110)", National Heritage List for England
- Historic England, "Seed Lee Farmhouse, Walton-le-Dale (1361353)", National Heritage List for England
- Historic England, "Unicorn Inn, Walton-le-Dale (1211139)", National Heritage List for England
- Historic England, "Ye Olde Hob Inn, Walton-le-Dale (1211175)", National Heritage List for England
- Historic England, "Higher Seed Lee Farmhouse, Walton-le-Dale (1290150)", National Heritage List for England
- Historic England, "Higher Shuttling Fields Farmhouse, Walton-le-Dale (1211271)", National Heritage List for England
- Historic England, "Osbaldeston House, Walton-le-Dale (1290091)", National Heritage List for England
- Historic England, "The Cottage, Walton-le-Dale (1211311)", National Heritage List for England
- Historic England, "New House Farmhouse, Walton-le-Dale (1074101)", National Heritage List for England
- Historic England, "Barn circa 20 metres east of Cooper House Farmhouse, Walton-le-Dale (1361356)", National Heritage List for England
- Historic England, "Cooper House Farmhouse with front wall and gate piers, Walton-le-Dale (1290115)", National Heritage List for England
- Historic England, "Barn circa 30 metres southeast of Old Lemon House, and yard wall attached at south end, Walton-le-Dale (1211260)", National Heritage List for England
- Historic England, "Farm building circa 30 metres south of Old Lemon House, and yard wall attached at south end, Walton-le-Dale (1074109)", National Heritage List for England
- Historic England, "Barn 5 metres east of Pickering's Farm, Walton-le-Dale (1211300)", National Heritage List for England
- Historic England, "Barn circa 30 metres south east of Todd Hall, Walton-le-Dale (1211285)", National Heritage List for England
- Historic England, "Walton Bridge, Walton-le-Dale (1361358)", National Heritage List for England
- Historic England, "Sundial 8 metres south of Church of St. Leonard, Walton-le-Dale (1211162)", National Heritage List for England
- Historic England, "Black Brook House, Walton-le-Dale (1361355)", National Heritage List for England
- Historic England, "Yew Tree Inn, Walton-le-Dale (1290082)", National Heritage List for England
- Historic England, "South Ribble Squash Club and Parish Rooms, Walton-le-Dale (1074103)", National Heritage List for England
- Historic England, "Watchhouse circa 50 metres east of Church of St. Leonard, Walton-le-Dale (1361354)", National Heritage List for England
- Historic England, "Church of St. Saviour, Walton-le-Dale (1074104)", National Heritage List for England
- Historic England, "St. Saviour's Church of England School, Walton-le-Dale (1211187)", National Heritage List for England
- Historic England, "Church of All Saints, Walton-le-Dale (1290187)", National Heritage List for England
- Historic England, "Roman Catholic Church of the Blessed Virgin Mary, Walton-le-Dale (1290093)", National Heritage List for England
- Historic England, "Roman Catholic Church of Our Lady and St. Patrick, Walton-le-Dale (1074107)", National Heritage List for England
- Historic England, "Walton-le-Dale War Memorial (1446765)", National Heritage List for England
- Historic England, Listed Buildings
