= Alfred Borron Clay =

English painter

Alfred Borron Clay (1831–1868), was an English painter.

Clay was born 3 June 1831 at Walton, near Preston, Lancashire, the second son of John Clay, chaplain of Preston gaol, and Henrietta Fielding, his wife. He was educated at the Preston grammar school, but also received instruction from his father. Clay was intended for the legal profession, and was articled to a solicitor at Preston, but having great love of art decided on quitting his profession and becoming a painter.

A portrait of his mother removing the doubts of his parents as to the advisability of this step, he went to Liverpool to study in 1852, and later in the same year became a student of the Royal Academy in London. In 1854 he exhibited for the first time, sending to the British Institution 'Finishing Bleak House,' and to the Royal Academy 'Nora Creina' and 'Margaret Ramsay;' in 1855 he sent to the Royal Academy a portrait of his father, and continued to contribute to the same exhibition regularly up to the time of his death.

The chief pictures painted by him were 'The Imprisonment of Mary Queen of Scots at Lochleven Castle,' exhibited in 1861; 'Charles IX and the French Court at the Massacre of St. Bartholomew,' exhibited in 1865; and 'The Return to Whitehall, 29 May 1660,' exhibited in 1807, and now in the Walker Gallery at Liverpool. This was his last work of importance, as his health failed about this time, and he died at Rainhill, near Liverpool, on 1 October 1868, aged 37. On 9 April 1856 he married Elizabeth Jane Fayrer, who survived him, and by whom he left a family.
