= St Leonard's Church, Walton-le-Dale =

Coordinates: 53.7476°N 2.6665°W

St Leonard's, Walton-le-Dale
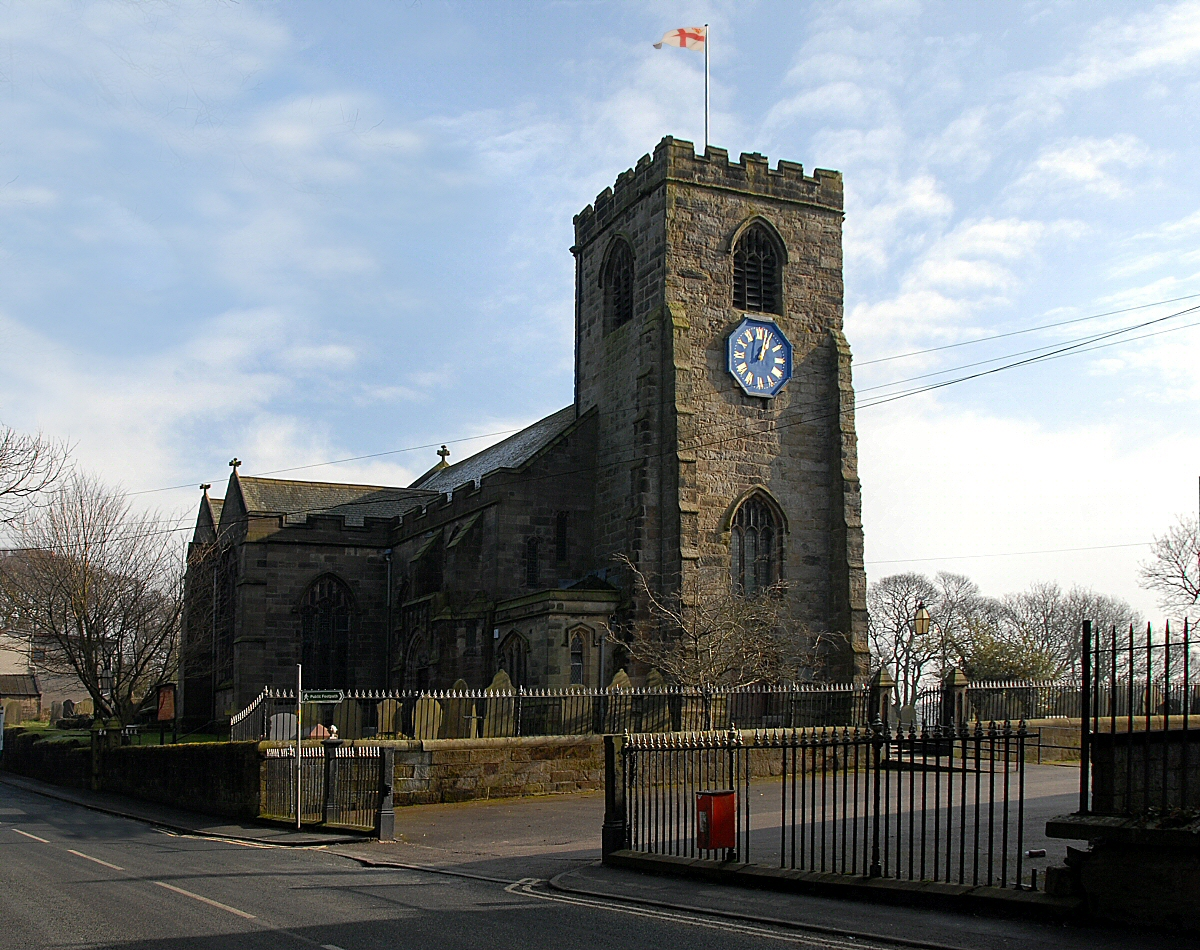
- St Leonard's from the west

- Location in the Borough of South Ribble
- OS grid reference: SD 56141 28121
- Location: Walton-le-Dale, Lancashire
- Country: England
- Denomination: Anglican

History
- Status: Parish church
- Dedication: St Leonard

Architecture
- Functional status: Active
- Heritage designation: Grade II*

Administration
- Province: York
- Diocese: Blackburn
- Archdeaconry: Blackburn
- Deanery: Leyland

Clergy
- Vicar: Revd. Stephen Martin

St Leonard's Church is an Anglican church in Walton-le-Dale, Lancashire, England. It is an active parish church in the Diocese of Blackburn and the archdeaconry of Blackburn. In 1950 it was designated as a Grade II* listed building. Parts of the church date from the 16th century and the nave and transepts were rebuilt in the early 20th century.

== History and administration ==
Parts of St Leonard's—the chancel and tower—date from the 16th century. The nave from this period was replaced in 1795–1798 and transepts were added in 1815–1816. Restoration work took place in 1856. In 1864 the chancel was restored by E. G. Paley at the expense of Sir Henry de Hoghton and Richard Assheton; it was re-roofed, re-floored and refitted, and a reredos in Bath stone was added. The nave and transepts were completely rebuilt in 1902–1906 by John Pollard Seddon; St Leonard's was his final project. The new nave and transepts were built on almost the same plan as the previous ones because of the close proximity of graves surrounding the church.

St Leonard's was designated as a Grade II* listed building on 24 March 1950. The Grade II* designation is the second highest of the three grades. An active parish church in the Church of England, St Leonard's is part of the diocese of Blackburn, which is in the Province of York. It is in the archdeaconry of Blackburn and the Deanery of Leyland. The church is within the benefice of Bamber Bridge, St Aidan and Walton-le-Dale St Leonard.

== Architecture ==
=== Exterior ===
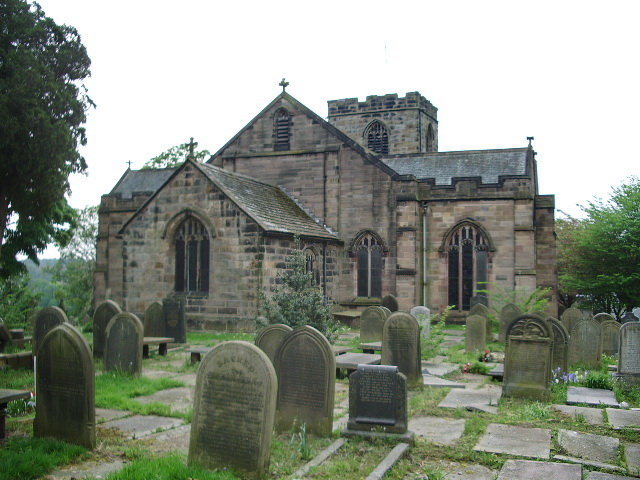
St Leonard's from the east

St Leonard's sits on a piece of high ground close to the banks of both the River Ribble and the River Darwen. It is constructed of stone in the Perpendicular style; its roofs are slate. The plan consists of a nave, chancel, transepts, a west tower and a north porch. The tower is of four stages and has angled buttresses and a crenellated parapet. On the west side there is a three-light, four-centred, arched window with Perpendicular tracery. There are three-light belfry louvres, also with tracery. There are clock faces on the south and west walls. The tower is entered through a pointed door to the west that has mouldings at the head and door jambs.

The wide nave has two bays and double transepts. They were constructed from the material (local Hoghton stone) of the same parts that were replaced in the early 20th century. Like the tower, the nave and transepts are buttressed and have crenellated parapets. The chancel is lower than the rest of the building and is plain, without buttresses or crenellations. It has a moulded, chamfered plinth. There is a priest's door on the south side.

The east window is arched with three trefoiled lights and tracery; other windows in the church have pointed lights and foiled heads. More recent tracery matches the older work on the tower windows.

=== Interior and fittings ===
Internally, the nave is 60 feet (18 m) by 42 feet (13 m). The walls are faced with sandstone from Runcorn. The size of the double transepts gives the impression of the church being longer internally north–south than it is east–west. There is a gallery on the west side, accessed from a stone staircase in the porch.

The roof has an open, hammerbeam structure. The chancel has a tie beam roof with exposed kingpost trusses.

In the chancel, there is a plaster panel from 1634 with the coat of arms of the Assheton family of Cuerdale Hall and a brass memorial from 1770 to the wife of Ralph Assheton. Stained glass in the church includes the east window from 1850 by Birmingham firm Hardman & Co. and later work by Lancaster firm Shrigley and Hunt.

== External features ==
The churchyard contains the war graves of two soldiers and an airman of World War I, and three soldiers and an airman of World War II.

== See also ==
- Grade II* listed buildings in Lancashire
- Listed buildings in Walton-le-Dale
