= All Saints Church, Higher Walton =

Coordinates: 53.7408°N 2.6407°W

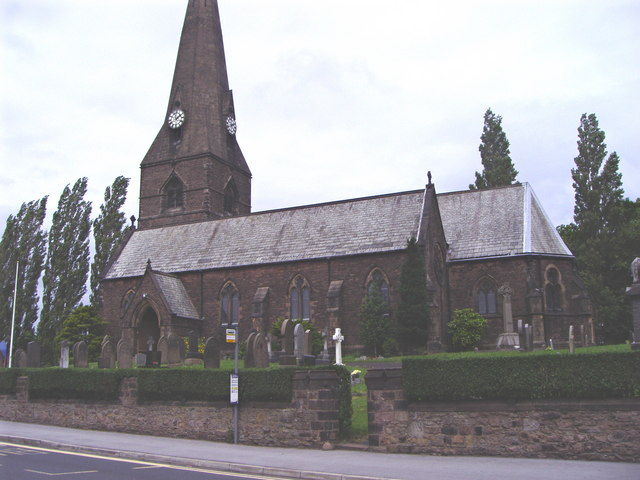
- All Saints Church, Higher Walton

- Location in the Borough of South Ribble
- OS grid reference: SD 578,274
- Location: Higher Walton, Lancashire
- Country: England
- Denomination: Anglican

History
- Status: Parish church

Architecture
- Functional status: Active
- Heritage designation: Grade II
- Designated: 27 February 1984
- Architect(s): E. G. Paley; Paley and Austin
- Architectural type: Church
- Style: Gothic Revival
- Groundbreaking: 1861
- Completed: 1871

Specifications
- Materials: Rock-faced stone, slate roofs

Administration
- Province: York
- Diocese: Blackburn
- Archdeaconry: Blackburn
- Deanery: Leyland
- Parish: All Saints, Higher Walton

Clergy
- Vicar: Rev'd Hannah Boyd

All Saints Church is in Blackburn Road in the village of Higher Walton, Lancashire, England. It is an active Anglican parish church in the deanery of Leyland, the archdeaconry of Blackburn, and the diocese of Blackburn. The church is recorded in the National Heritage List for England as a designated Grade II listed building.

== History ==
The ecclesiastical parish of All Saints, Higher Walton, was formed in 1865 out of the parish of St Leonard, Walton-le-Dale. The church, standing on an eminence overlooking the village, was erected in 1861–2 from the designs of the Lancaster architect E. G. Paley at a cost of £6,000 (equivalent to £660,000 in 2025). It provided seating for 604 people. The site was given by Miles Rodgett, and several stained glass windows in the church are erected to the memory of members of the Rodgett family. Paley donated a stained glass window depicting the healing of the sick man. The steeple was added in 1871 by the partnership of Paley and Austin.

== Architecture ==
=== Exterior ===
All Saints is constructed in rock-faced stone, and it has slated steeply pitched roofs. The architectural style is Early English. Its plan consists of a nave and a chancel in one range, a south aisle with a porch, a north transept and sacristy. The chancel ends in a three-sided apse. At the west end is a tower with diagonal buttresses, a north stair turret, and a broach spire. On the west side of the tower is a three-light window, and in the upper part is a two-light bell opening on each side. The spire has a clock face under a gablet on each cardinal side. At the east end of the aisle is a wheel window. The other windows have two lights.

=== Interior ===
Inside the church is an arcade of three short piers with capitals carved with different foliage designs. On the chancel walls are painted geometrical patterns, and on the ceiling are painted panels. The stained glass in the north transept dates from 1877 and is by Lavers, Barraud and Westlake. Elsewhere there is 20th-century stained glass by Shrigley and Hunt. The two-manual organ was built in 1873 by W. E. Richardson of Preston, and overhauled by the same firm in 1909. It was restored by Peter Collins in 2003–04. There is a ring of eight bells, all cast by John Taylor & Co between 1871 and 1928.

== External features ==
The churchyard contains the war graves of three soldiers of World War I, and an airman of World War II.

== See also ==
- Listed buildings in Walton-le-Dale
- List of ecclesiastical works by E. G. Paley
- List of ecclesiastical works by Paley and Austin
