= Josiah Chorley =

English Presbyterian minister

Josiah Chorley (1652-1719) was an English Presbyterian minister.

== Life ==
He was a great-grandson of Richard Chorley of Walton-le-Dale, near Preston, Lancashire, and second of six sons of Richard Chorley of Preston. His father's house was, as he noted, "the receptacle of persecuted ministers." After a preparatory education in several good grammar schools, he entered Trinity College, Cambridge in 1669, but his residence there was not long, because of "the terms of conformity being strait." He then turned his thoughts to Scotland. His gave his account of his sojourn at the University of Glasgow in a little note-book, which he called "Chorleyana, or a Register commemorating some of the most remarkable passages of Clod's providence towards me from my nativity, by Josiah Chorley." The first part of this "Register" was written at Glasgow in 1671–2. He later received the degree of M.A.

Chorley succeeded John Collinges as one of the ministers of the Presbyterian congregation at Norwich. The baptismal register of the congregation begins in September 1691 with an entry by Chorley. Chorley's ministry in Norwich was marked by his zeal in catechetical instruction, which gave rise to his very curious compendium of the Bible in verse. In January 1719 he was succeeded by John Brook from Yarmouth (afterwards of York, where he died in 1735). Chorley baptised a child of Brook's on 3 September 1719, and is believed to have died soon after. He is said to have bequeathed a large sum of money, to be divided between the Presbyterian minister and the poor at Preston, but nothing is now known of this endowment.

== Works ==
Chorley published A Metrical Index to the Bible, (1711). This aid to the memorising of the contents of chapters is dedicated Deo Trin-Uni O.M. Ecclesiæq; vere Catholicæ. At the end is A Poetical Meditation. A second edition in 1714 was improved by suggestions from Samuel Say, then independent minister at Lowestoft. A reprint of the 2nd edition, with woodcuts designed by John Thurston, and notes by the printer, John Johnson, appeared in 1818. It incorrectly gave Chorley's name as Joseph.

== Family ==
Chorley has been confused with his son (according to Browne, his nephew) Richard, who was educated in the academies of Frankland at Rathmell Academy (entered 3 April 1697) and John Chorlton at Manchester (entered 16 March 1699), and ministered at Filby near Yarmouth (till 1722) and Framlingham (till 1731). He afterwards lost his sight, and (about 1757) ceased to identify himself with dissent. His daughter, who lived in Norwich, was for a time insane.

== Sources ==
This article incorporates text from a publication now in the public domain: Stephen, Leslie, ed. (1887). "Chorley, Josiah". Dictionary of National Biography. Vol. 10. London: Smith, Elder & Co.
