= Coupe Green =

Village in Lancashire, England

Coordinates: 53°44′31″N 2°37′10″W

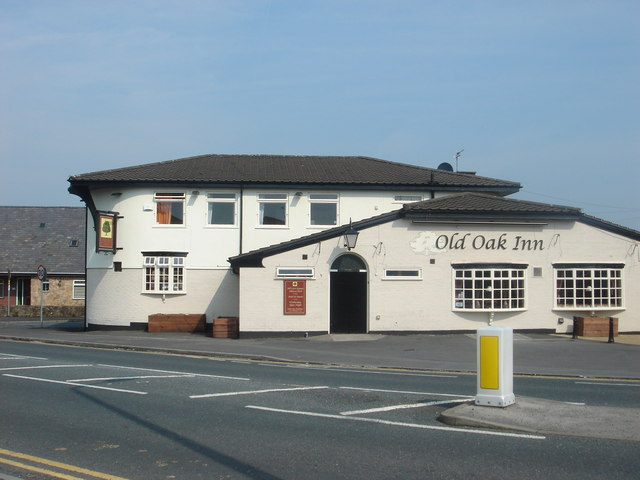
- The Old Oak Inn public house, Coupe Green

- Shown within South Ribble Location within Lancashire
- OS grid reference: SD592275
- District: South Ribble
- Shire county: Lancashire
- Region: North West
- Country: England
- Sovereign state: United Kingdom
- Post town: PRESTON
- Postcode district: PR5
- Dialling code: 01254
- Police: Lancashire
- Fire: Lancashire
- Ambulance: North West
- UK Parliament: Ribble Valley

Coupe Green or Coup Green is a village in Lancashire, England. It is located on the A675 between Higher Walton and Hoghton. The village is in the borough of South Ribble and the Ribble Valley parliamentary constituency. The village has a primary school which opened in 1975, one pub and a few shops including a hairdresser and a Texaco petrol station.

The village is situated in the Hoghton postal district as Royal Mail does not recognise it as a separate village, this postal district also includes Gregson Lane and Hoghton is often called the village of two halves by residents. Despite this, it is administratively and geographically separate. The village is in the Coupe Green & Gregson Lane ward which elects two councillors, At the May 2023 election, two councillors were elected, one from the Labour party, James Gleeson and one Independent, Matthew Forshaw.
