= Higher Walton, Lancashire =

Settlement in England

Coordinates: 53.743°N 2.644°W

Higher Walton
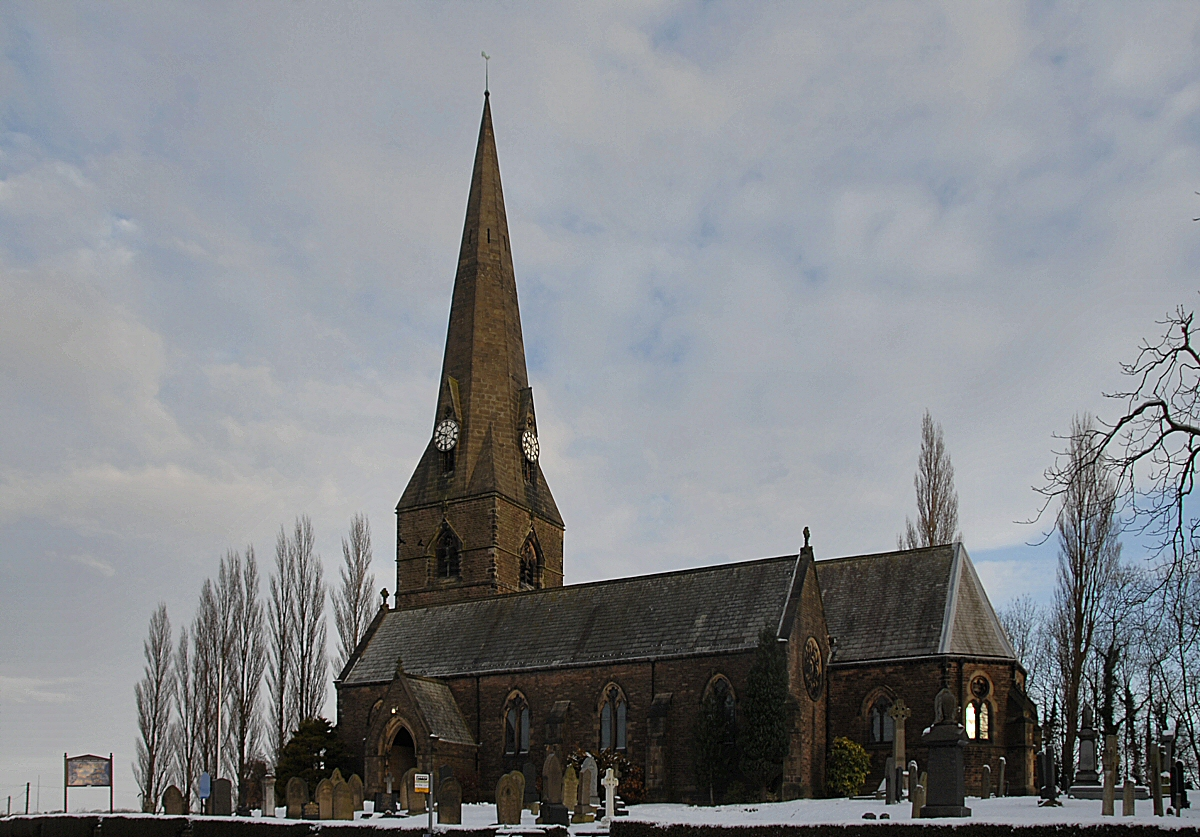
- All Saints Church, Higher Walton

- Shown within South Ribble Location within Lancashire
- OS grid reference: SD575275
- District: South Ribble
- Shire county: Lancashire
- Region: North West
- Country: England
- Sovereign state: United Kingdom
- Post town: PRESTON
- Postcode district: PR5
- Dialling code: 01772
- Police: Lancashire
- Fire: Lancashire
- Ambulance: North West
- UK Parliament: Ribble Valley

Higher Walton is a village in South Ribble, Lancashire, England. It is on the old road between Blackburn and Preston where it crosses the River Darwen. The road, at this point, is now part of the A675. Nearby places include Walton-le-Dale, Coupe Green, and Bamber Bridge.

The main road through the village has a number of shops, including a post office, a bicycle shop and takeaways. The village has two pubs - the Swan and the Mill Tavern. There is a church (All Saints, in the Blackburn diocese of the Church of England) and a primary school in the village.

The M6 motorway passes through the village, west of the centre, and crosses the River Darwen and A675 Higher Walton Road on a 474 feet (144 m)-long bridge that was built as part of the Preston Bypass and opened in 1958.

The village was formerly called Moon's Mill, and developed around a cotton mill in the 19th century.

== Governance ==
Higher Walton is in the county of Lancashire. It is part of the district of South Ribble, which is a borough formed in 1974 after the reorganisation of local government in the Local Government Act 1972. It had been part of the township of Walton-le-Dale. In 1877, a local board was formed for the township, which in 1894 became Walton le Dale Urban District.

As part of the Samlesbury & Walton ward, Higher Walton is represented on South Ribble Borough Council by two councillors, and as of 2010, both are from the Conservative Party.

== Notable residents ==
The contralto Kathleen Ferrier (1912–1953) was born in the village.

== See also ==
- Listed buildings in Walton-le-Dale
