= M61 motorway =

Motorway in North West England

M61

- M61 highlighted in blue Shown in North West England Shown with the UK motorway network Junctions of the M61

Route information
- Maintained by National Highways
- Length: 22.4 mi (36.0 km)
- Existed: 1969–present
- History: Constructed 1969–1970

Major junctions
- Southeast end: A580 – Manchester

- A666(M) – Wardley: M65 (J9) – Preston
- Northwest end: M6 – Preston

Location
- Country: United Kingdom
- Primary destinations: Bolton; Chorley; Manchester; Preston; Wigan

Road network
- Roads in the United Kingdom; Motorways; A and B road zones
← M60	→ M62

The M61 is a motorway in North West England between Manchester and Preston, linking the M60 Manchester orbital motorway with the M6 motorway.

It runs from the A580 near Wardley and heads northwest past Bolton, Horwich and Chorley to join the M6 near Bamber Bridge, just north of the junction between the M6 and M65. It runs parallel to the A6, to its northeast, for the entirety of its length, essentially bypassing the towns and villages the A6 runs through between Manchester and Preston.

== History ==
The Horwich to Worsley section began on Wednesday 1 January 1969, costing £12.4 million, to open by the end of December 1970, built by the Alfred McAlpine and Leonard Fairclough & Son consortium.

== Services ==
The M61 has one service station: Rivington services (formerly Anderton Services and Bolton West services), located between junctions 6 and 8 (as junction 7 was never built). This motorway service area was used in the filming of The Services, a pilot episode for the Farnworth-born comedian Peter Kay series That Peter Kay Thing, a spoof documentary of a day in the life of the services staff.

Originally built as part of the Kenning Motor Group, it later became part of the Rank Group portfolio, before passing on to Pavilion (Granada) and First Motorway Services. This services originally had two restaurants (one each side) and full facilities. However, due to the relatively short length of the M61 and wealth of alternative nearby facilities, it suffered from low traffic and footfall. This resulted in a lack of investment, and the site passed from hand to hand. It was also, at various times, operated on one side only, access from the opposite carriageway being via the over-bridge, or closed down completely. In 2009, it was acquired by the Blackburn based Euro Garages Group. Instead of simply refurbishing the existing infrastructure, a completely new facility was built on each of the old car-parks. All the original buildings were then demolished.

At various periods, since the building of the M61, the lack of a junction 7 has been used by local politicians as a campaign feature. This has once again come to the fore in 2022, as a proposal to relieve major congestion between junction 6 and Horwich. The two proposals are; to either build junction 7 where the M61 passes over the Bolton to Chorley road at Anderton, or to incorporate junction 7 into the Rivington Services site. Short term, neither are likely to happen.

== Worsley Braided Interchange ==
The complex of inter-connected junctions 2 Junction number 1 Former junction number A666 and A6053 M61 slips to Kearsley Interchange M61 to Preston A666(M) Kearsley Spur A666(M) to M60 M61 to A580 east M60 outer ring road M60 slip roads to A580 west A580 East Lancs Road

At the southeastern end at junction 2, the Worsley Braided Interchange, a stretch of the road on Linnyshaw Moss, earns a place in the Guinness Book of World Records for having the most traffic lanes side by side (17), spread across eight almost-parallel carriageways, in a "basketweave interchange" design. However it isn't clear how many of the lanes belong to the A666(M). The carriageways cross each other at shallow angles and make use of tunnel-like structures to spread the load, avoiding the need for skew bridges.

Spurs of the M61 radiate from junction 2 to four surrounding junctions, effectively creating one large interchange, consisting of the following junctions:

- The Kearsley Interchange links the A666 and A6053 to M61 junctions 2 and 3. (Note: Confusingly, the A666 southbound approach to this junction has signs identifying it as "junction 2", which appears to incompatible with the other M61 junction numbers. Other approaches display no number. The "Kearsley Spur" from this junction to M61 junction 2 is the A666(M).)
- M61 junction 3 links the M61 southeastbound to the Kearsley Interchange.
- M61 junction 2 (Worsley Braided Interchange) links to all of the other junctions.
- M60 junction 15 (Swinton Interchange) links the M60 to M61 junction 2 by using a short stretch of the A666(M). (Note: M60 junction 15 was once also known as M61 junction 1, and as of 2022 some Ordnance Survey maps still display this, but all road signs depicting "1" have been removed as the actual junction 1 is on the A580. Some sources name the junction to be part of Worsley Braided Interchange. Before the M60 was created, it was M62 junction 14.)
- M60 junction 14 (Wardley Interchange) links the A580 East (East Lancashire Road) to M61 junction 2, and separately links the A580 West to the M60 East at junction 15. (Note: "Junction 14" refers only to the M60 link road. The M61 mainline has no junction number, although some sources have claimed it was junction 1. Before the M60 was created, it was M62 junction 14A.)

The name "Worsley Braided Interchange" may also be used to describe the entire complex of five junctions. On its opening on 17 December 1970, the complex was already known locally as "Spaghetti Junction", 17 months before the opening of Gravelly Hill Interchange in Birmingham, nowadays most associated with that name in Britain, but the name did not persist.

== Lancaster Canal ==
The construction of the motorway between junctions 8 and 9 caused part of Lancaster Canal to be closed. Before closure, the canal had a southern section that had always been isolated from the main northern section, but historically linked to it by a horse-drawn tramway, the Lancaster Canal Tramroad. The new motorway crossed the route of the canal at three points. The Ministry of Transport and British Waterways Board decided that the cost of constructing three bridges was not justified, particularly as the canal was in poor condition, and promoted a bill in Parliament for closure of this section of the canal. The southernmost part of this section remains and is now classified as a spur of the Leeds and Liverpool Canal.

== Junctions ==
M61 motorway junctions
County	Location	mi	km	Junction	Name	Destinations	Notes
Greater Manchester	Wardley	0.0	0.0	— (Note: Wardley Interchange (A580): 53.5124°N 2.3661°W)	Wardley Interchange M60 Junction 14	A580 east (East Lancs Road) – Manchester City Centre, Salford	Access only to A580 eastbound and from A580 westbound. Spur goes directly to Junction 2; no access to or from Swinton Interchange (M60). (Formerly M62 Junction 14A.)
Greater Manchester	Wardley			— (Note: Swinton Interchange (M60): 53.5241°N 2.3608°W)	Swinton Interchange M60 Junction 15	M60 (Manchester Outer Ring) – Oldham, Rochdale, Leeds, Salford, Sale, Manchester Airport	Spur terminates here: no access to or from Wardley Interchange (A580). (Formerly M61 Junction 1 and M62 Junction 14.)
Greater Manchester	Wardley	2.0	3.2	2 (Note: Junction 2: 53.5317°N 2.3810°W)	Worsley Braided Interchange	To / from northwest: M61 (Kearsley Spur) to A666 – Bolton (via Kearsley Interchange); To / from southeast: M61 (spur to M60 only) – Swinton Interchange; M61 (spur to A580 only) – Wardley Interchange	No access from Kearsley Spur to M61 northwestbound, or from M61 southeastbound to Kearsley Spur; No access from M60 spur to A580 spur, or from A580 spur to M60 spur; Formerly signposted as Junction 3 for northwestbound traffic only; The Kearsley Spur is part of the M61
Greater Manchester	Wardley	2.7	4.3	3 (Note: Junction 3: 53.5374°N 2.3940°W)	(To Kearsley Interchange)	To A666 / A6053 – Kearsley, Farnworth	Exit only from M61 southeastbound to A666 / A6053 roundabout (Kearsley Interchange); no entrance.
Greater Manchester	—	5.0	8.0	4 (Note: Junction 4: 53.5448°N 2.4495°W)	Watergate Lane Interchange	A6 – Walkden, Atherton, Leigh	
Greater Manchester	—	6.9	11.1	5 (Note: Junction 5: 53.5556°N 2.4899°W)	Hunger Hill Interchange	A58 – Bolton, Westhoughton, Wigan	
Greater Manchester	—	9.5	15.3	6 (Note: Junction 6: 53.5744°N 2.5455°W)	Horwich Link Interchange	A6027 – Horwich, Bolton (North), Chorley	
Lancashire	—	11.6	18.7	Rivington services (Note: Rivington Services: 53.6002°N 2.5739°W) (formerly Bolton West or Anderton)			
Lancashire	Chorley	17.0	27.4	8 (Note: Junction 8: 53.6703°N 2.6249°W)	Chorley North Link Junction	A674 – Chorley, Leyland, Southport	
Lancashire	Walton Summit	20.5	33.0	9 (Note: Junction 9: 53.7183°N 2.6298°W)	Clayton Brook Interchange M65 Junction 2	M65 – Blackburn, Burnley, Preston (South)	
Lancashire	Bamber Bridge	22.3	35.9	— (Note: M6 Junction 30: 53.7359°N 2.6487°W)	Blacow Bridge M6 Junction 30	M6 north – The Lake District, Preston, Lancaster, Blackpool	No exit to M6 southbound or entrance from M6 northbound
1.000 mi = 1.609 km; 1.000 km = 0.621 mi: Incomplete access

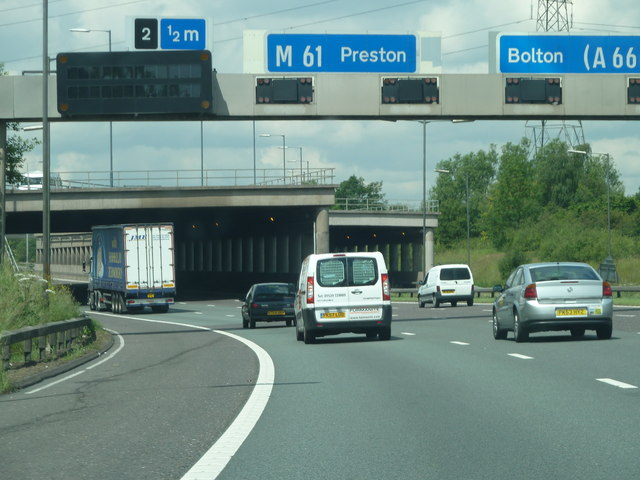
Entrance to a tunnel-like structure that carries the M60-to-M61 spur under one carriageway of the M61-to-A580 spur, approaching Junction 2 from the southeast

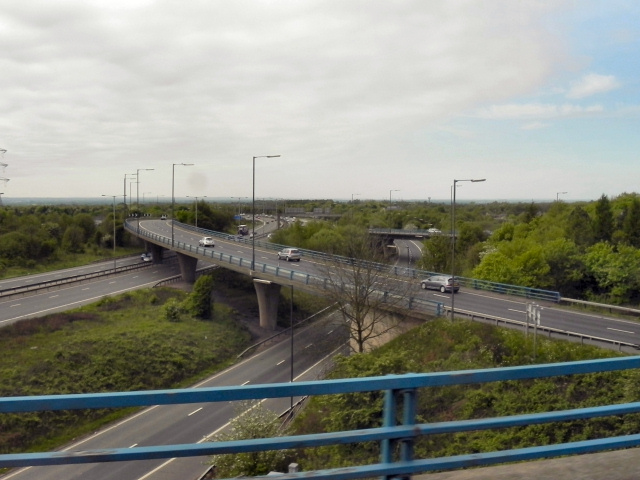
Part of the Swinton Interchange, showing carriageways of the M61-to-M60 spur crossing the M60 (left) and the A580-to-M60 link road (centre)

Mileages are calculated using the A580 spur, the longer of the two spurs at the Manchester end.

Coordinate list
