= Walton-le-Dale =

Village in Lancashire, England

Coordinates: 53.746°N 2.665°W

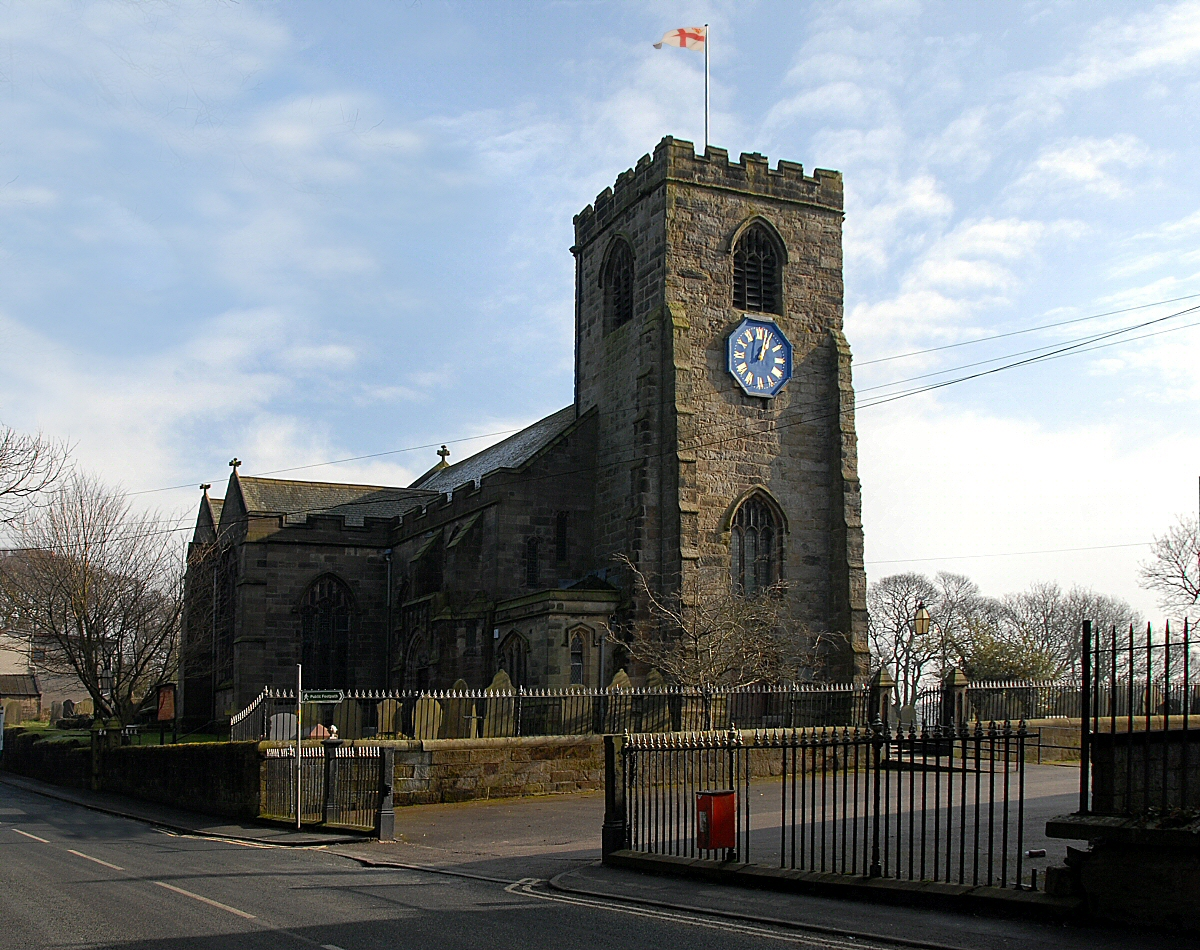
- St Leonard's Church

- Shown within South Ribble Location within Lancashire
- Population: 3,792 (2011, Ward)
- OS grid reference: SD562280
- District: South Ribble
- Shire county: Lancashire
- Region: North West
- Country: England
- Sovereign state: United Kingdom
- Post town: PRESTON
- Postcode district: PR5
- Dialling code: 01772
- Police: Lancashire
- Fire: Lancashire
- Ambulance: North West
- UK Parliament: Ribble Valley

Walton-le-Dale is a large village in the borough of South Ribble, in Lancashire, England. It lies on the south bank of the River Ribble, opposite the city of Preston, adjacent to Bamber Bridge. The population of the South Ribble Ward at the 2011 census was 3,792. To the west of Walton-le-Dale is the residential area of Walton Park.

== History ==
=== Toponymy ===
Walton is derived from walh and tun and means the farmstead or settlement of the Britons. It was recorded in the Domesday Book of 1086 as Waletune. In the 13th century it was recorded as Waleton and since about 1300 Waleton in le (la) Dale, or Walton in the valley.

=== Early history ===
The remains of a Roman fort at the junction of the River Darwen and River Ribble at Walton-le-Dale were discovered by accident in the mid 19th century. Roman remains found here include pottery and coins. The fort may have been the Rigodunum of Ptolemy, although most people locate it at Castleshaw.

=== Manor ===
Two oxgangs of land in Walton belonged to King Edward the Confessor in 1066, and after the Norman conquest, was the demesne of Roger de Busli and Albert Grelley. The manor passed in about 1130 to Henry de Lacy of Pontefract and was later granted to the Banastres and their successors the Langtons. John de Langton obtained the right to hold a weekly market and an annual fair in October in 1301. The manor passed from the Langtons to the Hoghtons of Hoghton who held the manor as mesne lord.

=== Battles ===
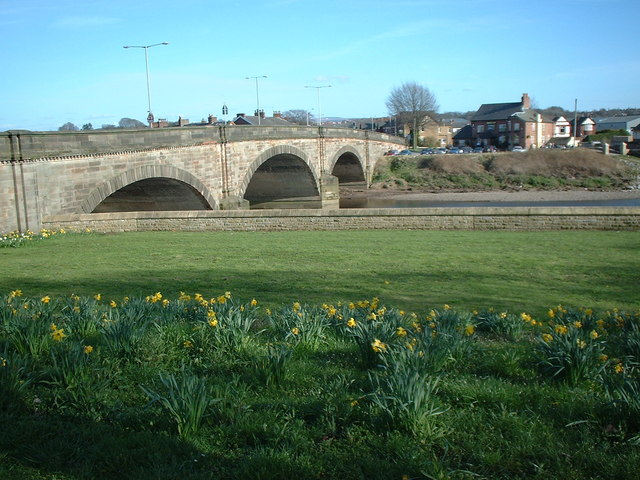
The bridge at Walton-le-Dale

During the English Civil War the bridges over the river were the scene of skimishes between the Royalists and Roundheads. In 1644 Royalists were captured by Parliamentarians and Walton was the principal scene of the first Battle of Preston, fought on 17 August 1648 between Cromwell and the Duke of Hamilton.

In 1715, during the second Battle of Preston, the bridge over the River Ribble was successfully defended against the Jacobites by Parson Wood and his parishioners of Chowbent.

=== Industrial Revolution ===
During the Industrial Revolution there were four cotton mills, including Flats Mills belonging to William Calvert which employed 400 workers and James Livesey and Son's Moon Mill employing 130 workers. There was a cotton printing business and in 1800 Robert Whittaker established an iron foundry.

== Governance ==
Anciently Walton-le-Dale was a township and chapelry in the parish of Blackburn and a part of the hundred of Blackburnshire. In 1701 the Duke of Norfolk, the Earl of Derwentwater and other Jacobites incorporated the town by the style of the "mayor and corporation of the ancient borough of Walton."

It became part of the Preston Poor Law Union, formed in 1837, which took responsibility for the administration and funding of the Poor Law and built a workhouse in that area. A local board was formed in 1877, and in 1894 an urban district council of twelve members representing four wards was formed. Walton-le-Dale was in the Darwen parliamentary division of Lancashire. Since 1974 the local council is South Ribble based in Leyland and the area is part of the Ribble Valley parliamentary constituency.

== Transport ==
Walton-le-Dale is served regularly by Stagecoach Merseyside & South Lancashire and Blackburn Bus Company buses. The Park & Ride service into Preston City Centre is located in Walton-le-Dale, at the Capitol Centre retail park. The Capitol Centre is a large retail and leisure facility, which was built on the site of the former Flats Mills.

== Religion ==
The church of St Leonard, situated on high ground to the east of the village, was originally erected in the 11th century. The earliest portions of the present building are the Perpendicular chancel and tower, the nave having been rebuilt in 1798, while the transepts were erected in 1816. There are a number of interesting old brasses and monuments.

The church of Our Lady and St Patrick is located on Higher Walton Road in the village. Originally formed in 1855 by the Benedictine order, the Parish of Our Lady and St Patrick (originally the Mission of St Patrick) includes both The Pugin Church of Our Lady and St Patrick and St Patrick's RC Primary School, and has served Walton-le-Dale and surrounding area for over 150 years.

== Culture ==
In 1701 some of the local gentry including the Duke of Norfolk, the Earl of Derwentwater and other Jacobites formed the Mock Borough of Walton, a social club, which lasted for about 50 years, and met in the Unicorn Inn, near Darwen Bridge. The mock corporation had officers which included a mayor, his deputy, recorder, bailiff, chaplain, serjeant, physician and mace-bearer but which also appointed a house-groper, jester, poet laureate, master of the hounds, sword-bearer, in 1708 a slut-kisser and in 1711 a custard-eater.

In May 2026 a public petition, to save 18 lime trees on Victoria Road from being felled, attracted more than 6,000 signatures. The trees, planted in 1912 as a tribute to commemorate the Coronation of King George V, were planned to be removed as part of the Preston & South Ribble Flood Risk Management Scheme. A public meeting, at the Yew Tree pub, to be chaired by Ribble Valley MP Maya Ellis, was planned for 8 June. A petition was raised by Ellis in the House of Commons.

== Legends ==
At midnight on 12 August 1560, under the moonlight in St Leonard's Churchyard, occultist and scholar John Dee allegedly summoned the spirit of a man who had died before giving the whereabouts of a considerable amount of money. It is said that he was successful and the spirit did indeed tell the occultist the whereabouts of the wealth, but not before also predicting to Dee the fate of many of the locals, which is said to have later come true. This section incorporates text from the 1911 Encyclopædia Britannica, which is in the public domain.

== Notable people ==
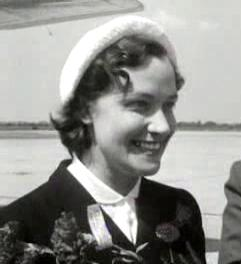
Kathleen Ferrier, 1951

- Josiah Chorley (1652-1719), an English Presbyterian minister.
- Edward Baines (1774–1848), newspaper proprietor and politician.
- Joseph Livesey (1794–1884), temperance campaigner, social activist, writer and local cheese seller.
- Nicholas Rigby (1800–1886), an English Roman Catholic priest.
- Alfred Borron Clay (1831–1868), an English painter of portraits.
- Samuel Ryder (1858–1936), sponsor of the golfing Ryder Cup and Mayor of St Albans in 1905
- John McNamara (1887–1918), Army corporal, recipient of the Victoria Cross
- Albert McInroy (1901–1985), football goalkeeper who played about 490 games
- Kathleen Ferrier (1912–1953), an English contralto singer
- Joan Knight (1924–1996), a British stage manager and director.
- Ian McCulloch (born 1971), former snooker player, World Snooker Championship semi-finalist in 2005

== See also ==
- Listed buildings in Walton-le-Dale
