= Bamber Bridge =

Village in Lancashire, England

Coordinates: 53°43′41″N 02°39′38″W

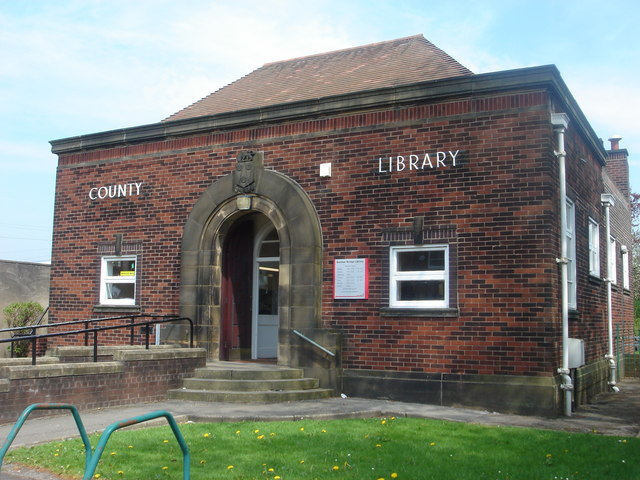
- Bamber Bridge Library

- Shown within South Ribble Location within Lancashire
- Population: 12,126
- OS grid reference: SD564265
- District: South Ribble
- Shire county: Lancashire
- Region: North West
- Country: England
- Sovereign state: United Kingdom
- Post town: PRESTON
- Postcode district: PR5
- Dialling code: 01772
- Police: Lancashire
- Fire: Lancashire
- Ambulance: North West
- UK Parliament: Ribble Valley

Bamber Bridge is a large village in Lancashire, England, 3 miles (5 km) south-east of Preston, in the borough of South Ribble. The name derives from the Old English "bēam" and "brycg", which probably means "tree-trunk bridge". People who live in Bamber Bridge are often known locally as Briggers.

== History ==
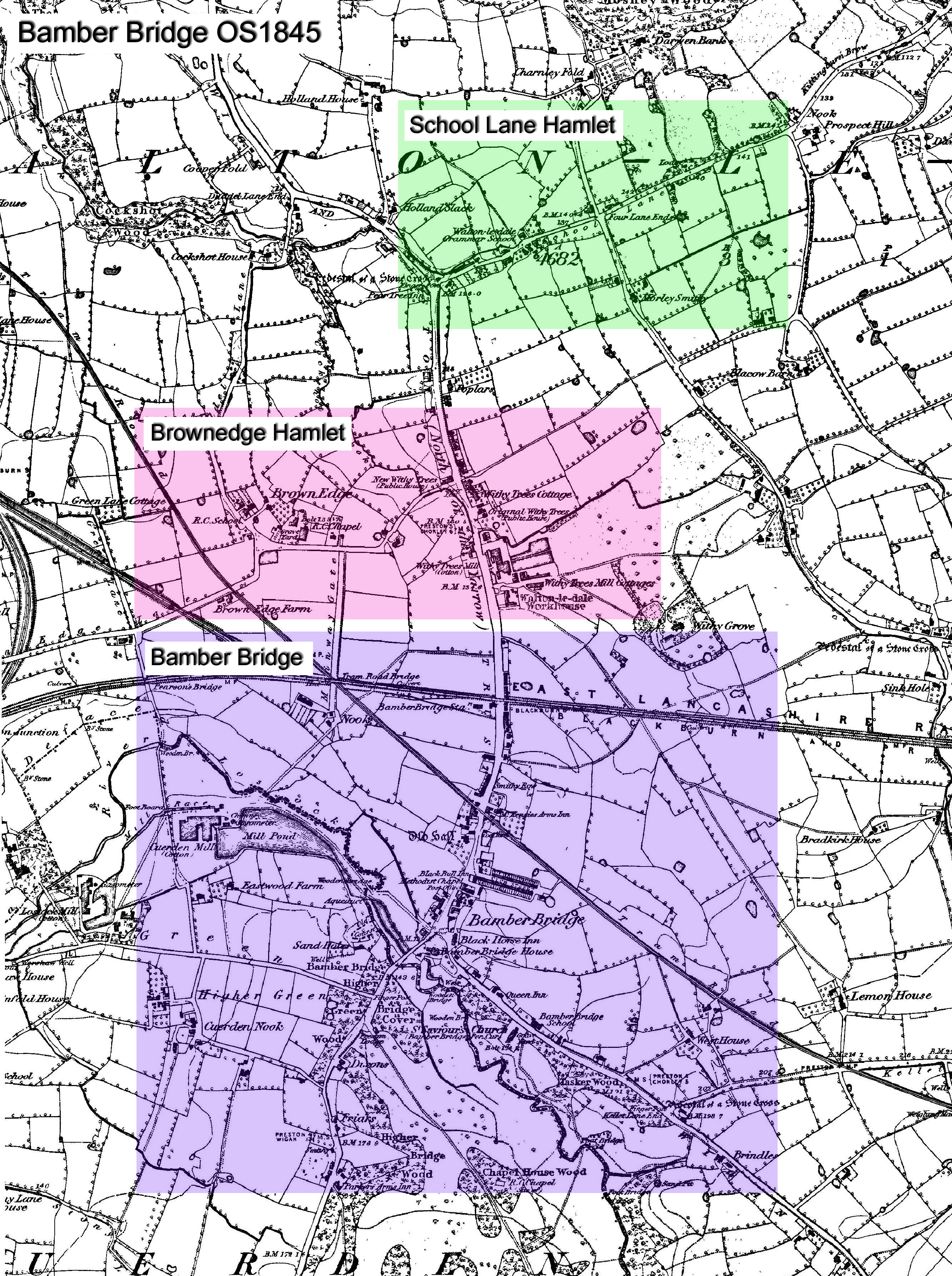
1845 map of Bamber Bridge.

=== Textiles ===
By 1764 calico printing had been established in what was then a village; this was the first example of calico printing anywhere in Lancashire. Previously had been mainly carried out in the south of England, before spreading to Scotland and the northern counties.

In 1857, as a result of the downturn in the cotton trade, a large manufacturer and spinner in the village (Bamber Bridge SP & WN Co.) reported liabilities estimated at £40,000 to £60,000, and were about to go on short time.

On 31 October 1859, the Withy Trees Mill in the village, owned by Eccles and Company, burnt down. It was reported that the spinning-master and engineer had stayed on after the mill had closed at 6:00 pm to repair some machinery on the third floor. A spark from a lamp is said to have dropped on some cotton waste, igniting it. Nobody was killed or injured, but between 16,000 and 17,000 spindles and 270 looms were destroyed and 250 people lost their jobs.

On 7 June 1862, The Times stated that 600 hands had been thrown out of work with the stoppage of Dewhurst's Mill. The same report described the economic problems of the village: 1 in 5 people in Bamber Bridge and Walton-le-Dale and the surrounding area were now reduced to pauperism.

A petition against the recognition of the Confederate States of America was presented to the House of Commons on Monday, 29 June 1863, by a villager, a Mr Barnes. No mention is made of his first name or whether he represented any organisation.

The trade unionist George Woodcock was born in Bamber Bridge on 20 October 1904. He was a voluntary official of the Bamber Bridge branch of the Weavers' Association after a spell of tuberculosis. He won a TUC scholarship to Ruskin College, Oxford in 1929. He was awarded the CBE in 1953 and appointed a member of the Privy Council in 1957. He was General Secretary of the TUC in 1960 and a member of the Royal Commission on Trade Unions and Employers' Associations in 1965 and served as chairman from 1969 to 1971. He died on 30 October 1979.

=== Second World War ===
During the Second World War, Bamber Bridge was home to the 1511 Quartermaster Truck regiment. The unit was racially segregated, and all of the soldiers except the officers were African American. Tensions in the wake of the 1943 Detroit race riot caused a major fight, known as the Battle of Bamber Bridge to break out between white American military police on one side, and black American soldiers and townsfolk on the other. A Black American soldier, Private William Crossland, was killed. In June 2022, a memorial garden commemorating the battle was created opposite the pub where the Battle of Bamber Bridge started. The incident inspired the plot of the 2022 film The Railway Children Return.

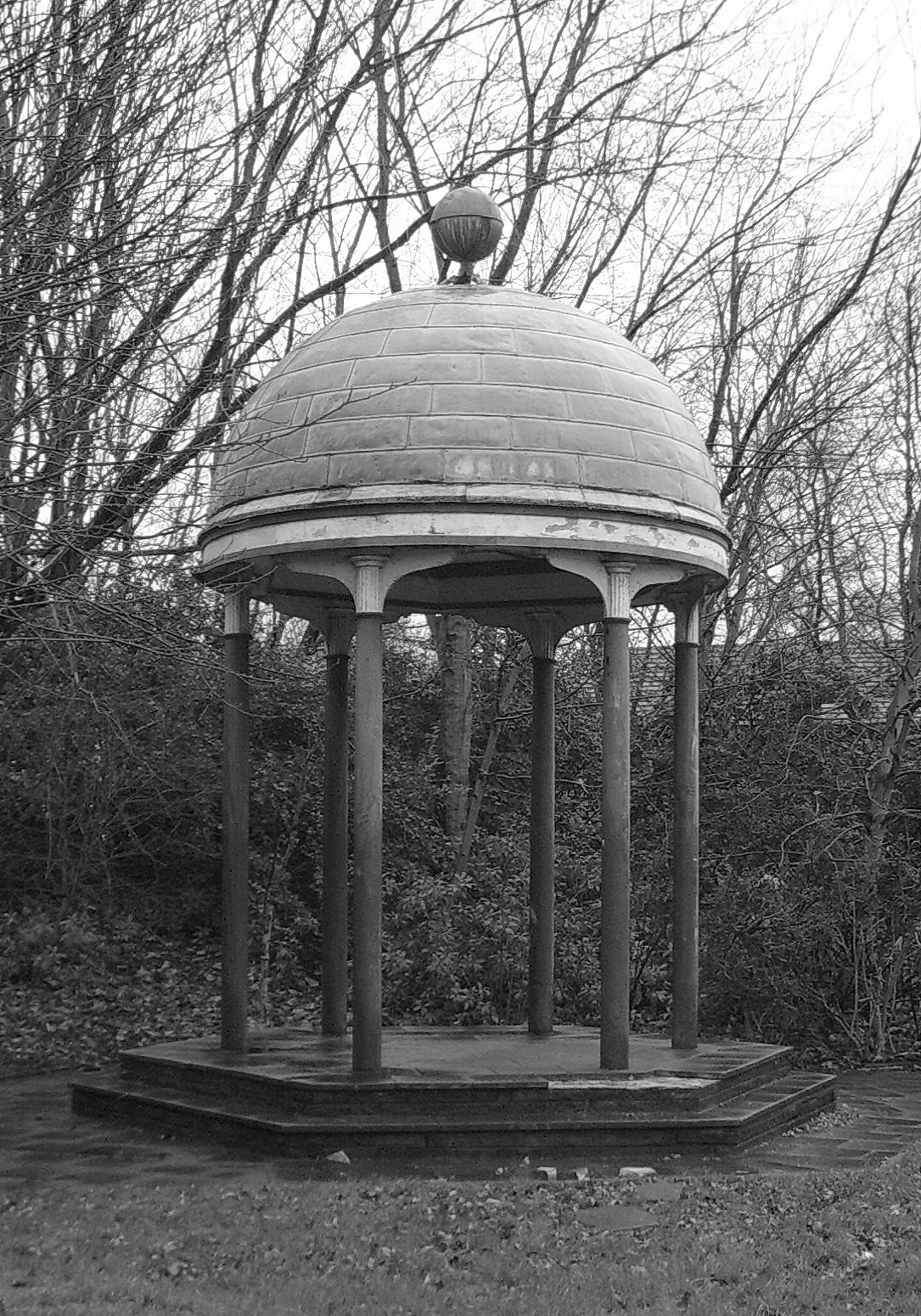
Top of the tower, all that remains of Orr's Mill, School Lane. This was originally the top part of the tower of the Bamber Bridge Spinning & Weaving Company mill, Wesley Street (image shown in this collection). A similar dome had adorned Orr's Mill.

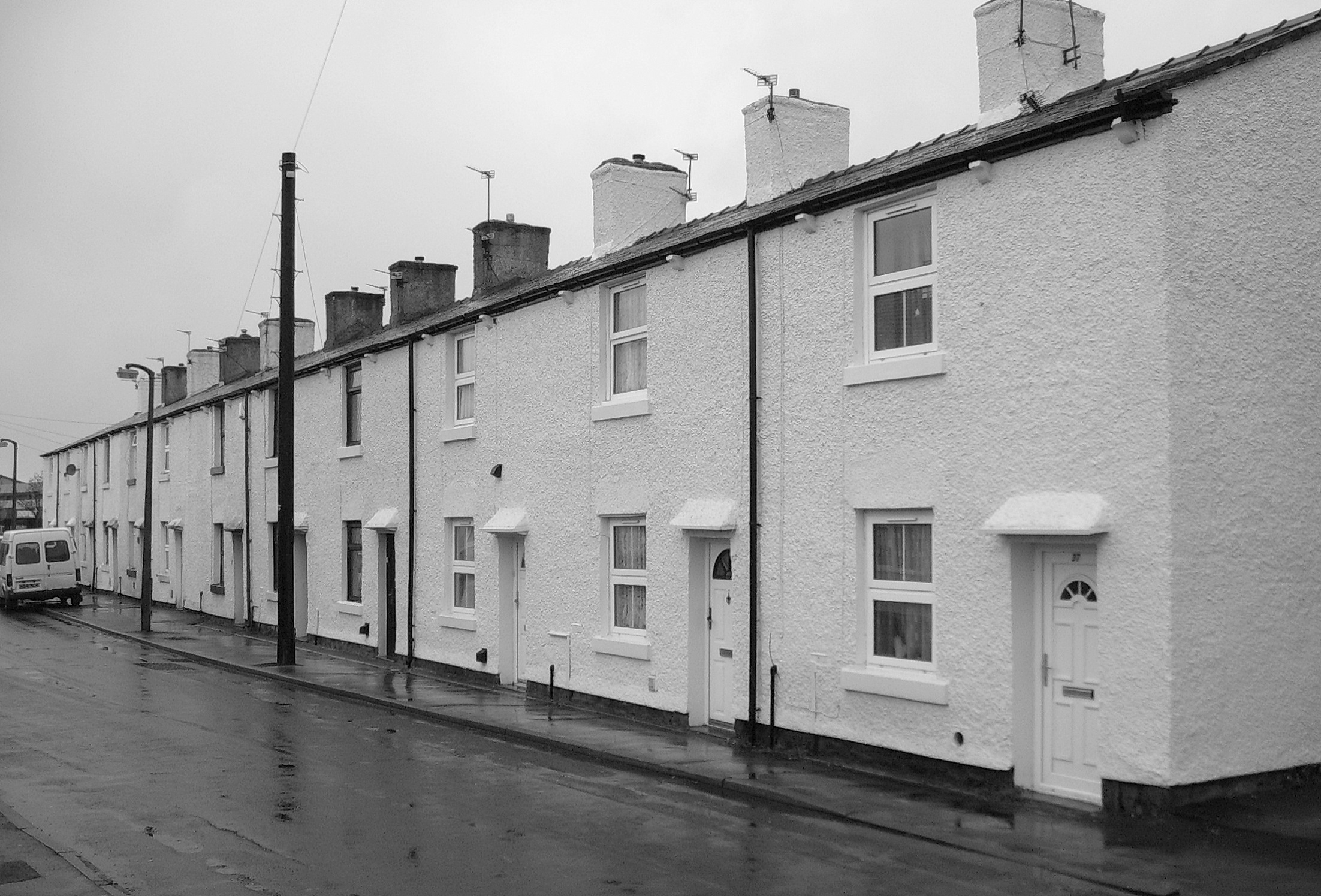
These cottages on Withy Trees Road were constructed for the hands at Withy Trees Mill

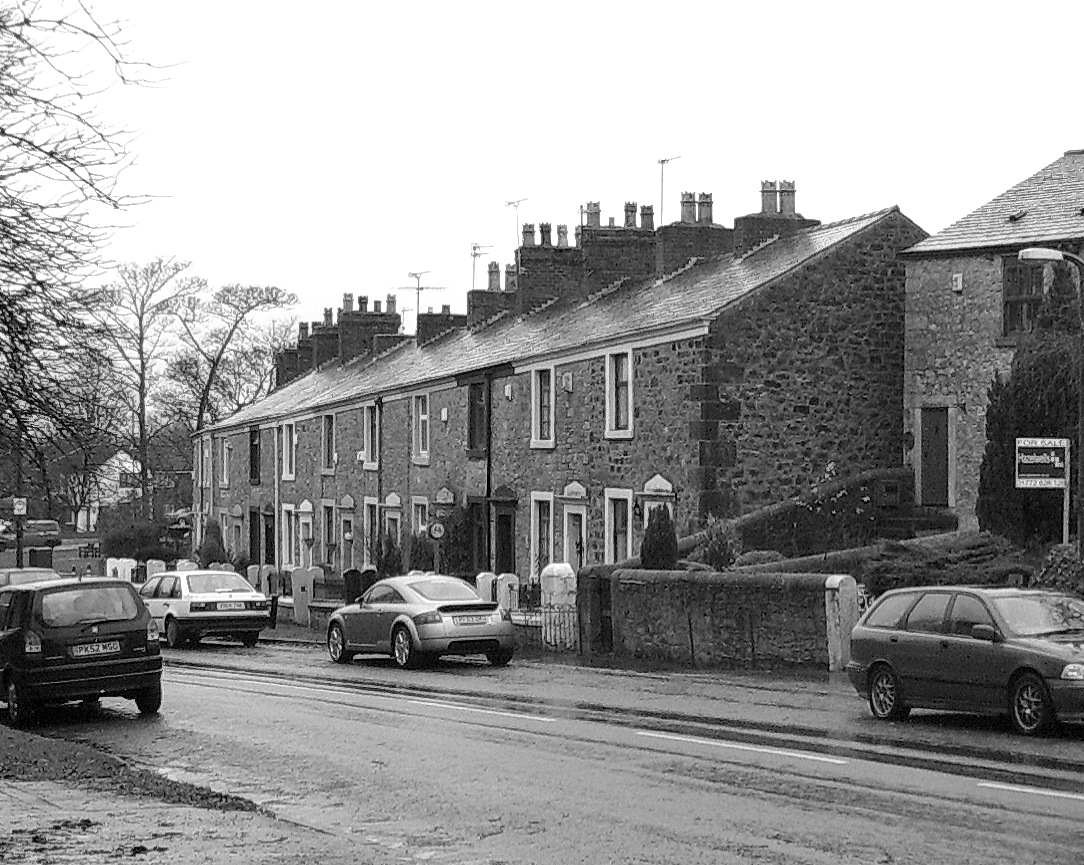
Handloom weavers' cottages, Church Road

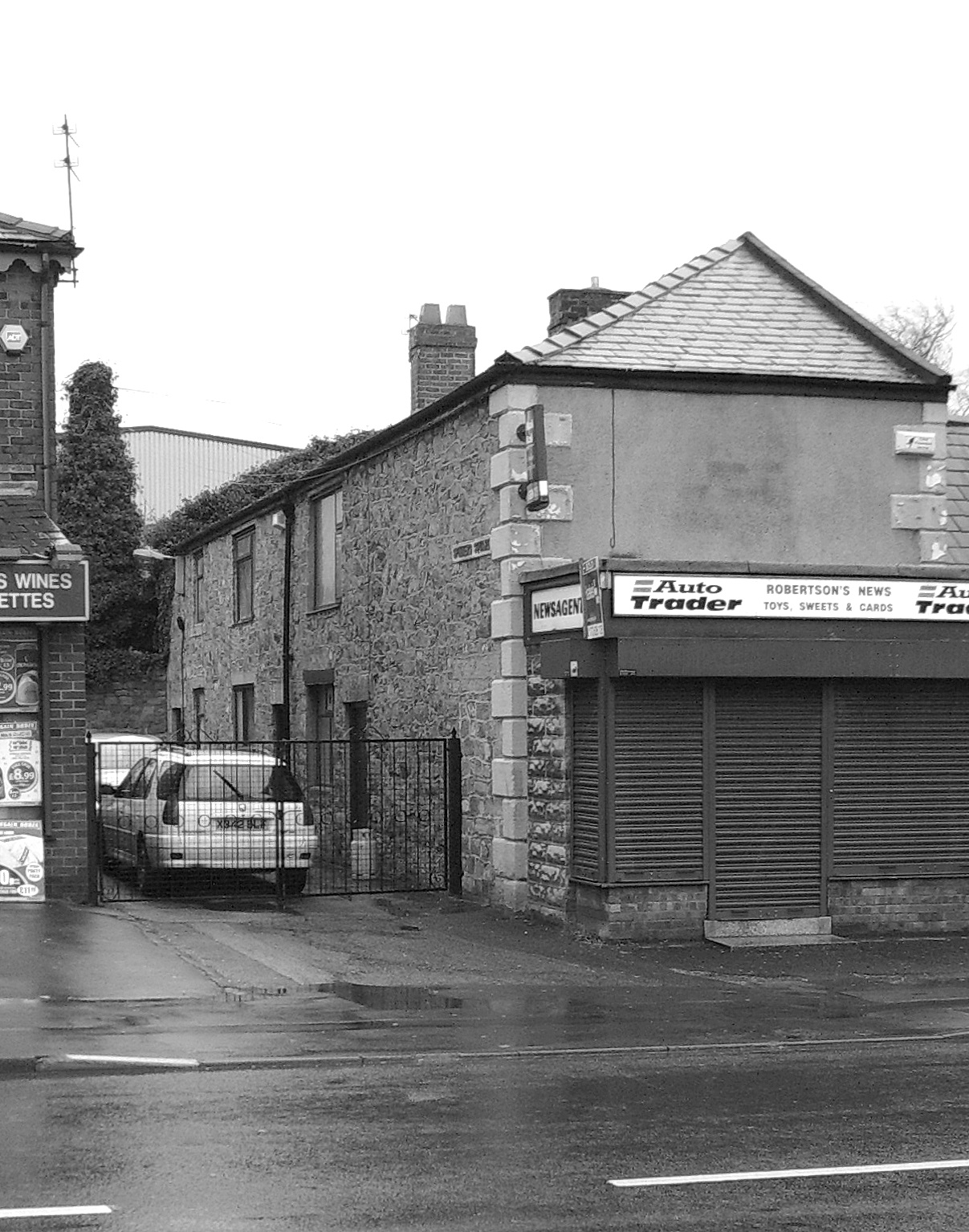
Spinners' cottages, Spinners Square

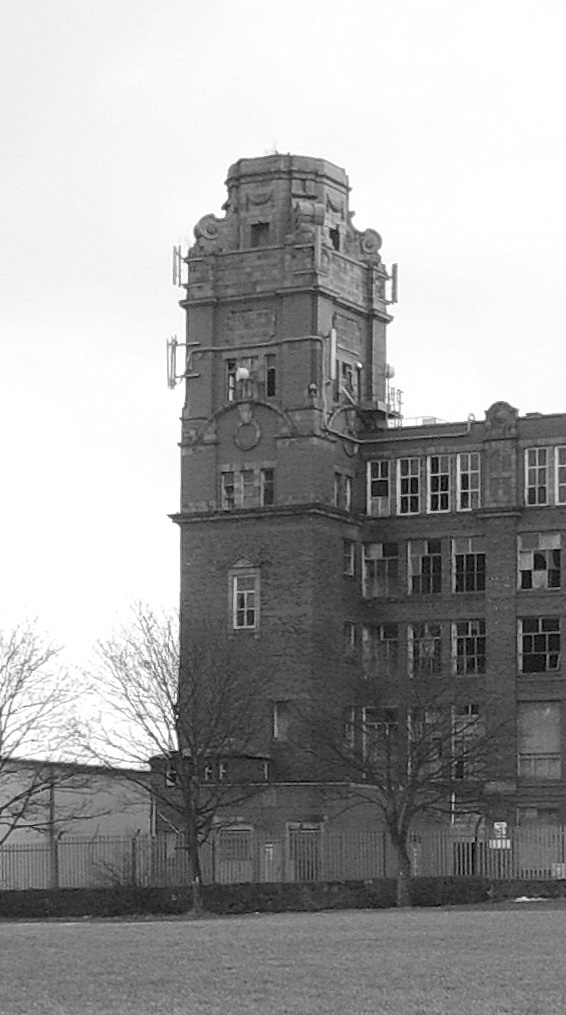
Bamber Bridge Spinning & Weaving Company Mill, Wesley Street, prior to its demolition in 2015

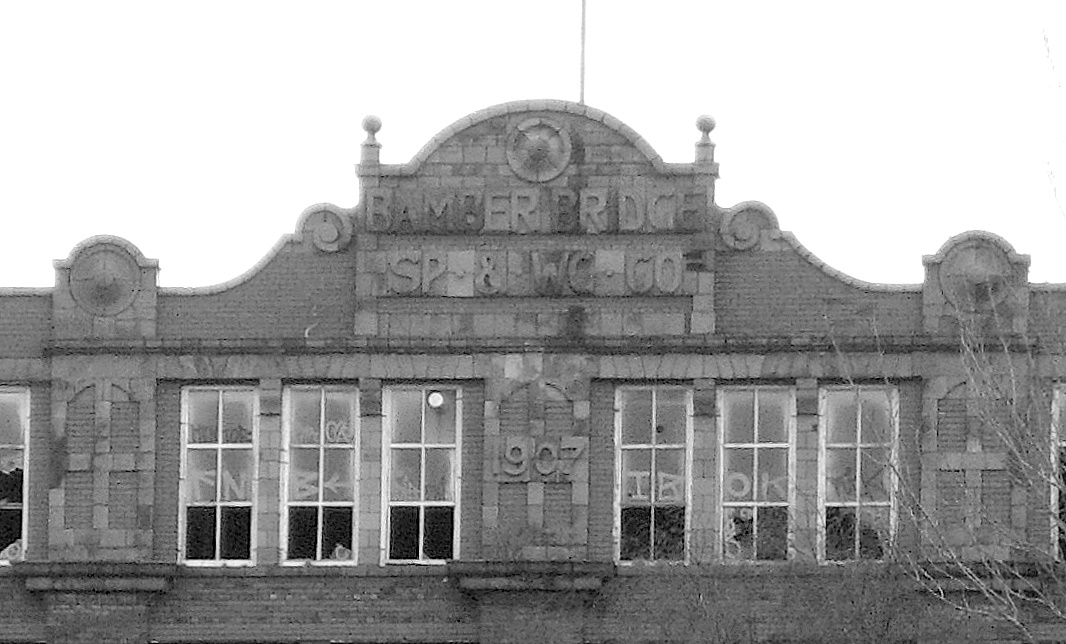
Inscription, Bamber Bridge Spinning & Weaving Company Mill, Wesley Street, prior to its demolition in 2015

== Transport ==
=== Former railways ===
The first railway through Bamber Bridge was the horsedrawn Lancaster Canal Tramroad, which connected two parts of the Lancaster Canal, and crossed Station Road.

The steam-hauled railway came to Bamber Bridge around the same time as the first cotton mills. A line was built connecting Blackburn with the West Coast Main Line at Farington, with a branch connecting Bamber Bridge directly to Preston. Bamber Bridge station was built where the railway crossed Station Road at a level crossing.

The stretch of track through the village was first owned by the East Lancashire Railway, then the Lancashire & Yorkshire Railway following incorporation in 1847.

In March 1859, a Hurricane engine bolted off the rails at Bamber Bridge, ran across the level crossings and caught the end of a house, knocking down the gable end. The accident did not end with any death or injury, even though a woman was washing in the kitchen of the house.

The railway was then amalgamated into the London & North Western Railway in 1922, and twelve months later became part of the London, Midland & Scottish Railway (LMS). The LMS plaque was still in existence on the station subway buildings before their demolition in 2005 due to dilapidation. The railways were nationalised in 1948, becoming part of British Railways. The railways were privatised in the 1990s with Bamber Bridge station having been operated by First North Western, Northern Rail, Arriva Rail North and Northern Trains.

The line from Farington to Blackburn is now part of the East Lancashire Line.

The direct route to Preston was closed by British Rail in the 1970s, and most of the route is now a cycle route, forming part of the National Cycle Network.

=== Roads ===
The B6258 Station Road is the main road through Bamber Bridge, and most of the shops are on this road. It crosses the railway at a level crossing next to the railway station. It was formerly part of the A6, until a bypass was built in the 1980s.

The village is also at the northern end of the A49, where it meets the A6.

The section of the M6 motorway around the village is part of the Preston Bypass opened in 1958, the first motorway in Britain, and includes the junction with the M61 from Manchester. More recently the M65 has been extended to join the A6, also in Bamber Bridge.

=== Train ===
Bamber Bridge railway station has services operated by Northern. The station has hourly direct trains to Preston, Blackburn, Accrington, Burnley and Colne and various railway stations in between.

=== Bus ===
Buses in Bamber Bridge are provided by Preston Bus, Stagecoach Cumbria and North Lancashire, and routes operated on behalf of Lancashire County Council.

== Governance ==
=== Local ===
Bamber Bridge is an unparished area within South Ribble District. Following boundary reforms in 2015 it has been split between two wards on the borough council, both of which are represented by two councillors.

=== County ===
Bamber Bridge is covered by two electoral divisions on Lancashire County Council. The first, Lostock Hall & Bamber Bridge, covers the majority of Bamber Bridge. The second, South Ribble East, covers part of the south and east of Bamber Bridge.

=== Parliamentary ===
Following their review of parliamentary representation in Lancashire, the Boundary Commission for England created a modified Ribble Valley seat and the three Bamber Bridge electoral wards at that time—Bamber Bridge East, Bamber Bridge North and Bamber Bridge West—moved into this constituency at the 2010 UK general election.

Following a further boundary review completed in 2023 the area remained in the Ribble Valley constituency. This means that Bamber Bridge is currently represented in the House of Commons by Maya Ellis, the Labour Party MP for Ribble Valley.

== Demographics ==
Population – the 2021 Census data for the three wards that make up Bamber Bridge listed the entire population as 40,357. Of this number, 20,042 are listed as male and 20,380 as female.

Age – the population was divided into the following age groups; 0–17 years, 19.9%; 18–64 years, 60.5%; and; over 65 years, 19.6%.

Ethnicity – according to census returns, the ethnic make-up of the village was; White, 94.8%; Mixed, 1.8%; Asian or Asian British, 2.2%; Black, Black British, 0.7%, and; other ethnic group, 0.3%.

Religion – the percentage of people listing themselves as; Christian, 63.1%; Buddhist, 0.3%; Hindu, 0.7%; Muslim, 1.3%; Sikh, 0.2%; Other religions, 0.04%; No religion, 34.1%.

== Places of worship ==
Bamber Bridge has two Anglican churches, both are parish churches in the Diocese of Blackburn. The first to be built was St.Saviour's Church in 1837 on land given by R. Townley Parker (Guild mayor of Preston in 1862). The land for the churchyard was donated by R. A. Tatton of Cuerden Hall. It is a Grade II listed building. St. Aidan's Church, on Station Road, was founded in 1895.

The village's Roman Catholic church, St. Mary's Church, was built in 1826, as a replacement for a chapel. A spire was added in 1866, and the church was partly rebuilt by Peter Paul Pugin in 1892. The church has a neo-gothic altar. Bamber Bridge is in the Diocese of Salford.

Bamber Bridge Methodist Church was opened in 2006, as a replacement for an older building on the same site.

Bamber Bridge is also home to Valley Church, a church plant from Fulwood Free Methodist Church.

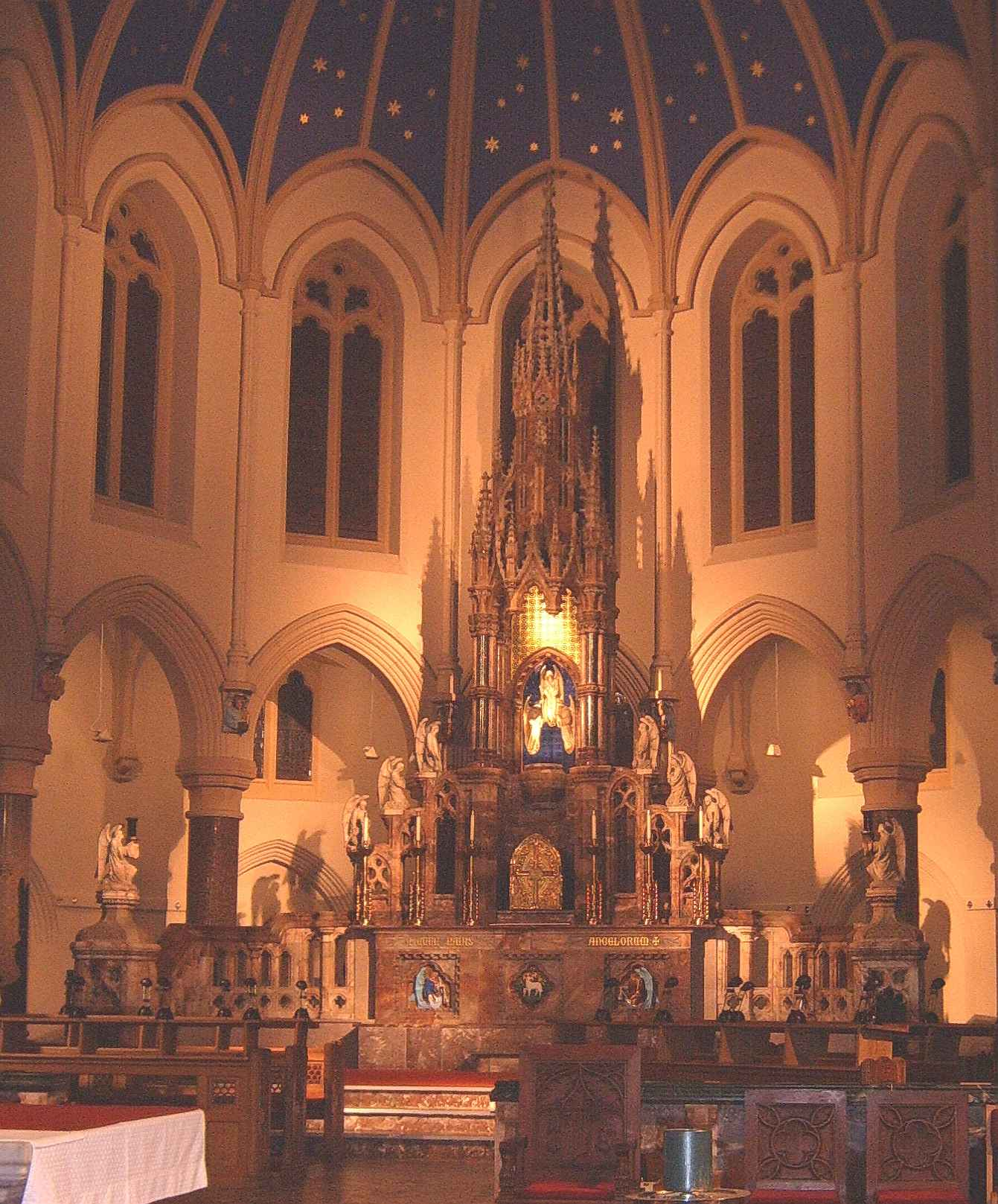
Altar designed by Peter Paul Pugin. Located within Brownedge St. Mary's & St. Benedict's RC Church

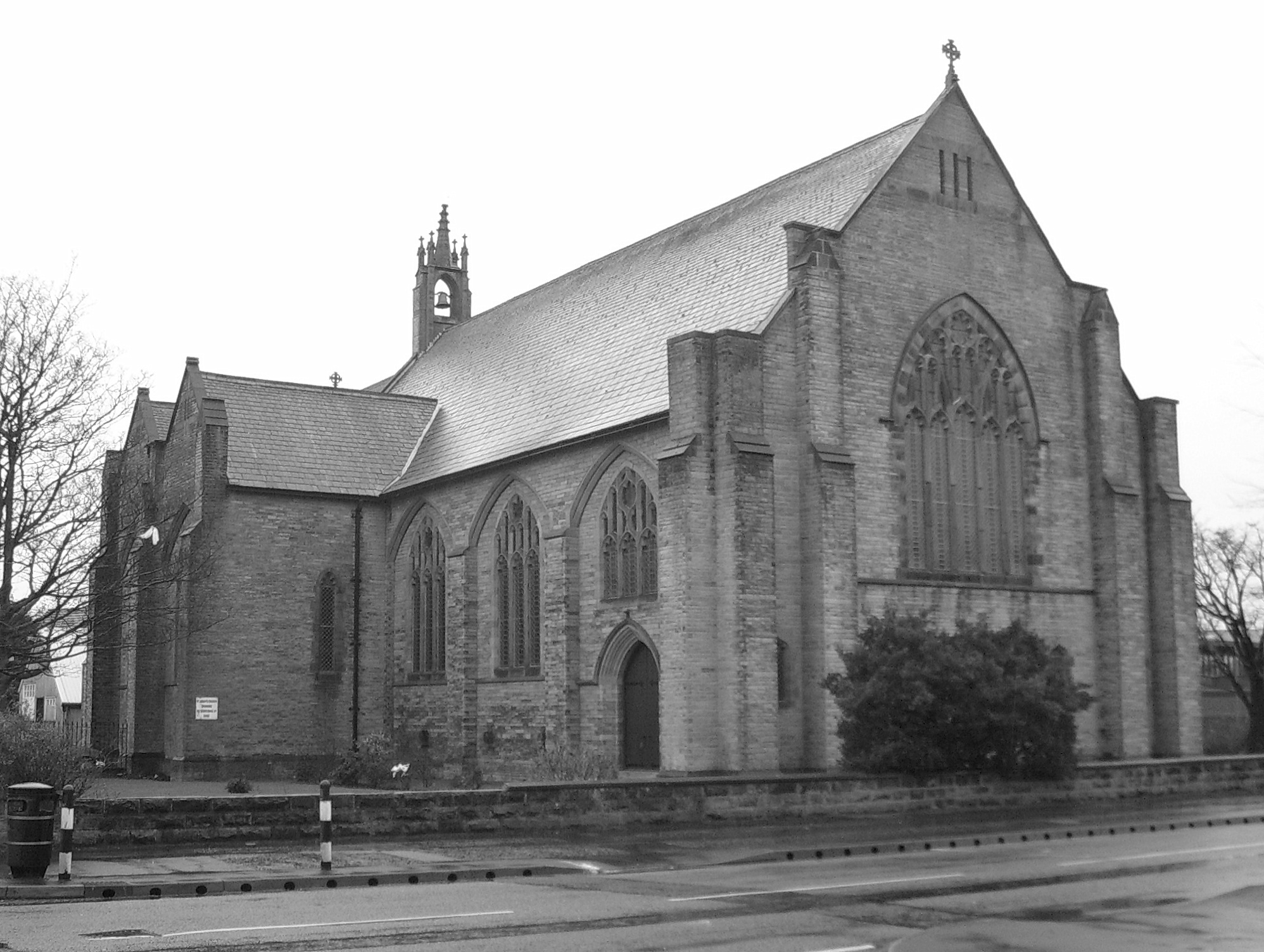
St. Aidan's Anglican Church

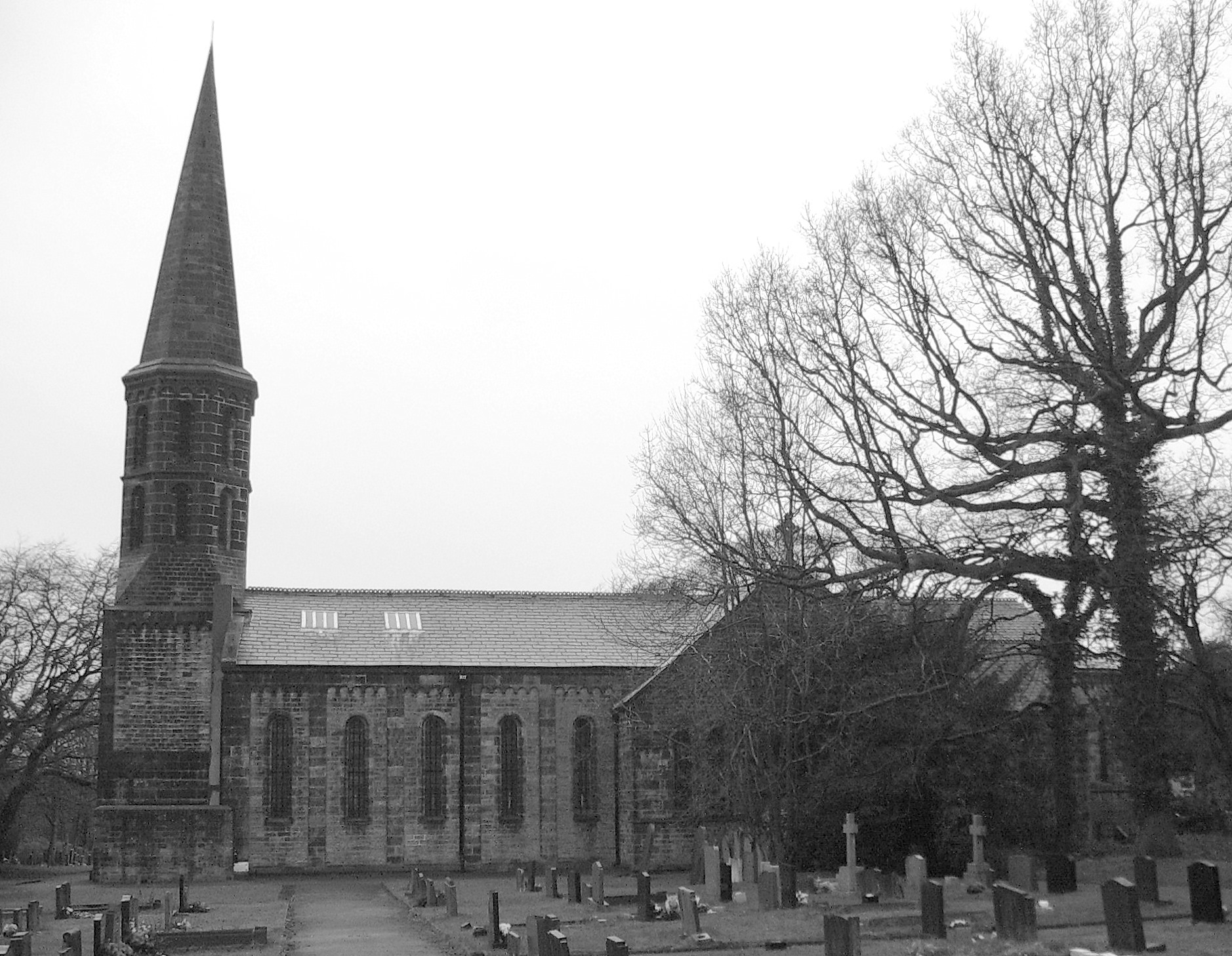
St. Saviour's Anglican Church

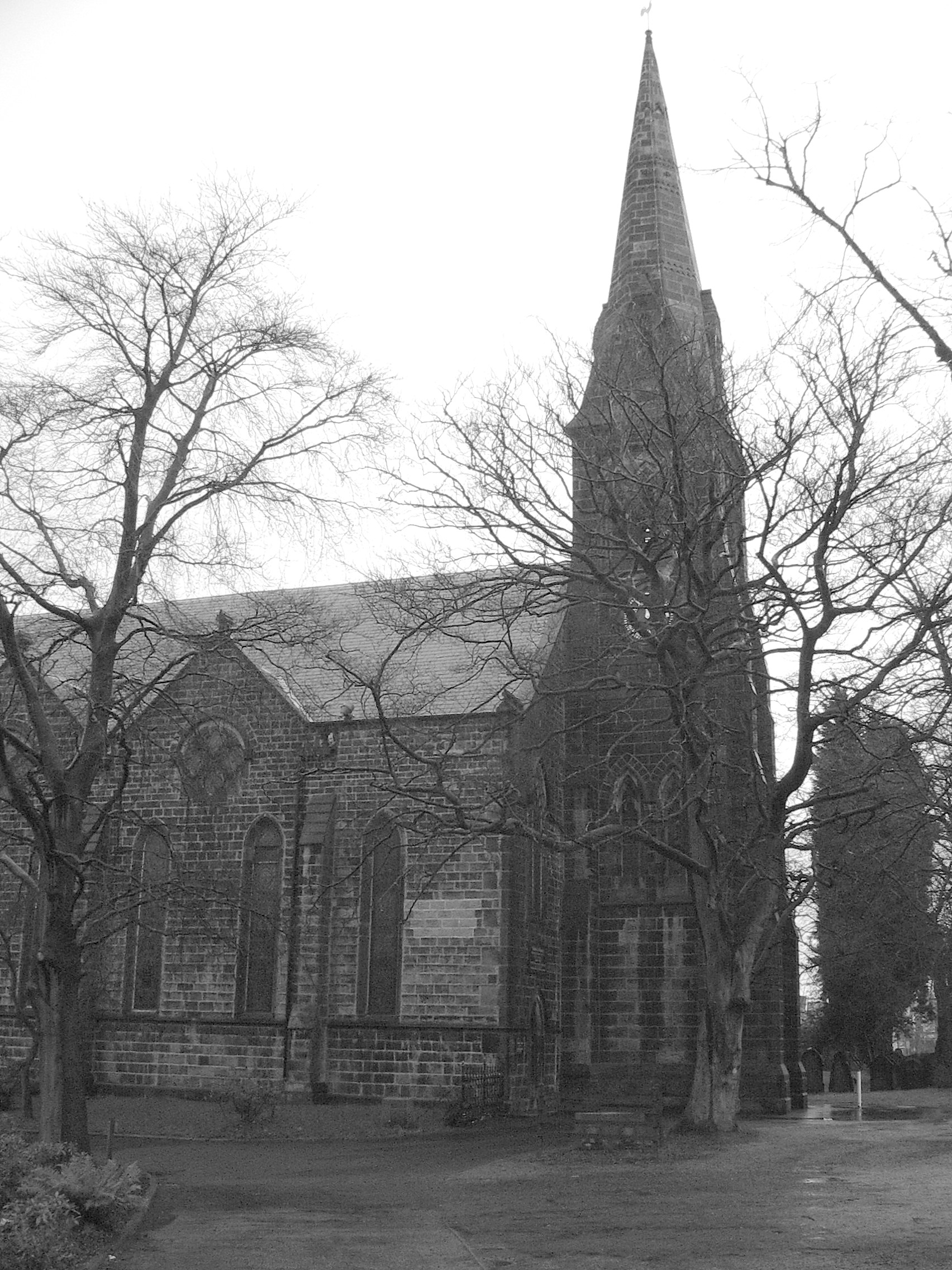
St. Mary's RC Church

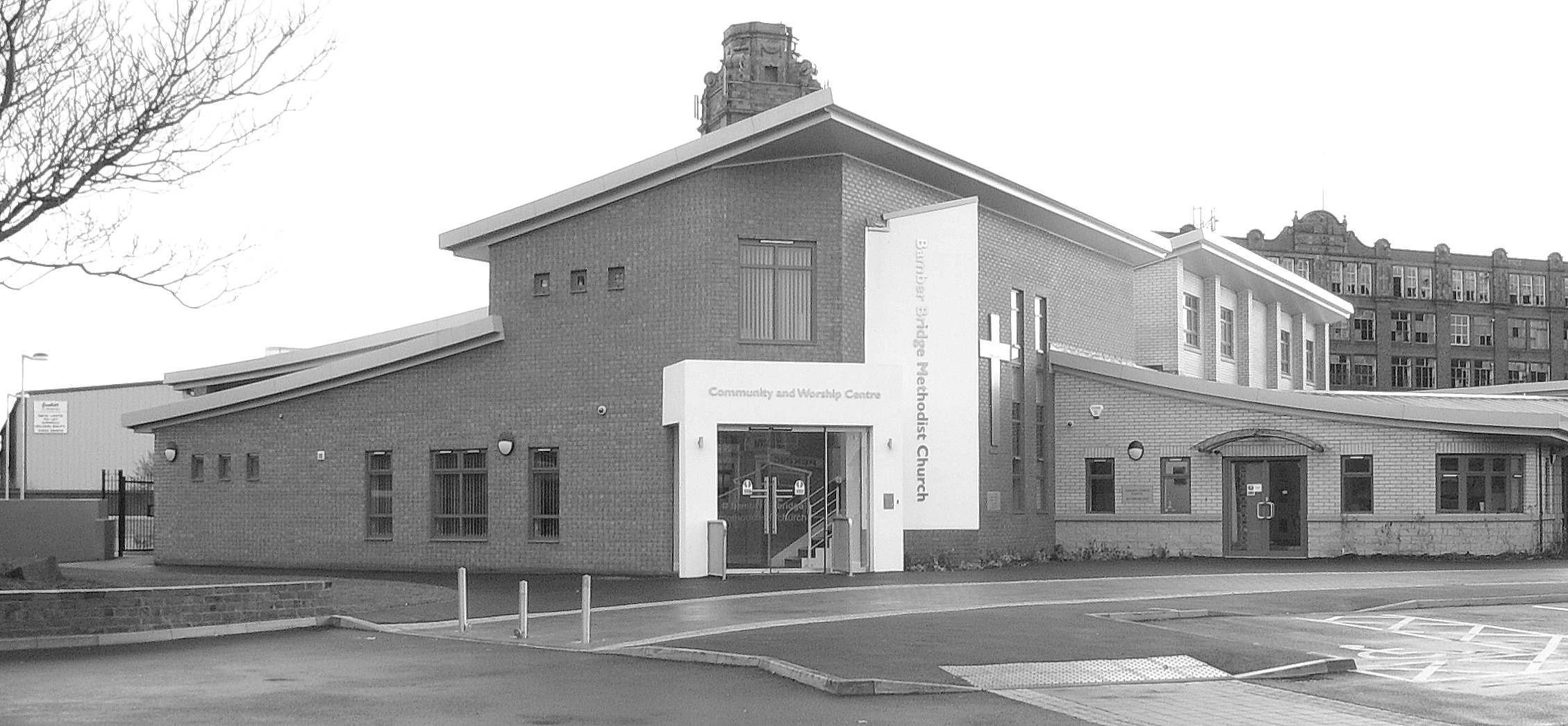
New Methodist Church, completed in 2006

== Notable people ==
- Kevin Brown (born 1950), an English blues musician was born in Bamber Bridge.

== See also ==
- Listed buildings in Walton-le-Dale
