= Walmer Bridge =

Coordinates: 53.713°N 2.790°W

- Village
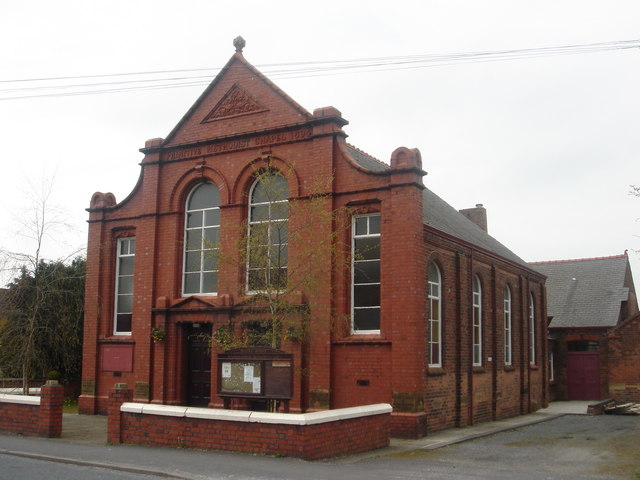
- Methodist Church (demolished in 2011)

- Shown within South Ribble Location within Lancashire
- Population: 2,070 (Little Hoole parish, 2011)
- OS grid reference: SD479242
- Civil parish: Little Hoole
- District: South Ribble
- Shire county: Lancashire
- Region: North West
- Country: England
- Sovereign state: United Kingdom
- Post town: PRESTON
- Postcode district: PR4
- Dialling code: 01772
- Police: Lancashire
- Fire: Lancashire
- Ambulance: North West
- UK Parliament: South Ribble

Walmer Bridge is a small village in Lancashire, England. Surrounding villages are Much Hoole and Longton.

== History ==
Walmer Bridge is first recorded in 1251 in the chartulary of Cockersand Abbey as Waldemurebruge.

Walmer Bridge was once home to a large working mill which was working during the early 1900s. The factory closed in 1931 due to lack of funds. Three decades later, it was controlled demolition, in 1979. It is now the site of a sheltered housing estate called Old Mill Court.

The West Lancashire Railway used to run through some parts of the village. Little Hoole Primary School is situated on Dob Lane, however it used to be located on the corner of School Street where it was opened in the 1930s.

The Wilkins brothers, W & R Wilkins, owners of the malting down Marsh Lane in Longton, originally owned the Walmer Bridge Inn and the Longton Arms. Being a wealthy family, the Wilkins opened the new Methodist chapel in 1894, situated next to the modern day Spar shop. The chapel was knocked down in 2011 in favour of space for new retail outlets.

== Industry ==
The number of local businesses is steadily increasing and the village is home to three hairdressers, two pubs, two convenience stores, a car spares shop, a butchers, a chip shop, an Indian takeaway and two motor vehicle service stations, one of which is also a petrol filling station. The village also boasts a luxury car distributor and a financial advisors as well as several farms. Walmer Bridge also has an ambulance station which serves the local area.

== Village Hall ==
The village hall serves as a community hall. It has had an unfortunate past, including a fire that took place when propane canisters accidentally ignited, causing a lot of damage.

It stands today as a brick building on Gill Lane. The fields at the back of the hall continue on over a small brook (part of the River Douglas) through to Dob Lane.

== See also ==
- Listed buildings in Little Hoole
