= Listed buildings in Farington =

Farington is a civil parish in the South Ribble district of Lancashire, England. It contains seven listed buildings that are recorded in the National Heritage List for England. All of the listed buildings are designated at Grade II, the lowest of the three grades, which is applied to "buildings of national importance and special interest". The parish is largely residential and contains the former villages of Farington and Farington Moss. The listed buildings comprise houses and associated structures, and a church.

== Buildings ==
Name and location	Photograph	Date	Notes
Old School House; 53.71883°N 2.68011°W	—	1673	A pebbledashed brick house with a stone-slate roof. It has two storeys and two bays with an extension at the rear. On the front is a modern flat-roofed extension above which are two three-light casement windows. Also on the front is a datestone with lettering in relief. The right return contains a blocked doorway with a canopy.
Armetridings; 53.70298°N 2.71167°W		1706	A former farmhouse in rendered brick with stone dressings on a plinth, with a roof of blue slate at the front and stone-slate at the rear. There are two storeys with an attic and three bays. On the front is a doorcase with a segmental hood, and at the rear is a two-storey porch with stone quoins. The windows have keystones and contain casements. Inside the house are bressumers.
Gate piers and lodge, Cuerden Hall; 53.72026°N 2.66447°W	—	after 1819	Designed by Lewis Wyatt, the gate piers are tall with demicolumns and rusticated sides, moulded caps, and pedestals, one carrying a hawk and the other a stag, both in stucco. These are flanked by walls with a moulded cornice and a pillar with a ball finial. The lodge, in a square plan, has a single storey, pilasters, and mullioned windows.
Farington Lodge; 53.70640°N 2.68460°W		Early 19th century	A brick house on a stone plinth with stone dressings and a hipped slate roof, later used as a hotel. It has two storeys and a square plan with a symmetrical front of five bays, and with wings at the rear. In the centre is an Ionic porch, behind which is a doorcase with a rectangular fanlight and side windows. The windows are sashes with splayed heads. On the sides are two-storey canted bay windows. Inside the building is elaborate plasterwork.
Lodge to Farington Lodge; 53.70548°N 2.68285°W	—	Early 19th century	The gate lodge is in ashlar and white brick, and has a slate roof. It is in a single storey, and has a T-shaped plan. Facing the drive is a pedimented portico with two Doric columns and a cornice behind which is a doorway with a moulded architrave. On the side walls are pedimented gables, and the windows are sashes.
Farington House; 53.70856°N 2.68415°W		1830s	A house, later used for other purposes, in brick on a stone plinth with stone dressings and a hipped slate roof. It has two storeys and a square plan with five bays on each front, and a service wing at the rear. On the entrance front is a porch with Ionic columns and pilasters and a plain entablature. Above the porch is a three-light window with an architrave, and over this is a pediment containing a carved stag's head. All the windows are sashes.
St Paul's Church; 53.71995°N 2.70122°W		1839–40	The church was designed by Edmund Sharpe and the chancel was added in 1909. It is in brick with stone dressings and a red tile roof. The church consists of a nave and west tower in Romanesque style, and a chancel in Gothic style. The tower has four stages, with angle buttresses rising to form pinnacles. There are Lombard friezes on the tower and along the nave, and both contain round-headed windows.
