= Seema Kennedy =

British Conservative politician (born 1974)

Seema Kennedy OBE
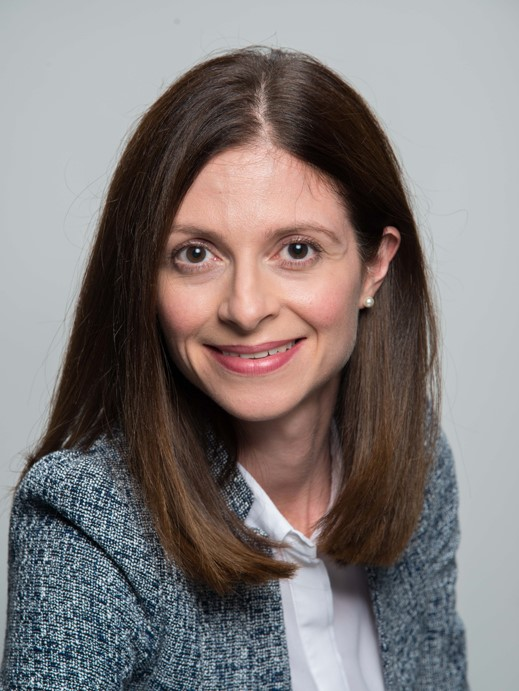
- Official portrait, 2020

Parliamentary Under-Secretary of State for Immigration and Future Borders
- In office 26 July 2019 – 16 December 2019
- Prime Minister: Boris Johnson
- Preceded by: Caroline Nokes
- Succeeded by: Kevin Foster

Parliamentary Under-Secretary of State for Public Health and Primary Care
- In office 4 April 2019 – 26 July 2019
- Prime Minister: Theresa May
- Preceded by: Steve Brine
- Succeeded by: Jo Churchill

Parliamentary Private Secretary to the Prime Minister
- In office 27 June 2017 – 4 April 2019
- Prime Minister: Theresa May
- Preceded by: George Hollingbery
- Succeeded by: Andrew Bowie

Member of Parliament for South Ribble
- In office 7 May 2015 – 6 November 2019
- Preceded by: Lorraine Fullbrook
- Succeeded by: Katherine Fletcher

Personal details
- Born: Seema Louise Ghiassi; 6 October 1974 (age 52) Blackburn, Lancashire, England
- Party: Conservative
- Children: 3
- Education: Pembroke College, Cambridge
- Website: Official website

Seema Louise Ghiassi Kennedy OBE (née Ghiassi, Persian: سیما غیاثی; born 6 October 1974) is a British Conservative Party politician who served as a Parliamentary Under-Secretary of State at both the Department of Health and Social Care and the Home Office in 2019. She was the Member of Parliament (MP) for South Ribble in Lancashire from 2015 to 2019, and also served as the Parliamentary Private Secretary to the Prime Minister from 2017 to 2019. She was the first female MP of Iranian heritage to take a seat in the House of Commons.

Ghiassi attended Westholme School, and studied French and Persian at Pembroke College, Cambridge. She qualified as a commercial property solicitor, and worked for Slaughter and May, and Bevan Brittan, before working for her family's commercial property business Tustin Developments Ltd.

== Early life and legal career ==
Seema Louise Ghiassi was born on 6 October 1974 in Blackburn, Lancashire, England. Her father is an Iranian, and her mother is Irish. Six weeks after her birth, the family moved to Iran. They left the country after the 1979 Iranian Revolution during which her family home and spinning mill business were seized by the new government. They resettled in Blackburn, where Ghiassi attended the private Westholme School. She was head girl at the school.

She studied French and Persian at Pembroke College, Cambridge. During her course, she studied Persian in Paris for a year under the tutelage of Yann Richard. After graduating with a first, Ghiassi completed a law conversion course at the College of Law (now University of Law).

Ghiassi began her legal career at city law firm Slaughter and May, where she trained, and qualified as a commercial property solicitor. She then worked for Bevan Brittan. After having children, she decided to become part-time and left Bevan Brittan to work as a director for her family's commercial property business Tustin Developments Ltd in Lancashire.

== Parliamentary career ==
Kennedy stood as the Conservative Party's candidate in Ashton-under-Lyne at the 2010 general election. She came second in the election to the incumbent Labour MP David Heyes. The constituency is historically a safe Labour seat, having elected an MP from the party since 1935. Kennedy unsuccessfully contested the 2013 Hampstead and Kilburn Conservative primary, and was on the longlist for selection in the Mid Worcestershire constituency. In 2014, Kennedy was elected as councillor for the Marshalwick South ward of St Albans City and District Council. She had previously been the chairwoman of the party in St. Albans but resigned in 2009 after a failed attempt to deselect local MP Anne Main over her parliamentary expenses.

She was elected as Member of Parliament (MP) for South Ribble in the 2015 general election. She is the first MP of Iranian heritage. She was re-elected in the 2017 general election.

She supported the United Kingdom (UK) remaining within the European Union (EU) in the 2016 UK EU membership referendum. Kennedy voted for then Prime Minister Theresa May's Brexit withdrawal agreement in early 2019. In the indicative votes on 27 March, she voted against a referendum on any withdrawal agreement, and against a no-deal Brexit.

Following Theresa May's reshuffle upon becoming prime minister in July 2016, Kennedy was appointed Parliamentary Private Secretary (PPS) to Nick Gibb, the minister of state for schools.

Kennedy was a vice-chairman of the Conservative Middle East Council.

Following the 2017 general election, Kennedy was appointed as the parliamentary private secretary (PPS) to Prime Minister Theresa May. She was the first female PPS to a Conservative prime minister. She served alongside George Hollingbery.

In April 2019, Kennedy was appointed to the position of parliamentary under-secretary of state for public health and primary care. In July 2019, she moved to the Home Office and succeeded Caroline Nokes as the parliamentary under-secretary for immigration. Kennedy was awarded an Order of the British Empire (OBE) in Theresa May's resignation honours in September. She announced on 25 October that she would be standing down as MP at the next general election.

On 18 November 2020, she was appointed as a non-executive director of Ofwat. As of 2022, Kennedy works as a senior adviser for the strategic advisory firm Global Counsel. The company is chaired and was co-founded by former Labour Party politician Peter Mandelson.

== The Jo Cox Loneliness Commission ==
The Jo Cox Commission on Loneliness was launched in January 2017. Kennedy and Labour MP Rachel Reeves were the co-chairwomen of the commission. She had initially began work on the commission with Labour MP Jo Cox in 2016. After Cox's murder, Reeves joined the project to continue her work. In January 2018, the first Minister for Loneliness was appointed in the UK as a result of Kennedy and Reeves' work with the Commission.

== Personal life ==
Kennedy is married to John Clark and has three sons from a previous marriage.

Parliament of the United Kingdom
Preceded by Lorraine Fullbrook	Member of Parliament for South Ribble; 2015–2019	Succeeded by Katherine Fletcher
