= 2013 Hampstead and Kilburn Conservative primary =

Conservative Party (UK) parliamentary primary in Hampstead and Kilburn, 2013
30 January 2013
Candidate
Simon Marcus
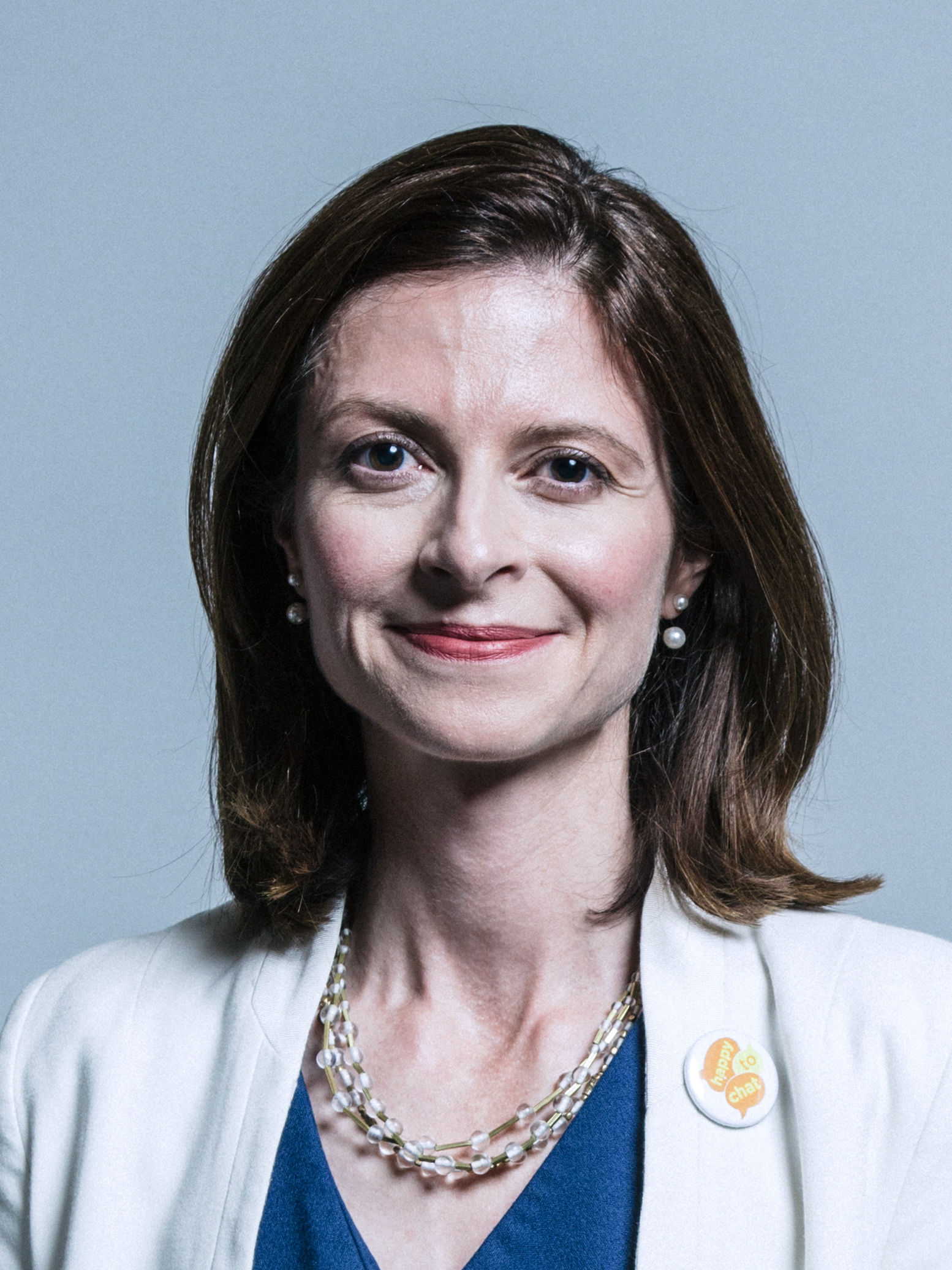
Seema Kennedy
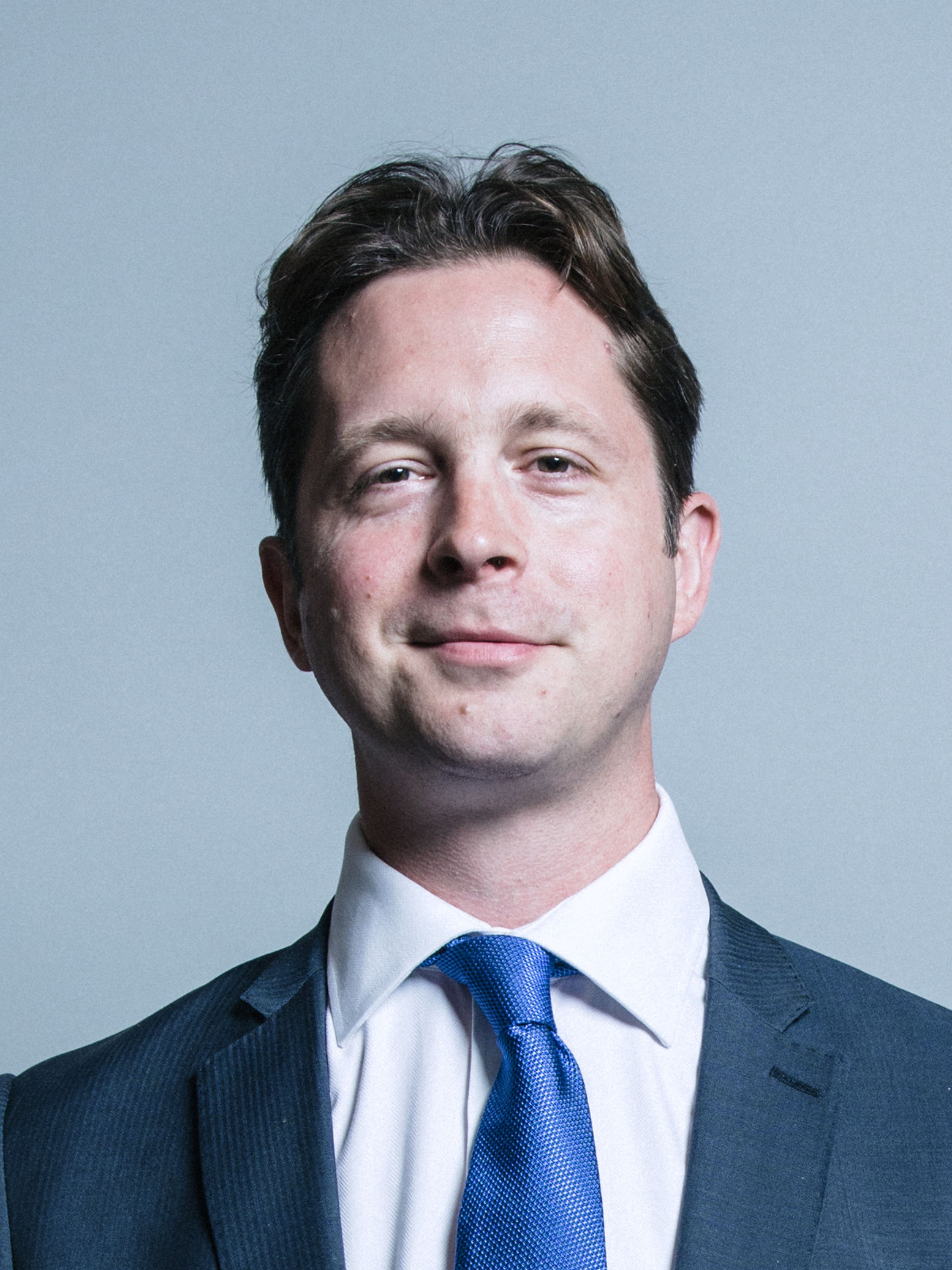
Alex Burghart
Elected Prospective Parliamentary Candidate
Simon Marcus

The Hampstead and Kilburn Conservative Party parliamentary primary of 2013 was the 1st open primary election used to select the Conservative Prospective Parliamentary Candidate for the North London constituency of Hampstead and Kilburn. The election was held on Wednesday 30 January 2013 under the first-past-the-post system. It was the third primary organised by a Conservative Association to select a PPC, after Totnes and Gosport. However, unlike previous primaries, voting took place at a public meeting rather than by postal ballot. At the time, the seat was held by Glenda Jackson, a long serving Labour MP and as due to the close race in 2010, was the Conservatives' number one target seat at the 2015 election.

== Background ==
At the 2010 general election, the incumbent MP Glenda Jackson retained her seat by just 42 votes, the closest margin in England out of all the election results in that election. However, in June 2011, she announced that she would retire from politics, presuming that the Coalition Government survived to 2015.

On 13 December 2012, the Hampstead and Kilburn Conservative Association announced that the selection of the party's Prospective Parliamentary Candidate would be opened up to the public, including those not affiliated with the Conservative Party. The three shortlisted candidates were announced on the same day.

During the campaign, the three candidates met with constituents at stalls to answer questions and raise awareness of the vote.

== Candidates ==
- Alex Burghart, Director of Policy at the Centre for Social Justice. Later became MP for Brentwood and Ongar at the 2017 election.
- Seema Kennedy, the unsuccessful Conservative PCC for Ashton-under-Lyne at the last election. Later became MP for South Ribble at the 2015 election
- Cllr Simon Marcus, a local councillor

== Result ==
At a public meeting held at Hampstead Synagogue, Simon Marcus was selected as the PCC for Hampstead and Kilburn. The local Association estimated that over 200 people attended.

Seema Kennedy went on to be selected to be the candidate in South Ribble in Lancashire. She was elected the MP there holding the seat for the Conservatives. Kennedy served until standing down at the 2019 general election.

Alex Burghart was elected as MP for Brentwood and Ongar at the 2017 general election and since 2021 has served as Parliamentary Under-Secretary of State for Apprenticeships and Skills.

== Aftermath ==
Against the national swing, Labour candidate Tulip Siddiq held the seat at the 2015 general election with a slightly increased majority.

General election 2015: Hampstead and Kilburn
Party	Candidate	Votes	%	±%
Labour	Tulip Siddiq	23,977	44.4	+11.6
Conservative	Simon Marcus	22,839	42.3	+9.6
Liberal Democrats	Maajid Nawaz	3,039	5.6	−25.6
Green	Rebecca Johnson	2,387	4.4	+3.0
UKIP	Magnus Nielsen	1,532	2.8	+2.1
Independent	The Eurovisionary Carroll (deceased)*	113	0.2	N/A
U Party	Robin Ellison	77	0.1	N/A
Majority		1,138	2.1	+2.0
Turnout		53,964	67.3	+1.0
Registered electors		80,195		
Labour hold		Swing	+1.0	

== See also ==
- Conservative Party (UK) parliamentary primaries, 2009
