= Listed buildings in Little Hoole =

Little Hoole is a civil parish in the South Ribble district of Lancashire, England. It contains two listed buildings that are recorded in the National Heritage List for England. Both of the listed buildings are designated at Grade II, the lowest of the three grades, which is applied to "buildings of national importance and special interest". The parish contains the village of Walmer Bridge, and is otherwise rural, The listed buildings comprise a former manor house and a farmhouse, both dating from the 17th century.

== Buildings ==
Name and location	Photograph	Date	Notes
Banks Farmhouse; 53.70766°N 2.78078°W	—	Early 17th century (probable)	The farmhouse is in pebbledashed brick on a rendered stone plinth, and has a slate roof. It has two storeys and three bays, the first bay being gabled. The porch has a round-headed opening, and all the windows have been altered. Inside the farmhouse is a full cruck truss, an inglenook, and a bressumer.
Manor House; 53.71075°N 2.81352°W	—	1691	A brick house with some quoins and a stone-slate roof. It has two storeys and a three-bay front, the third bay being a cross wing. A shooting lodge was added to the rear in the 19th century. In the north front is a two-storey gabled porch that has a blocked doorway with an inscribed lintel, and on this front are sliding sash windows. On the west front there is a central doorway and casement windows with segmental heads. Inside, is an inglenook with a large bressumer.
