= Hoole railway station =

Former railway station in England

Hoole
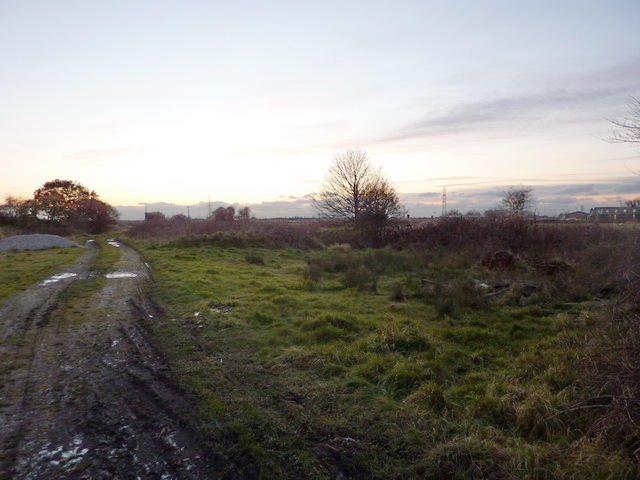
- Site of the former station in 2012

General information
- Location: South Ribble; England
- Coordinates: 53.7099°N 2.8082°W
- Grid reference: SD468240
- Platforms: 2

Other information
- Status: Disused

History
- Original company: West Lancashire Railway
- Pre-grouping: Lancashire and Yorkshire Railway
- Post-grouping: London, Midland and Scottish Railway

Key dates
- 18 May 1882: Opened
- 6 April 1964: Closed to goods
- 7 September 1964: Closed to passengers
Location

Hoole railway station was on the West Lancashire Railway in England. It was in the civil parish of Little Hoole about a mile from the village of Much Hoole. It opened in 1882 and closed in 1964.

== History ==
The station opened as Hoole on 18 May 1882 when the West Lancashire Railway (WLR) extended its line northwards from River Douglas to Longton.

=== Location ===
The station was located where Marsh House Lane (now Station Road) crossed the line using a level crossing.

There were two platforms, one each side of the double-track line, the Southport bound platform had a brick-built booking office and waiting room and the Preston bound platform a brick shelter.

There was a goods siding to the eastern side of the line, behind the Southport bound platform.

=== Closure ===
The station closed to goods traffic on 6 April 1964 and to passengers on 7 September 1964 when the line closed. The station closed when the line ceased operations on 7 September 1964.

Preceding station	Disused railways	Following station
River Douglas towards Southport	West Lancashire Railway	Longton Bridge towards Preston

== Bibliography ==
- Clinker, C. R. (October 1978). Clinker's Register of Closed Passenger Stations and Goods Depots in England, Scotland and Wales 1830–1977. Bristol: Avon-Anglia Publications & Services. ISBN 0-905466-19-5. OCLC 5726624.
- Hindle, David John (2022). Lament for a Branch Line: The Preston to Southport Railway (2nd Enlarged ed.). Silver Link Books. ISBN 978 1 85794 609 3.
- Hurst, Geoffrey (1992). Register of Closed Railways: 1948-1991. Worksop, Nottinghamshire: Milepost Publications. ISBN 0-9477-9618-5.
- Quick, Michael (2023) [2001]. Railway passenger stations in Great Britain: a chronology (PDF). version 5.05. Railway & Canal Historical Society.
