= Katherine Fletcher =

British Conservative politician

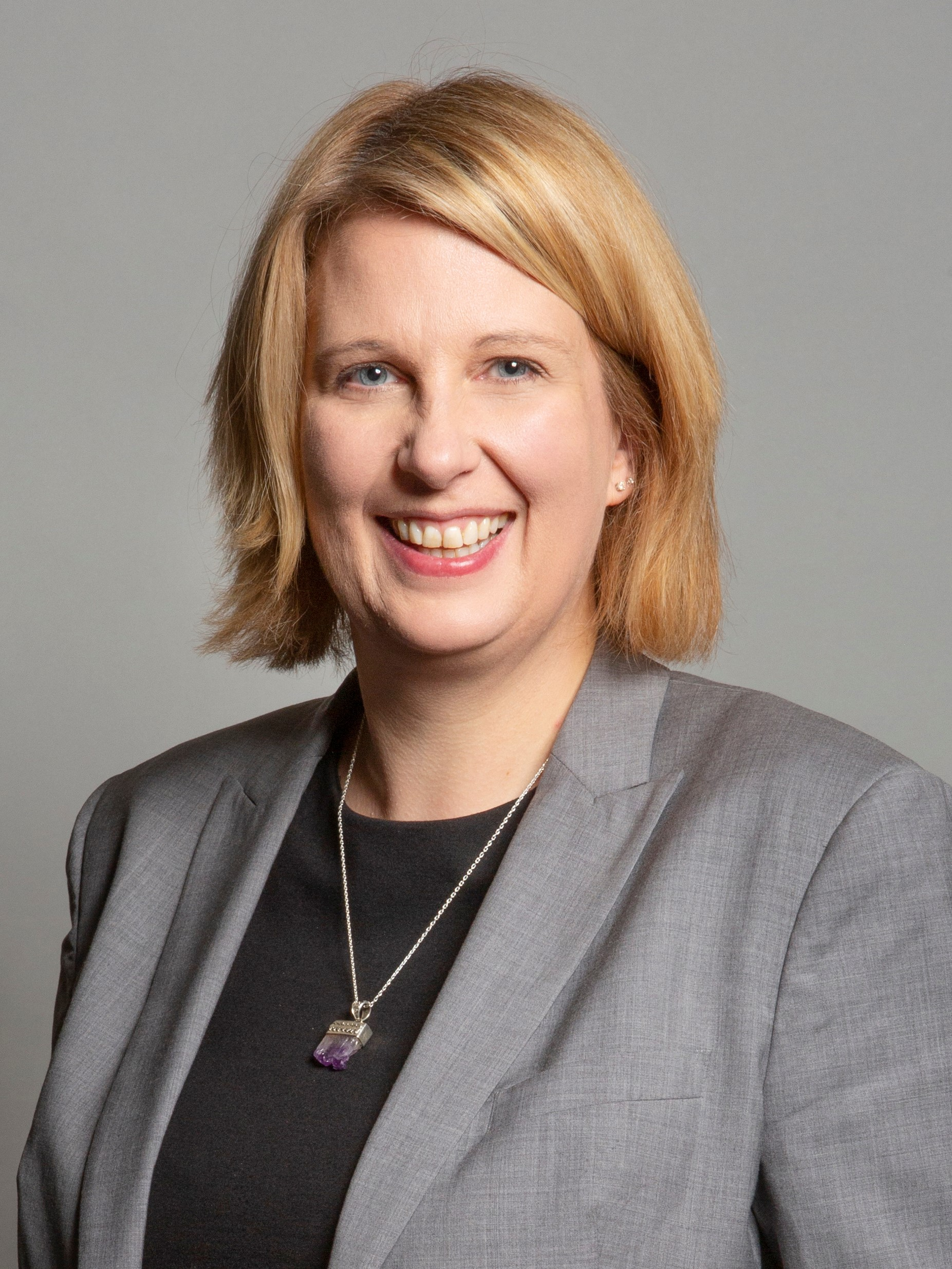
- Official portrait, 2019

Parliamentary Under-Secretary of State for Women
- In office 20 September 2022 – 27 October 2022
- Prime Minister: Liz Truss
- Preceded by: The Baroness Stedman-Scott
- Succeeded by: Maria Caulfield

Parliamentary Under-Secretary of State for Transport
- In office 20 September 2022 – 27 October 2022
- Prime Minister: Liz Truss
- Preceded by: Karl McCartney
- Succeeded by: Richard Holden

Member of Parliament for South Ribble
- In office 12 December 2019 – 30 May 2024
- Preceded by: Seema Kennedy
- Succeeded by: Paul Foster

Personal details
- Born: Katherine Fletcher; 18 February 1976 (age 50) Wythenshawe, Manchester, England
- Party: Conservative
- Education: University of Nottingham

Katherine Fletcher (born 18 February 1976) is a British Conservative Party politician who served as the Member of Parliament (MP) for South Ribble in Lancashire, from 2019 to 2024. She served as Parliamentary Under-Secretary of State in the Department for Transport and Minister for Women between September and October 2022.

== Early life and career ==
Katherine Fletcher was born on 18 February 1976 in Wythenshawe, living in Brooklands until she went to university in Nottingham.

Fletcher attended, St Wilfreds Junior School, Sandilands Junior School in Wythenshawe and then the selective Altrincham Grammar School for Girls in Bowdon, Greater Manchester. She studied biology at University of Nottingham, during which time she worked as a nursing assistant in an elderly care home. Before her election, Fletcher worked in banking and assisted in the early setup of the Northern Powerhouse. At the time of the election, Fletcher was a small and medium enterprise (SME) business owner and a town councillor on Knutsford Town Council. Fletcher resigned from the Town Council in April 2020.

== Parliamentary career ==
Fletcher stood as the Conservative Party's candidate in Ellesmere Port and Neston at the 2015 general election. She came second in the election to the Labour MP Justin Madders. She was elected as Member of Parliament (MP) for South Ribble at the 2019 general election. Her predecessor was fellow Conservative Seema Kennedy, who retired. Fletcher advocated for the A&E department at the Chorley and South Ribble Hospital to be restored to a 24-hour service.

Fletcher held Membership of two Parliamentary Committees: the Science and Technology Select Committee and the Petitions Committee.

Fletcher lost her South Ribble seat at the 2024 General Election to the Labour party's Paul Foster with a 17.4 swing to the Labour Party.

== Post-parliamentary career ==
Following her defeat at the 2024 general election, Fletcher has worked as a freelance property developer.

== Personal life ==
Fletcher qualified as safari ranger (field guide) during a gap year in Mpumalanga in Limpopo province, South Africa, and Mozambique. Away from politics, she enjoys palaeontology and holds a season ticket at Manchester United.

Parliament of the United Kingdom
Preceded by Seema Kennedy	Member of Parliament for South Ribble; 2019–2024	Succeeded by Paul Foster
