= Little Hoole =

Civil parish in Lancashire, England

Coordinates: 53.704723°N 2.797982°W

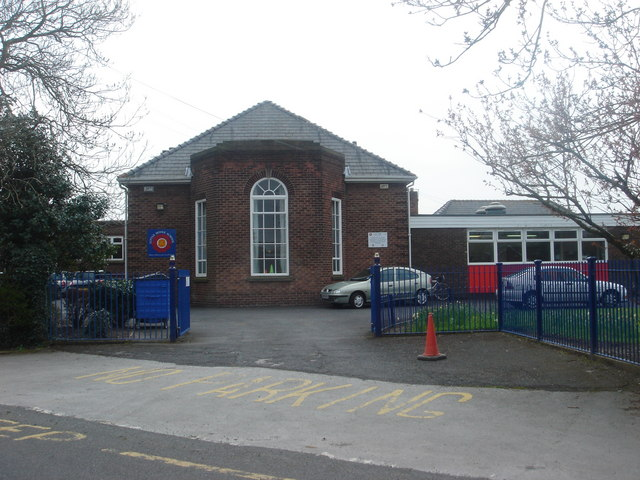
- Little Hoole County Primary School

- Shown within South Ribble Location within Lancashire
- Population: 2,070
- OS grid reference: SD4742023440
- Civil parish: Little Hoole
- District: South Ribble
- Shire county: Lancashire
- Region: North West
- Country: England
- Sovereign state: United Kingdom
- Post town: PRESTON
- Postcode district: PR4
- Dialling code: 01772
- Police: Lancashire
- Fire: Lancashire
- Ambulance: North West
- UK Parliament: South Ribble

Little Hoole is a civil parish in Lancashire, England, It contains the village of Walmer Bridge, and the remaining part is predominantly a farming community. Other nearby villages include Much Hoole and Longton. The parish had a population of 1,815 people in 2001, increasing to 2,070 at the 2011 Census.

== Geography ==
Little Hoole is near an inlet brook running to the River Douglas. The A59 from Ormskirk to Preston crosses the township from south to north.

== History ==
The parish was part of Preston Rural District throughout its existence from 1894 to 1974. In 1974 the parish became part of South Ribble.

Hoole railway station was in the parish, but closed in 1964.

== Community ==
Locals typically frequent the nearby pubs: the Walmer Bridge Inn, the Fox Cub, and the Longton Arms.

== Wind Farm planning application ==
In May 2011, a planning application was submitted to South Ribble Borough Council to erect 4 wind turbines on moss land to the East of the village. Local response to the application has been mixed with strong support both supporting and objection to the development; with objections mainly focusing on the development being on green belt land. The applicant withdrew the application in December 2011 pending further studies.

== See also ==
- Listed buildings in Little Hoole
