= 2023 South Ribble Borough Council election =

Local election in England

- 4 May 2023

All 50 seats on South Ribble Borough Council 26 seats needed for a majority

	First party	Second party	Third party
Leader	Paul Foster	Karen Walton	Angela Turner
Party	Labour	Conservative	Liberal Democrats
Last election	22 seats, 30.8%	23 seats, 42.8%	5 seats, 14.6%
Seats before	24	21	5
Seats after	29	16	5
Seat change	▲7	▼7	Steady
Percentage	42.6%	36.9%	19.0%
- Results by ward. Conservative shown in blue, Labour in red, and Lib Dem in orange.
Leader before election
Paul Foster
Labour
No overall control
Leader after election
Paul Foster
Labour

Local elections were held for South Ribble Borough Council on 4 May 2023. These took place on the same day as the wider local elections across England.

Every multi-member ward was up for election.

== Pre-election composition ==
Party	Seats
Conservatives	21
Labour	24
Liberal Democrats	5

Although the Conservatives won the most seats and votes at the election in 2019, Labour and the Liberal Democrats formed a coalition to govern the council, led by Labour councillor Paul Foster. In addition, since the 2019 election, two Conservatives had crossed the floor to Labour, making it the largest party in the run up to the 2023 elections.

The election saw Labour take a majority of the seats on the council, giving it overall control.

== Results summary ==
2023 South Ribble Borough Council election
Party	This election			Full council			This election		
Party	Seats	Net	Seats %	Other	Total	Total %	Votes	Votes %	+/−
Labour	29	▲7	58.0	0	29	58.0	24,784	42.6	▲8.1
Conservative	16	▼7	31.0	0	16	31.0	21,465	36.9	▼8.5
Liberal Democrats	5	Steady	10.0	0	5	10.0	11,058	19.0	▲2.7
Green	0	Steady	0.0	0	0	0.0	605	1.04	New
Alliance for Democracy & Freedom	0	Steady	0.0	0	0	0.0	233	0.40	New

No candidates from the UK Independence Party stood in this election, unlike previous years.

== Ward results ==
=== Bamber Bridge East ===
Bamber Bridge East
Party	Candidate	Votes	%	±%
Labour	Patricia Hunter	618	72.5	+19.5
Labour	Emma Stevens	486	57.0	+11.6
Conservative	Lesley Thurlbourn	189	22.2	−11.7
Conservative	Stephen Thurlbourn	173	20.3	−9.8
Green	Rachel Knowles	131	15.4	N/A
Majority		853	23.4	
Turnout				
Labour hold		Swing		
Labour hold		Swing		

=== Bamber Bridge West ===
Bamber Bridge West
Party	Candidate	Votes	%	±%
Labour	Paul Foster	490	67.5	+4.3
Labour	Caleb Tomlinson	442	60.9	+6.0
Conservative	Paul Watson	248	34.2	−1.1
Conservative	Susan Marsh	221	30.4	−3.5
Majority		726	23.8	
Turnout				
Labour hold		Swing		
Labour hold		Swing		

=== Broadfield ===
Broadfield
Party	Candidate	Votes	%	±%
Labour Co-op	Matthew Tomlinson	624	77.7	+2.6
Labour Co-op	Kath Unsworth	581	72.4	−5.1
Conservative	Peter Tinsley	147	18.3	+1.4
Conservative	Charles Hamman	140	17.4	+1.0
Liberal Democrats	Mary Young	72	9.0	N/A
Majority		803	22.4	
Turnout				
Labour Co-op hold		Swing		
Labour Co-op hold		Swing		

=== Broad Oak ===
Broad Oak
Party	Candidate	Votes	%	±%
Liberal Democrats	Harold Hancock	951	70.3	+3.5
Liberal Democrats	Ange Turner	948	70.1	+9.9
Labour	Andy Rae	251	18.6	+3.2
Conservative	Simon Casey	250	18.5	−5.5
Conservative	Anne Mather	188	13.9	−9.9
Majority		1,353	39.3	
Turnout				
Liberal Democrats hold		Swing		
Liberal Democrats hold		Swing		

=== Buckshaw & Worden ===
Buckshaw & Worden
Party	Candidate	Votes	%	±%
Labour	Pete Pillinger	682	49.6	+15.8
Labour	Wes Roberts	620	45.1	+12.7
Conservative	Andrew Ashton	612	44.5	−19.5
Conservative	Susan Snape	555	40.3	−21.0
Liberal Democrats	Stephen McHugh	159	11.6	N/A
Majority		1,376	36.9	
Turnout				
Labour gain from Conservative		Swing		
Labour gain from Conservative		Swing		

=== Charnock ===
Charnock
Party	Candidate	Votes	%	±%
Labour	Deborah Ashton	556	57.6	+11.1
Labour	Ian Watkinson	523	54.1	+6.2
Conservative	Joan Burrows	344	35.6	−6.8
Conservative	George Ashcroft	339	35.1	−5.2
Liberal Democrats	Gillian Bennett	63	6.5	−3.4
Liberal Democrats	Adrian Bennett	49	5.1	N/A
Majority		966	34.5	
Turnout				
Labour hold		Swing		
Labour hold		Swing		

=== Coupe Green & Gregson Lane ===
Coupe Green & Gregson Lane
Party	Candidate	Votes	%	±%
Conservative	Mathew Forshaw	580	46.5	−5.1
Labour	James Gleeson	571	45.8	+12.7
Conservative	Gareth Watson	512	41.0	−8.3
Labour	Geoff Key	462	37.0	+7.6
Alliance for Democracy & Freedom	Carly Davis	125	10.0	N/A
Liberal Democrats	Paul Valentine	120	9.6	N/A
Majority		1,248	33.7	
Turnout				
Conservative hold		Swing		
Labour gain from Conservative		Swing		

=== Earnshaw Bridge ===
Earnshaw Bridge
Party	Candidate	Votes	%	±%
Labour	Lou Jackson	549	53.1	+9.9
Labour	Colin Sharples	546	52.9	+11.6
Conservative	Peter Aspinall	334	32.3	−7.7
Conservative	Mick Lennon	314	30.4	−9.0
Liberal Democrats	Alastair Thomas	94	9.1	−2.5
Alliance for Democracy & Freedom	Joan Wright	62	6.0	N/A
Majority		1,033	29.3	
Turnout				
Labour hold		Swing		
Labour hold		Swing		

=== Farington East ===
Farington East
Party	Candidate	Votes	%	±%
Labour	Paul Wharton-Hardman (Note: was elected as a Conservative in 2019 but left the party and sat as an independent before later joining Labour)	608	64.2	+12.1
Labour	Jacky Alty	549	58.0	+21.1
Conservative	Basil Howard	287	30.3	−21.8
Conservative	James Collier	254	26.8	−9.2
Liberal Democrats	Katherine Hesketh	91	9.6	−6.0
Majority		947	26.2	
Turnout				
Labour hold		Swing		
Labour gain from Conservative		Swing		

=== Farington West ===
Farington West
Party	Candidate	Votes	%	±%
Conservative	Karen Walton	491	50.4	
Conservative	George Rear	433	44.5	
Labour	Angie Williams	411	42.2	
Labour	Chris Wharton-Hardman	407	41.8	
Liberal Democrats	Alan Swindells	146	15.0	
Majority		974	28.0	
Turnout				
Conservative hold		Swing		
Conservative hold		Swing		

=== Hoole ===
Hoole
Party	Candidate	Votes	%	±%
Conservative	John Rainsbury	566	51.6	−3.5
Conservative	Connor Watson	466	42.5	−20.1
Labour	David Suthers	404	36.8	+10.3
Labour	Mike Webster	389	35.5	N/A
Liberal Democrats	Graham Smith	168	15.3	+2.6
Liberal Democrats	Geoffrey Crewe	97	8.8	N/A
Majority		1,097	32.8	
Turnout				
Conservative hold		Swing		
Conservative hold		Swing		

=== Howick & Priory ===
Howick & Priory
Party	Candidate	Votes	%	±%
Liberal Democrats	David Howarth	1,627	74.9	+14.6
Liberal Democrats	James Lillis	1,436	66.1	+15.3
Liberal Democrats	David Shaw	1,390	64.0	+17.9
Labour	David Bennett	480	22.1	+4.6
Conservative	Suzanne Buttery	319	14.7	−4.7
Conservative	Linda Woollard	303	14.0	−8.4
Conservative	Alistair Woollard	287	13.2	−7.6
Green	Heike McMurray	200	9.2	N/A
Majority		2,172	39.7	
Turnout				
Liberal Democrats hold		Swing		
Liberal Democrats hold		Swing		
Liberal Democrats hold		Swing		

=== Leyland Central ===
Leyland Central
Party	Candidate	Votes	%	±%
Labour	Aniela Bylinski-Gelder	666	64.7	+15.4
Labour	Haydn Williams	662	64.3	+17.5
Conservative	Robert Newsome	262	25.4	−9.6
Conservative	Elizabeth Watson	211	20.5	−16.5
Liberal Democrats	Helen Crewe	130	12.6	+0.5
Majority		1,030	29.1	
Turnout				
Labour hold		Swing		
Labour hold		Swing		

=== Longton & Hutton West ===
Longton & Hutton West
Party	Candidate	Votes	%	±%
Conservative	Julie Buttery	965	59.8	+4.8
Conservative	Colin Coulton	934	57.8	+1.7
Conservative	Will King	892	55.2	+1.5
Labour	Adam Godwin	422	26.1	+7.0
Liberal Democrats	Simon Carter	371	23.0	+5.4
Liberal Democrats	Nicholas Monks	302	18.7	N/A
Liberal Democrats	Christopher Maloney	266	16.5	+0.7
Green	Emma Winterleigh	261	16.2	N/A
Majority		1,615	35.3	
Turnout				
Conservative hold		Swing		
Conservative hold		Swing		
Conservative hold		Swing		

=== Lostock Hall ===
Lostock Hall
Party	Candidate	Votes	%	±%
Labour	Lesley Pritchard	930	56.7	+14.4
Labour	Peter Gabbott	886	54.0	+14.4
Labour	Elaine Stringfellow	828	50.5	+11.3
Conservative	Stephen Bridge	661	40.3	−5.4
Conservative	David Moore	577	35.2	−9.9
Conservative	Tony Green	564	34.4	−6.9
Liberal Democrats	Elizabeth Basquill	97	5.9	−4.4
Liberal Democrats	Peter Hubberstey	82	5.0	−4.1
Liberal Democrats	Martin Cassell	72	4.4	−4.0
Majority		1,640	32.7	
Turnout				
Labour hold		Swing		
Labour gain from Conservative		Swing		
Labour gain from Conservative		Swing		

=== Middleforth ===
Middleforth
Party	Candidate	Votes	%	±%
Labour	Will Adams	957	57.3	+10.6
Labour	Keith Martin	940	56.3	+7.0
Labour	James Flannery	913	54.6	+6.9
Conservative	Frances Walker	418	25.0	−11.6
Conservative	David Micallef	401	24.0	−14.2
Conservative	Moses Nutekpor	360	21.5	−16.3
Liberal Democrats	Clare Burton-Johnson	271	16.2	N/A
Liberal Democrats	Marion Hancock	259	15.5	−0.7
Liberal Democrats	Chris Burton-Johnson	235	14.1	N/A
Majority		1,671	29.8	
Turnout				
Labour hold		Swing		
Labour hold		Swing		
Labour hold		Swing		

=== Moss Side ===
Moss Side
Party	Candidate	Votes	%	±%
Conservative	Mary Green	595	50.1	+7.4
Conservative	Michael Green	590	49.7	+5.7
Labour	Sophie Wilding	554	46.6	+20.1
Labour	Mal Donoghue	518	43.6	N/A
Majority		1,188	37.9	
Turnout				
Conservative hold		Swing		
Conservative hold		Swing		

=== New Longton & Hutton East ===
New Longton & Hutton East
Party	Candidate	Votes	%	±%
Conservative	Margaret Smith	753	53.0	−10.9
Conservative	Phil Smith	729	51.3	−10.0
Liberal Democrats	David Moore	666	46.8	+29.6
Liberal Democrats	Tim Young	618	43.5	+29.4
Majority		1,422	38.0	
Turnout				
Conservative hold		Swing		
Conservative hold		Swing		

=== Samlesbury & Walton ===
Samlesbury & Walton
Party	Candidate	Votes	%	±%
Conservative	Peter Mullineaux	606	57.4	
Conservative	Anjisu Gleave	596	56.5	
Labour	Elaine Hughes	346	32.8	
Labour	Stephen Bennett	344	32.6	
Liberal Democrats	Christopher Mortimer	106	10.0	
Majority		1,055	32.8	
Turnout				
Conservative hold		Swing		
Conservative hold		Swing		

=== Seven Stars ===
Seven Stars
Party	Candidate	Votes	%	±%
Labour	Jane Bell	627	66.9	+6.2
Labour	Matthew Farnworth	604	64.5	+13.2
Conservative	Josh Seed	257	27.4	−12.2
Conservative	Daniel Southern	244	26.0	−7.8
Liberal Democrats	Alexander Howarth	69	7.4	N/A
Majority		937	27.8	
Turnout				
Labour hold		Swing		
Labour hold		Swing		

=== St Ambrose ===
St Ambrose
Party	Candidate	Votes	%	±%
Labour	Nicky Peet	692	68.2	+3.9
Labour	Jo Hindle-Taylor	671	66.1	+7.0
Conservative	David Hambley	222	21.9	−1.1
Conservative	David Caunce	218	21.5	+3.0
Liberal Democrats	Simon Thomson	102	10.0	−7.8
Alliance for Democracy & Freedom	Michael Gibbons	46	4.5	N/A
Majority		1,015	32.7	
Turnout				
Labour hold		Swing		
Labour hold		Swing		

=== Walton-le-Dale East ===
Walton-le-Dale East
Party	Candidate	Votes	%	±%
Labour	Chris Lomax	708	63.4	+15.0
Labour	Hilary Bedford	698	62.5	+17.9
Conservative	Carol Chisholm	391	35.0	−15.2
Conservative	Samuel Mason	302	27.1	−20.2
Majority		1,116	32.5	
Turnout				
Labour hold		Swing		
Labour gain from Conservative		Swing		

=== Walton-le-Dale West ===
Walton-le-Dale West
Party	Candidate	Votes	%	±%
Conservative	Damian Bretherton	617	50.2	+0.3
Conservative	Matt Campbell	548	44.6	+4.1
Labour	Richard Burton	426	34.7	N/A
Labour	Alex Watson	394	32.1	+2.6
Green	Charles Parkinson	116	9.4	N/A
Green	Sue Broady	97	7.9	N/A
Majority		1,229	37.1	
Turnout				
Conservative hold		Swing		
Conservative hold		Swing		

== Changes 2023–2027 ==
- Matthew Forshaw, elected as a Conservative, left the party in February 2024 to sit as an independent.

=== By-elections ===
==== Bamber Bridge West ====
Bamber Bridge West: 10 October 2024
Party	Candidate	Votes	%	±%
Labour	David Bollenberg	253	44.8	–21.6
Conservative	Stephen Bridge	186	32.9	–0.7
Liberal Democrats	Paul Valentine	126	22.3	N/A
Majority		67	11.9	N/A
Turnout		569	18.2	–5.6
Registered electors		3,131		
Labour hold		Swing	▼10.5	

==== Middleforth ====
Middleforth by-election: 24 October 2024
Party	Candidate	Votes	%	±%
Conservative	Joan Burrows	517	46.3	+20.9
Labour	Laura Crawford-Lane	362	32.4	–25.7
Liberal Democrats	Clare Burton-Johnson	173	15.5	–1.0
Green	Ann Moorby	64	5.7	N/A
Majority		155	13.9	N/A
Turnout		1,120	19.6	–10.2
Registered electors		5,705		
Conservative gain from Labour		Swing	▲23.3	

==== Broad Oak ====
Broad Oak by-election: 18 December 2025
Party	Candidate	Votes	%	±%
Liberal Democrats	Clare Burton-Johnson	810	65.9	−4.4
Reform	Lee James Forshaw	263	21.4	N/A
Conservative	Gareth Paul Watson	95	7.7	−10.8
Labour	Andy Rae	62	5	−13.6
Majority		547	44.5	+5.2
Turnout		1,230	35.3	
Liberal Democrats hold		Swing		

The by-election was caused by the death of Liberal Democrat councillor Harry Hancock.
