= Farington =

Village in Lancashire, England

Coordinates: 53.703°N 2.685°W

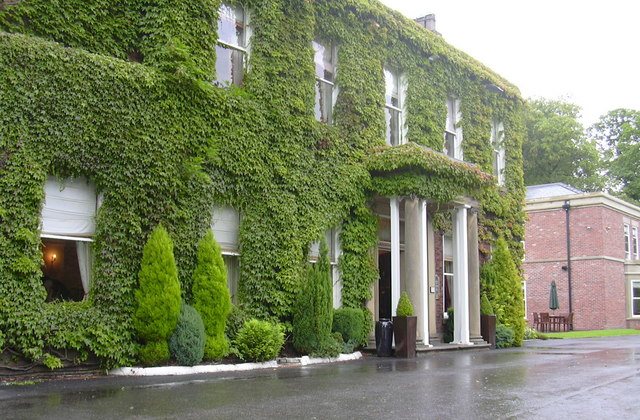
- Farington Lodge Hotel

- Shown within South Ribble Location within Lancashire
- Population: 7,868 (2021)
- OS grid reference: SD548232
- Civil parish: Farington
- District: South Ribble
- Shire county: Lancashire
- Region: North West
- Country: England
- Sovereign state: United Kingdom
- Post town: LEYLAND
- Postcode district: PR25, PR26
- Dialling code: 01772
- Police: Lancashire
- Fire: Lancashire
- Ambulance: North West
- UK Parliament: South Ribble

Farington is a village and civil parish in the South Ribble local government district of Lancashire, England. The population of the civil parish at the 2021 Census was 7,868.

== History ==
The parish was part of Preston Rural District throughout its existence from 1894 to 1974. In 1974 the parish became part of South Ribble.

Farington railway station served the area from 1838 to 1960.

== Governance ==
Farington is a civil parish in South Ribble district; with Lostock Hall and Tardy Gate and Farington Moss it forms the district's Central Villages area chaired by Cllr Paul Wharton-Hardman BEM (July 2023). It was also within the Parliamentary Constituency of South Ribble until the 2010 general election. However, at the recommendation of the Boundary Commission, the area was moved into the Ribble Valley constituency, but will be returning to South Ribble under new boundary changes in 2023. The parish includes the villages of Farington and Farington Moss, and parts of Lostock Hall and Whitestake.

Farington Parish has four South Ribble Councillors; Cllr George Rear and Cllr Karen Walton representing Farington West ward both elected as Conservative members, and Cllr Paul Wharton-Hardman BEM and Cllr Jacky Alty representing Farington East ward elected Labour members.

Lancashire County Council's Farington electoral division is represented by Michael Green, a Conservative Councillor. It comprises both Farington wards and Moss Side.

== Geography ==
Situated to the immediate north of Leyland, Farington consists of villages, farms and mossland, modern residential development and an industrial area around the Leyland Trucks headquarters and assembly plant.

The relationship between Farington and Leyland has always been strong but Farington is not part of Leyland. Stanifield Lane which runs through the village and into Leyland is the main thoroughfare for shoppers and commuters alike. There is a Catholic convent in Farington, serving a moderately large Catholic population. Farington has a park that has been referred to as the home of football in South Ribble.

It is home to the main tip site for South Ribble, the Farington Household Waste Recycling Centre.

== Economy ==
Leyland Trucks, with HQ and assembly plant in Farington, is a major employer in the area. The Central Lancashire Primary Care Trust has its head office in the area. Enterprise plc, a provider of support services to the public sector and utility companies, was based in Farington but has been integrated into Amey plc, which moved from its offices there when the lease expired in 2014 There are few retail facilities in the centre of Farington, but retail parks and Leyland town centre are nearby.

Farington Cricket Ground, the secondary home of Lancashire County Cricket Club, opened in 2026.

== See also ==
- Listed buildings in Farington
