= Outcast (magazine) =

Defunct British Magazine

- October 2001 cover
- Founder: Chris Morris
- First issue: 1999
- Final issue: October 2001
- Country: United Kingdom
- Language: English

Outcast was a controversial "queer" magazine in the United Kingdom. It was launched as a non-profitmaking project by Chris Morris in 1999.

Contributors included Mayor Ken Livingstone, Liberal Democrat leader Charles Kennedy, Foreign Office minister Ben Bradshaw, Mark Simpson, John Hein, David Borrow and Peter Tatchell amongst many others.

== Taking on the gay establishment ==
The magazine lampooned the '"softly softly" approach of Stonewall and ran a series of exposés about the business dealings of London Mardi Gras (formerly Gay Pride).

In June 2000, it ran its most controversial article, accusing the owners of a rival magazine, The Pink Paper, of running a corrupt HIV charity.

It told the story of how David Bridle and Kelvin Sollis set up Positive Lives "to educate and support gay men living with HIV". Their stated aims were to run a helpline, produce information videos, provide housing and promote safer sex. In reality, Outcast claimed the charity had "done no charitable work whatsoever" and alleged that all the money raised by the charity had "mysteriously disappeared".

Bridle and Sollis threatened to sue the magazine, its printer, its website host and others. Libel expert David Price acted for Outcast pro bono and successfully defended the magazine from all claims.

The Charity Commission investigated the allegations made in the article and concluded:

- The Commission found little evidence that any charitable activity had ever been undertaken by Positive Lives.
- The accounts produced for Positive Lives did not show a true and fair view of the charity's activities.
- The charity's accounts suggest that The Pink Paper donated 55,300 GBP to the charity but the reality is that little or no money changed hands.
- The Commission found that the trustees of Positive Lives failed in even the most basic duties that would be expected of them.

Positive Lives was shut down by the commission. Bridle and Sollis sold The Pink Paper shortly after.

== Other notable stories ==
In November 1999, Outcast published an article by Paul Kirwan about Post-exposure prophylaxis (PEP) entitled "The Secret HIV Drugs". It condemned the government for offering PEP treatments to doctors and nurses exposed to HIV by needle accidents but not to rape victims or people who had unprotected sex. The article led to a Channel Four documentary. The Terrence Higgins Trust runs adverts that encourage people to ask about PEP in these circumstances and the Department of Health has changed its guidelines as a result.

The magazine published a series of articles by openly gay foreign office minister Ben Bradshaw and his former advisor Philip Taylor, who believed the Labour government was not doing enough for gay rights. Entitled "Conversations", the two discussed gay rights from their different perspectives – inside and outside the government.

Activists in Zimbabwe, Gibraltar, United States and Iran shared stories about conditions around the world.

After the settlement of a libel case brought by Laurence Godfrey, the magazine's website was shut down by its host Netbenefit in April 2000.

== Campaigns ==
Outcast was the first gay magazine to get a press pass to the British House of Commons and, in its typical irreverent style, it used the opportunity to have a "queer picnic" in the press lobby and interview MPs on their views about gay rights.

It also organised debates, including the first gay rights meeting at Eton College. It sponsored community projects such as the Equality Alliance and produced a free newsletter, Queer Update, for activists.

It was instrumental in organising opposition to the commercialisation of London Mardi Gras.

== Closure in 2001 ==
Outcast published its last edition in October 2001, just 26 months after it was launched. In a closing statement on the magazine's website, Chris Morris wrote:

Our articles poked fun at respected people, challenged long-established ideas and disproved widely-accepted 'facts' - not because these points were especially important in themselves but because they got people to think about queer things in new ways. Ideas come and go, but our beliefs about the bigger picture will always affect how we respond to new ideas in the future. I think Stonewall will be a very different organisation in a couple of years, I think the gay press will be different and I think London Mardi Gras will be a thing of the past. None of that will be down to Outcast directly, but we've done our bit. We've contributed to the debate, and the debate goes on.

== Note ==
Outcast Magazine should not be confused with The Outcast magazine, a magazine that was established in 1998 and is dedicated to singlespeed mountain biking. Though the magazines shared the same name, and the mountain bike magazine appeared first, the editor of The Outcast, Chipps Chippendale sent a letter of camaraderie to Outcast Magazine reflecting his view that both were suitably anti-establishment and anti-stereotype that they complemented each other. The Outcast is still in print.
