= St Paul's Church, Farington =

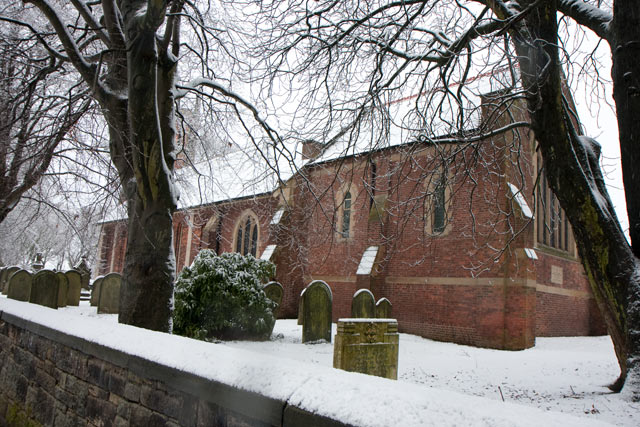
- St Paul's Church, Farington, from the southeast

- Location in the Borough of South Ribble
- 53.7199°N 2.7012°W
- OS grid reference: SD 538,250
- Location: Farington Moss, Lancashire
- Country: England
- Denomination: Anglican
- Website: St Paul, Farington

History
- Status: Parish church
- Dedication: St Paul
- Consecrated: 27 June 1849

Architecture
- Functional status: Active
- Heritage designation: Grade II
- Designated: 11 November 1966
- Architect(s): Edmund Sharpe; J. A. Seward
- Architectural type: Church
- Style: Romanesque, Gothic Revival
- Groundbreaking: 1839
- Completed: 1910
- Construction cost: £1,700 (equivalent to £150,000 in 2025)

Administration
- Province: York
- Diocese: Blackburn
- Archdeaconry: Blackburn
- Deanery: Leyland
- Parish: Farington Moss, St Paul

Clergy
- Vicar: Rev Hannah Boyd

St Paul's Church is in the village of Farington Moss, Lancashire, England. It is an active Anglican parish church in the deanery of Leyland, the archdeaconry of Blackburn and the diocese of Blackburn. Its benefice is united with that of St James, Lostock Hall. The church is recorded in the National Heritage List for England as a designated Grade II listed building. It was a Commissioners' church, having received a grant towards its construction from the Church Building Commission.

== History ==
St Paul's was built in 1839–40 and designed by the Lancaster architect Edmund Sharpe. The church cost £1,700 (equivalent to £150,000 in 2025) to build and £500 of this was met by a grant from the Church Building Commission. The church was consecrated on 27 June 1849 by Rt Revd John Bird Sumner who was at that time the Bishop of Chester. When first built it had seating for 479 people. In 1909 it was enlarged by adding an extra bay to the nave and increasing the size of the chancel, the architect being J. A. Seward of Preston. The addition had resulted in a higher roof for the chancel, and in 1966 the nave roof was raised to the same level as the chancel.

== Architecture ==
The church is built in brick with stone dressings and a red tile roof. The tower and nave are in Romanesque style and the chancel is in Gothic Revival style. Its plan consists of a six-bay nave, a chancel, and a northwest tower. The tower has four stages, with angle buttresses rising to a pinnacle at each corner. In the bottom stage are arched doorways; above this each stage contains a pair of round-headed windows. The windows in the first floor are glazed; those above are louvred.

== External features ==
The churchyard contains war graves of four soldiers of World War I, and a soldier, a marine and Royal Navy sailor of World War II.

== See also ==
- Listed buildings in Farington
- List of architectural works by Edmund Sharpe
- List of Commissioners' churches in Northeast and Northwest England
