= Conservative Party (UK) parliamentary primaries =

Since 2009, the Conservative Party in the United Kingdom has experimented with the use of open primaries to select some parliamentary candidates.

The first primaries were held ahead of the 2010 general election. More than a dozen primaries were held ahead of the 2015 general election.

== Selection committee ==
The members of the selection committee are as follows:

Ben Elliot	Chairman of the Board and co-chairman of the Conservative Party
Rt Hon James Cleverly MP	Co-chairman of the Conservative Party and deputy chairman of the Board
Andrew Sharpe OBE	Chairman of the National Conservative Convention and deputy chairman of the Board
Udi Sheleg	Treasurer of the Conservative Party
Pamela Hall	President of the National Conservative Convention
James Pearson	Vice President of the National Conservative Convention
Andrew Colborne-Baber	Vice President of the National Conservative Convention
Peter Booth	Vice President of the National Conservative Convention
Alan Mabbutt OBE	Senior member of the professional staff of the Party
Cllr Mark Hawthorne MBE	Chairman of the Conservative Councillors' Association
Robert Forman MBE WS	Chairman, Scottish Conservative & Unionist Party
Byron Davies	Chairman, Welsh Conservatives
Anthea McIntyre MEP	Appointed by the Leader pursuant to Rule 12.10
The Baroness Sater	Appointed by the Board pursuant to Rule 12.12
Rt Hon Lord Hunt of Wirral MBE	Chairman, Association of Conservative Peers
Sir Graham Brady MP	Chairman, 1922 Committee
Charles Walker OBE MP	Elected by the 1922 Committee
Rt Hon Dame Cheryl Gillan DBE MP	Elected by the 1922 Committee
Sir Geoffrey Clifton-Brown MP	Elected by the 1922 Committee
Stephen Phillips OBE	Secretary to the Board

== 2010 general election ==
Primaries were held in a few seats, including Oxford West and Abingdon, Totnes, Gosport and Bracknell.

=== Totnes ===
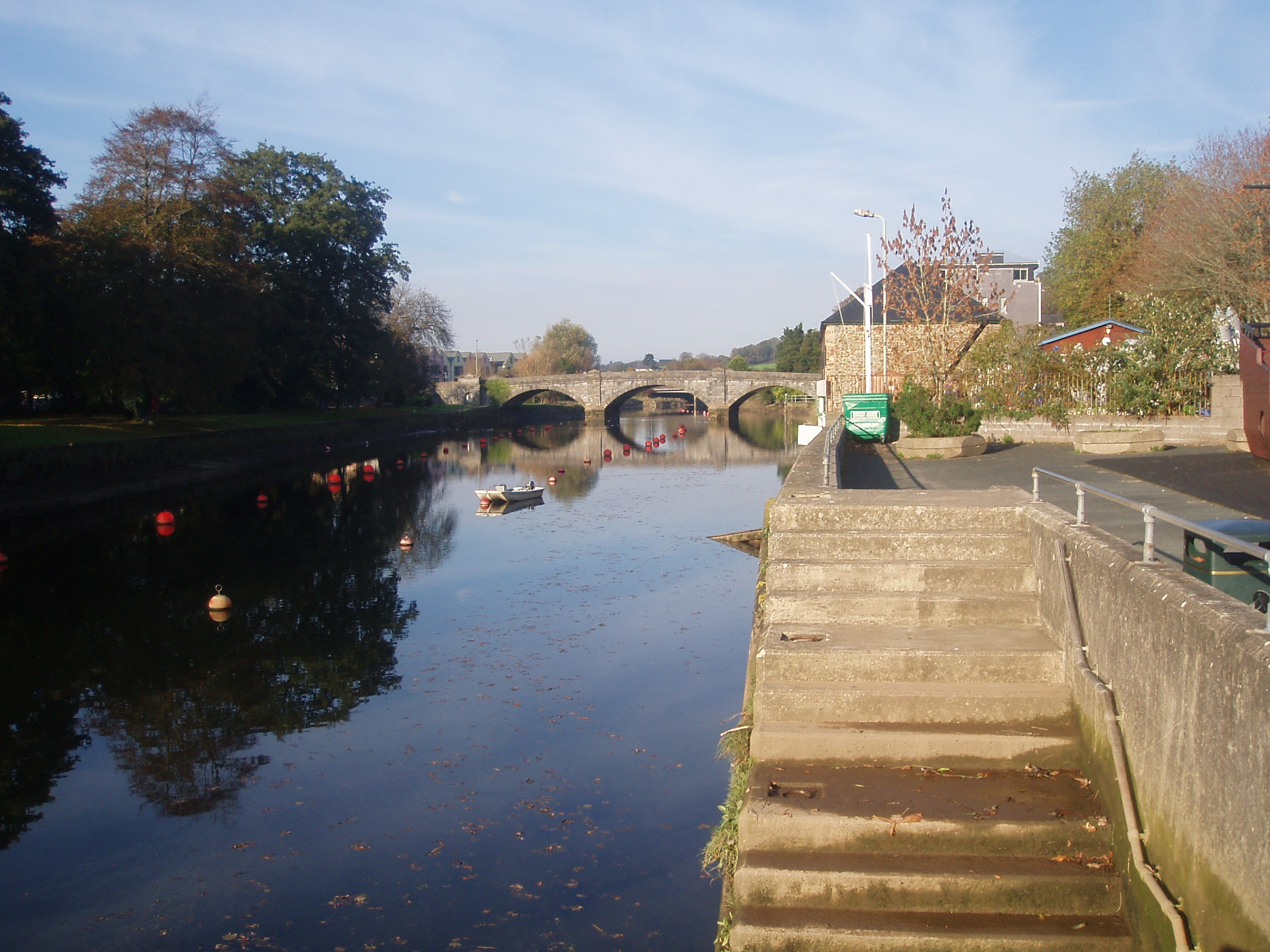
Totnes

Totnes was the first constituency to use an open primary to select the Conservative prospective parliamentary candidate. The election was held in August 2009 and saw a turnout of approximately 25%. Due to the success of this primary election, David Cameron announced that the system would be applied to other constituencies in future. Dr Sarah Wollaston, a general practitioner, was selected with 48% of the vote. Wollaston went on to be elected MP for Totnes at the 2010 general election.

=== Bracknell ===
The Bracknell primary was held in October 2009, and was won by Phillip Lee. Other candidates included Rory Stewart (elected as MP for Penrith and the Border in 2010) and broadcaster Iain Dale.

=== Gosport ===
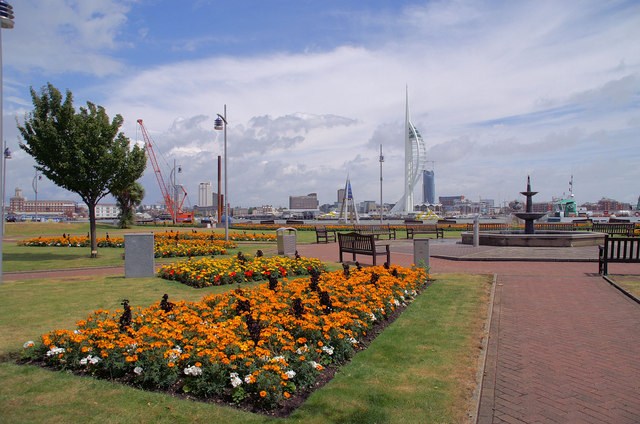
Gosport

Gosport held an open primary to select a candidate to succeed Peter Viggers upon his retirement from Westminster. The election was held in December 2009. Caroline Dinenage, a local business owner and daughter of Fred Dinenage, was selected with 38% of the vote. Dinenage was elected MP for Gosport at the 2010 general election, with an increased majority.

== Clacton by-election, 2014 ==
The 2014 Clacton by-election, caused by the defection from the Conservatives of Douglas Carswell, a prominent advocate of open primaries, selected actor Giles Watling over Colchester councillor Sue Lissimore on 11 September.

== Rochester and Strood by-election, 2014 ==
The candidate for the 2014 Rochester and Strood by-election, caused by the defection from the Conservative Party of Mark Reckless to the UK Independence Party (UKIP), was chosen by a postal open primary. Kelly Tolhurst, a local councillor, narrowly won over fellow councillor Anna Firth. Tolhurst lost the by-election to Reckless, but later won the seat at the following year's general election. Firth would go on to become an MP succeeding Sir David Amess following his murder.

== 2015 general election ==
Constituency	Main article	Date of final selection	Candidate chosen	Conservative seat before election	Candidate elected
Berwick-upon-Tweed		Feb 2013	Anne-Marie Trevelyan	No	Yes
Boston and Skegness		25 Oct 2014	Matt Warman	Yes	Yes
Croydon South		12 Nov 2013	Chris Philp	Yes	Yes
Hampstead and Kilburn	2013 Hampstead and Kilburn Conservative primary	30 January 2013	Simon Marcus	No	No
Louth and Horncastle		28 July 2014	Victoria Atkins	Yes	Yes
Mid Worcestershire		22 November 2013	Nigel Huddleston	Yes	Yes
North East Hampshire		17 November 2013	Ranil Jayawardena	Yes	Yes
South East Cambridgeshire		7 December 2013	Lucy Frazer	Yes	Yes
Tonbridge and Malling		2 November 2013	Tom Tugendhat	Yes	Yes
Twickenham		5 September 2013	Tania Mathias	No	Yes
Wealden		5 December 2013	Nus Ghani	Yes	Yes
West Aberdeenshire and Kincardine		10 March 2014	Alexander Burnett	No	No
Yeovil		July 2013	Marcus Fysh	No	Yes

== 2019 general election ==
Constituency	Main article	Date of final selection	Candidate chosen	Conservative seat before election	Candidate elected
Gower		10 October 2019	Francesca O'Brien	No	No
