= Lorraine Fullbrook =

British politician (born 1959)

The Right Honourable The Baroness Fullbrook

Member of the House of Lords
- Lord Temporal
- Life peerage 7 September 2020

Member of Parliament for South Ribble
- In office 6 May 2010 – 30 March 2015
- Preceded by: David Borrow
- Succeeded by: Seema Kennedy

Cabinet Member of the Hart District Council
- In office 2002 – May 2004

Personal details
- Born: 28 July 1959 (age 67) Glasgow, Scotland
- Party: Conservative
- Spouse: Mark Fullbrook
- Education: Glasgow Caledonian University

Lorraine Fullbrook, Baroness Fullbrook (born 28 July 1959) is a British Conservative former MP for South Ribble, first elected in 2010.

Educated at Glasgow Caledonian University, Mrs Fullbrook was formerly the Conservative Leader of Hart Council in Hampshire. She joined the Cabinet of the council as the Cabinet Member for Communications. Six months later, she was promoted to Cabinet Member for Finance. Six months after taking over the finance portfolio, she was elected as Leader of the Council, after serving just one year as Councillor.

She stepped down from Hart Council in 2004 after being selected as parliamentary candidate for the South Ribble constituency in north-west England.

She first contested the seat at the 2005 general election, when she came second to the incumbent MP, David Borrow. She contested the seat again in the 2010 general election when she defeated David Borrow with an 8.1% swing from the Labour Party to the Conservative Party, and regained the seat for the Conservative Party after 13 years.

In 2013 she announced that she would not contend the next election and would be standing down after just one term.

Fullbrook was nominated for a life peerage by Boris Johnson in the 2019 Dissolution Honours. On 7 September 2020 she was created Baroness Fullbrook, of Dogmersfield in the County of Hampshire.

Parliament of the United Kingdom
Preceded by David Borrow	Member for South Ribble; 2010 – 2015	Succeeded by Seema Kennedy
