= Chris Morris (activist) =

British gay rights activist

Chris Morris (born 23 May 1979) is an activist who, with Euan Sutherland, successfully challenged the British Government in the European Court of Human Rights and secured an equal age of consent for sexual activity between males. He went on to study psychology and work as a political speechwriter and consultant.

== The equal age of consent campaign ==
When male homosexuality was decriminalised in England and Wales in 1967, the age of consent was set at 21. It was lowered to 18 in 1994, but Morris and Sutherland took their case to Europe to demand it be reduced further to 16, the same age as it is for heterosexuals. They invoked Articles 8 and 19 of the European Convention on Human Rights, which guarantee the right to a private life and protection from discrimination.

Their case was originally backed by the gay rights group Stonewall and later Morris formed his own organisation, YouthSpeak, which was funded by Sir Ian McKellen. YouthSpeak sent delegations of teenagers to meet MPs and the media to tell their personal stories about how an unequal age of consent affected their lives. The group also projected a laser beam onto Big Ben demanding "16 for everyone" and delivered a 25,000-strong petition to new prime minister Tony Blair when he was elected in May 1997.

Opposition to the campaign was led by Conservative peer Baroness Young and the then Archbishop of Canterbury, George Carey, among others.

In July 1997, the European Court found that the existence of different ages of consent was discriminatory and that no valid grounds existed to justify that discrimination. They therefore found that the age of consent for homosexual acts should be lowered to 16. In arriving at their conclusion, the court cited their reasoning in the previous cases, Dudgeon v United Kingdom and Norris v. Ireland.

In response to the court's findings, the then Home Secretary Jack Straw agreed with Sutherland and Morris that a Bill would be proposed to Parliament in the summer of 1998 to reduce the age of consent for homosexual acts to 16. The Court approved their "friendly settlement".

After two defeats in the House of Lords, the law was eventually changed as part of the Sexual Offences (Amendment) Act 2000, after the use of the Parliament Acts 1911 and 1949, in November 2000.

== Other gay activism ==
In 1998, Morris became a member of OutRage! and in 1999 he founded and became editor of the gay rights magazine Outcast. Contributors included left-wing Mayor of London Ken Livingstone, Lib Dem leader Charles Kennedy, Foreign Office minister Ben Bradshaw, Anti-Gay author Mark Simpson and veteran activist Peter Tatchell. The magazine satirised and was critical of many gay activists and businesses and Morris was criticised for "biting the hand that fed him" during his age of consent campaign.

With OutRage!, he broke into Lambeth Palace and confronted the then Archbishop of Canterbury, George Carey, about his opposition to an equal age of consent. With Peter Tatchell and two others, he attempted a citizen's arrest on President Robert Mugabe to publicise Mugabe's alleged role in the torture of two opposition journalists (Mark Chavunduka and Ray Choto) in Zimbabwe. He was himself arrested but later released without charge.

In November 2012, Morris wrote an essay on his website (republished by The Guardian) discussing gay identity, where he said that "I don't think I'm Gay any more; I just know I'm in love with a wonderful man. And that is why I support same-sex marriage, because love transcends everything and it doesn't matter who you love as long as you love."

== See also ==
- Stonewall (charity)
- OutRage!
