= Francesca O'Brien =

UK politician (born 1987)

Francesca O'Brien MS
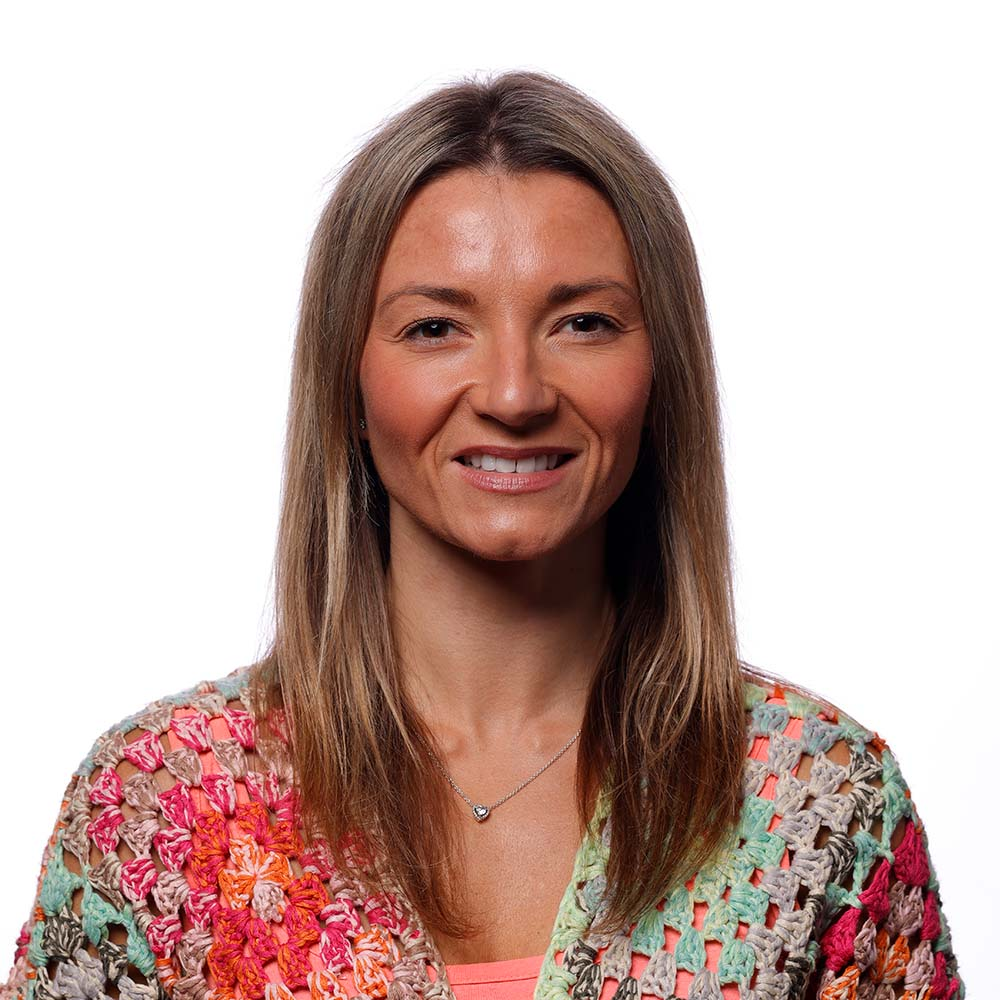
- Official portrait, 2026

Shadow Cabinet Minister for Local Government, Housing and Planning
- Incumbent
- Assumed office 19 May 2026
- Leader: Dan Thomas; Helen Jenner
- Preceded by: Joel James

Member of the Senedd for Gŵyr Abertawe
- Incumbent
- Assumed office 8 May 2026

Swansea Councillor for the Mumbles ward
- In office 7 May 2022 – May 2026
- Preceded by: Ward created

Personal details
- Party: Reform UK (2025–)
- Other political affiliations: Welsh Conservatives (until 2025)
- Spouse: Alex O'Brien
- Education: Swansea University

Francesca Dominique Angela O'Brien (née Lewis; born October 1987) is a Reform UK Wales politician, who has served as Member of the Senedd for Gŵyr Abertawe and Shadow Minister for Local Government, Housing and Planning since May 2026. She is also a councillor, representing the Mumbles ward on Swansea Council.

O'Brien was previously a member of the Welsh Conservatives, having run unsuccessfully for the Gower constituency at the 2019 general election, before being elected to Swansea Council in 2022. She defected to Reform UK in August 2025.

== Background ==
O'Brien was born and raised in the Gower Peninsula. Her father Richard Lewis, was a politician throughout her youth, serving as a councillor for Gower. O'Brien joined RAF Air Cadets aged 17, becoming an officer aged 20. O'Brien studied Criminology and Social Policy at Swansea University. Following her graduation from university, O'Brien worked on a pig farm and for her brother at a mechanics. She is married to Alex O'Brien a fellow air cadet.

== Political career ==
In 2019, O'Brien was selected as the Welsh Conservative candidate for the Gower constituency by way of an open primary, as part of ongoing trials of Conservative Party parliamentary primaries. During the campaign, past remarks from 2014, in which O'Brien stated individuals from Channel 4 TV Show Benefits Street needed 'putting down'. O'Brien apologised, saying her use of language was 'unacceptable' but that the remarks were made 'off the cuff'. She came second, to Labour's Tonia Antoniazzi.

In 2022, O'Brien was elected as a Welsh Conservative councillor for the Mumbles ward on Swansea Council. From 2023 to 2025 she worked as a member of supporting staff for Tom Giffard.

In August 2025, she defected from the Welsh Conservatives to Reform UK. In October 2025, O'Brien chaired a meeting with parents of children at Sea View primary school, alleging that the students were being 'taught Islamic prayer' and being forced to pray on Islamic prayer mats. The meeting was promoted by the group Voice of Wales, which has been designated a far right group by Hope not Hate. The claims were described as 'misinformation' by Swansea Council, and by Cabinet Secretary for Education, Lynne Neagle. In November 2025 O'Brien opposed a Swansea Council motion that would reaffirm Swansea's status as a City of Sanctuary. She was one of only two councillors who opposed the motion, stating that she voted against it as she was concerned about illegal immigration and wanted to represent working families in Swansea.

In March 2026, she was announced as Reform's lead candidate on their Gŵyr Abertawe list. She was successfully elected at the May 7 election.

On 19 May 2026 she was appointed as Shadow Cabinet Minister for Local Government, Housing and Planning in the Thomas shadow cabinet.
