= Robert Atkins (politician) =

British Conservative politician (born 1946)

The Right Honourable Cllr Sir Robert Atkins
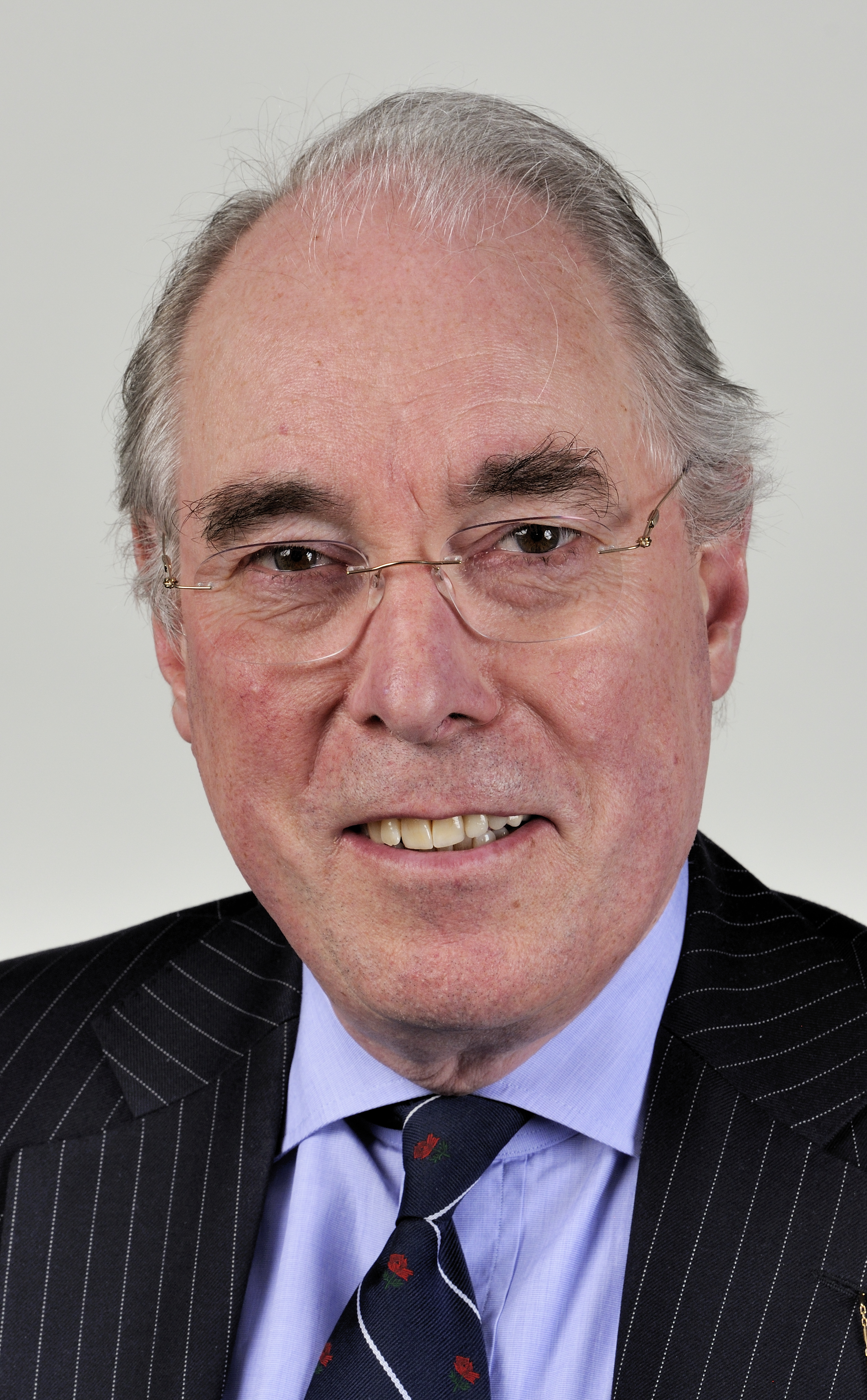
- Official portrait, 2014

Member of the European Parliament for North West England
- In office 10 June 1999 – 2 July 2014
- Preceded by: constituency established
- Succeeded by: Steven Woolfe

Minister of State for Environment and Countryside
- In office 7 January 1994 – 5 July 1995
- Prime Minister: John Major
- Preceded by: Tim Yeo
- Succeeded by: The Earl Ferrers

Minister of State for Northern Ireland
- In office 14 April 1992 – 11 January 1994
- Prime Minister: John Major
- Preceded by: The Lord Belstead
- Succeeded by: Michael Ancram

Minister for Sport
- In office 26 July 1990 – 14 April 1992
- Prime Minister: Margaret Thatcher; John Major
- Preceded by: Colin Moynihan
- Succeeded by: Robert Key

Parliamentary Under-Secretary of State for Transport
- In office 25 July 1989 – 22 July 1990
- Prime Minister: Margaret Thatcher
- Preceded by: The Lord Brabazon of Tara
- Succeeded by: Christopher Chope

Parliamentary Under-Secretary of State for Trade and Industry
- In office 13 June 1987 – 26 July 1989
- Prime Minister: Margaret Thatcher
- Preceded by: Michael Howard
- Succeeded by: John Redwood

Member of Parliament for South Ribble
- In office 9 June 1983 – 8 April 1997
- Preceded by: constituency established
- Succeeded by: David Borrow

Member of Parliament for Preston North
- In office 3 May 1979 – 13 May 1983
- Preceded by: Ronald Atkins
- Succeeded by: constituency abolished

Personal details
- Born: Robert James Atkins; 5 February 1946 (age 80) London, England
- Party: Conservative

Sir Robert James Atkins (born 5 February 1946) is a British Conservative politician. He was the Member of Parliament (MP) for Preston North from 1979 to 1983, and then for South Ribble from 1983 to 1997. He served as Member of the European Parliament (MEP) for the North West England region from 1999 to 2014. He has served as a Councillor (Garstang Ward) on Wyre Borough Council since 2019.

== Early life ==
Atkins was born on 5 February 1946 in London, England. He was educated at Highgate School, then an all-boys private school in Highgate, London.

== Political career ==
Atkins began his political career at a local level. He served as a councillor for the London Borough of Haringey from 1968 to 1977.

After unsuccessfully campaigning for the new seat of Luton West in February and October 1974, he was elected the Member of Parliament for Preston North from 1979 to 1983, and for South Ribble from 1983 to 1997. From 1984 to 1987 he was President of Conservative Trade Unionists. Parliamentary Private Secretary to Norman Lamont MP 1982-85 and then Lord Young of Grafham 1985-87. Parliamentary Under-Secretary for Industry (DTI) 1987-89. Parliamentary Under-Secretary for Roads & Traffic (DOT) 1989-90. Parliamentary Under-Secretary (Minister for Sport) (DOE & then D/Education) 1990-92. Minister of State (Northern Ireland) 1992-94. Minister of State for the Environment & Countryside (DOE) 1994-95. He was made a member of the Privy Council in 1995 and knighted in 1997.

He later became a Member of the European Parliament for the North West England region in 1999. He was Deputy Leader of the Conservatives in the European Parliament until November 2007 and was Chief Whip there from November 2008 to November 2009. He was Conservative Spokesman on Industry and External Trade from 2001 to 2004, and was Spokesman on Regional Policy, Transport and Tourism from 1999 to 2001.) He was a member of the Foreign Affairs Committee and the Transport & Tourism Committee. He stood down at the 2014 European Elections.

In 2019, he was elected as a councillor for the Garstang ward of the Borough of Wyre in Lancashire.

== Honours ==
Atkins was knighted in the 1997 Dissolution Honours List in recognition of his service as a Member of Parliament, as Minister of State for Northern Ireland and as Minister of State for the Environment. He is a Freeman of the City of London.

== Family ==
Atkins is married to Dulcie Mary Atkins (b.1946), who is a fellow Conservative councillor in Wyre, and who served as her husband's personal assistant during his tenure as an MEP.

Their daughter Victoria Atkins was elected at the 2015 general election as the Conservative MP for Louth and Horncastle. In November 2023 she was made Secretary of State for Health and Social Care.

Parliament of the United Kingdom
Preceded by Ronald Atkins	Member of Parliament for Preston North; 1979 – 1983	Constituency abolished
New constituency	Member of Parliament for South Ribble; 1983 – 1997	Succeeded by David Borrow
Political offices
Preceded by Colin Moynihan	Minister for Sport; 1990–1992	Succeeded by Robert Key
