= David Borrow =

British Labour Party politician

Member of Parliament for South Ribble
- In office 1 May 1997 – 12 April 2010
- Preceded by: Sir Robert Atkins
- Succeeded by: Lorraine Fullbrook

Personal details
- Born: 2 August 1952 (age 74) Huddersfield, England
- Party: Labour
- Domestic partner: John Garland
- Education: Coventry University

David Stanley Borrow (born 2 August 1952) is a British Labour Party politician, who was the Member of Parliament (MP) for South Ribble from 1997 to 2010. He served as a Labour Party councillor on Preston City Council from 2011 to his resignation in 2024, and was appointed Mayor of Preston on 15 May 2019.

== Education ==
Born in Huddersfield, Borrow was educated at Mirfield Grammar school and the Lanchester Polytechnic (now Coventry University) where he was awarded a degree in economics.

== Political career ==
He joined the Labour Party in 1970 aged 18, and in 1973 he became a trainee at the Yorkshire Bank. He was appointed as an assistant clerk at the Lancashire Valuations Tribunal in 1975, being promoted to Deputy Clerk in 1978. He was the Deputy Clerk to the Manchester South Valuations Tribunal in 1981, before becoming the Clerk to The Tribunal at the Merseyside Valuations Tribunal in 1983. Borrow was elected as a councillor to the Preston Borough Council in 1987, and was the council leader between 1992 and 1994, and again from 1995 until his election to Westminster. He stood down from the council in 1998.

He contested the parliamentary seat of Wyre at the 1992 general election, and finished second 11,664 votes behind Conservative MP Keith Mans. At the 1997 general election, Borrow contested South Ribble, the seat of the former Conservative Minister of State Robert Atkins. Borrow was selected to fight the seat at the last minute after the previous candidate fell ill. South Ribble was one of the many seats which was won by Labour in 1997, and Borrow was elected to serve as the Labour Member of Parliament for the South Ribble constituency with a majority of 5,084, and held the seat until 2010. He made his maiden speech on 3 July 1997.

He joined the Agriculture Select Committee in 1999. Following the 2001 general election, he joined the newly formed Environment, Food and Rural Affairs Select Committee. In 2003 he became the Parliamentary private secretary (PPS) to the Minister of State at the Department for Transport Kim Howells, and remained so when his boss moved sideways to the Department for Education and Skills in 2004. He did not remain as Howells's PPS after the 2005 general election.

He was formerly a member of the Defence Select Committee.

== Personal life ==
Borrow is an openly gay man. He came out publicly in 1998 to be able to speak honestly during the age of consent campaign and raise issues that are important to all lesbians and gay men. He also contributed articles to the gay rights magazine Outcast.

He entered into a civil partnership with John Garland, his long standing partner, in May 2006, the first MP to do so.

== Footnotes ==
Parliament of the United Kingdom
Preceded by Robert Atkins	Member for South Ribble; 1997–2010	Succeeded by {{{after}}}
