= Farington Moss =

Village in Lancashire, England

Coordinates: 53.708°N 2.709°W

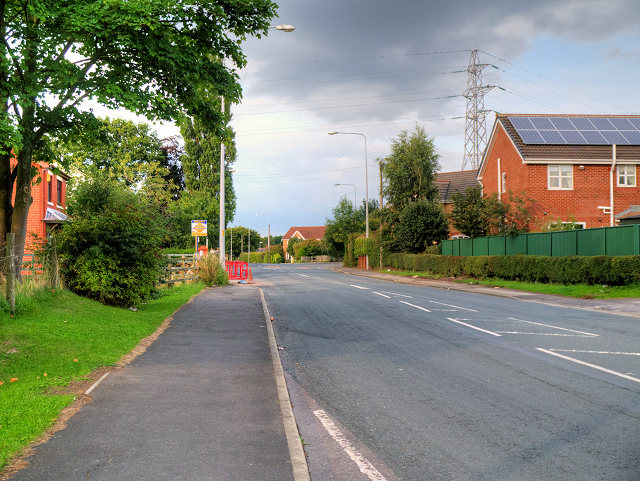
- Croston Road, Farington Moss

- Shown within South Ribble Location within Lancashire
- OS grid reference: SD533241
- Civil parish: Farington
- District: South Ribble
- Shire county: Lancashire
- Region: North West
- Country: England
- Sovereign state: United Kingdom
- Post town: LEYLAND
- Postcode district: PR26
- Dialling code: 01772
- Police: Lancashire
- Fire: Lancashire
- Ambulance: North West
- UK Parliament: Ribble Valley

Farington Moss is a village approximately two miles to the north of Leyland, Lancashire, England. It is a typical English village with one school and one church (St Pauls). To the northeast of the village runs the main west coast railway line.

Farington Moss includes School Lane, although the postal address is Lostock Hall. Proof of this fact can be found on the Council Tax Bill of 2010 which clearly states School Lane (F). Sources within South Ribble Borough Council have revealed that the (F) represents (Farington) as opposed to School Lane (B), which stands for Bamber Bridge, and School Lane (L), School Lane, Leyland.

Farington Moss is also home to RAWS, the Residents Against Waste Site, which was formed by Judith England in 2007 as a protest group by the residents of Farington Moss. The Waste Site has now been built on land sold by Leyland Trucks (Leyland).

In February 2016, councilors on County Hall's executive scrutiny committee voted to mothball the plant, which cost £125m to build, and instead send the green and food waste they processed to landfill. The 160 workers at the plant were told of the plans to cut costs by the cash-strapped Preston Borough county council and a proposal was put forward to change the way waste was dealt with in the county. It is estimated that £125m was invested in the site run by Australian firm Global Renewables.
