= Bevan Brittan =

- Headquarters: Bristol, BS2 0HQ; United Kingdom
- No. of offices: 4 offices in the United Kingdom
- No. of attorneys: 300+
- No. of employees: 500+
- Date founded: 2004
- Company type: Limited Liability Partnership
- Website: www.bevanbrittan.com

Bevan Brittan is a UK Top-100 law firm which provides legal and advisory services to 1,600 businesses and organizations across a number of markets. While the firm formally became Bevan Brittan in 2004, its roots can be traced back to the early 19th century.

It operates from four offices in England (Bristol (head office), Birmingham, Leeds and London), employing more than 500 people. The firm’s revenue exceeded £60 million for the first time in 2021/22, its ninth consecutive year of growth.

It was ranked 70th in The Lawyer UK 200 in 2022, which is based on firm wide revenue, and recognised in The Times Best Law Firms 2023.

Bevan Brittan provides a wide range of legal advice from commercial, corporate and property to employment and litigation. It supports markets including construction, energy & resource management, higher education, financial services, central and local government, housing and health and social care.

The firm has also been appointed to frameworks to support central government departments, local authorities and NHS bodies. It is a supplier on the Crown Commercial Service Central Government Public Sector Legal Service, and other legal panels including EM Law share.
