= South Ribble (constituency) =

UK Parliament constituency (since 1983)

Coordinates: 53.717°N 2.697°W

- County constituency for the House of Commons
- Interactive map of boundaries since 2024
- Location within North West England
- County: Lancashire
- Electorate: 72,092 (March 2020)
- Major settlements: Leyland and Penwortham

Current constituency
- Created: 1983
- Member of Parliament: Paul Foster (Labour)
- Seats: One
- Created from: Preston South, Fylde South and Chorley

South Ribble is a constituency represented in the House of Commons of the UK Parliament since 2024 by Paul Foster for Labour.

== Constituency profile ==
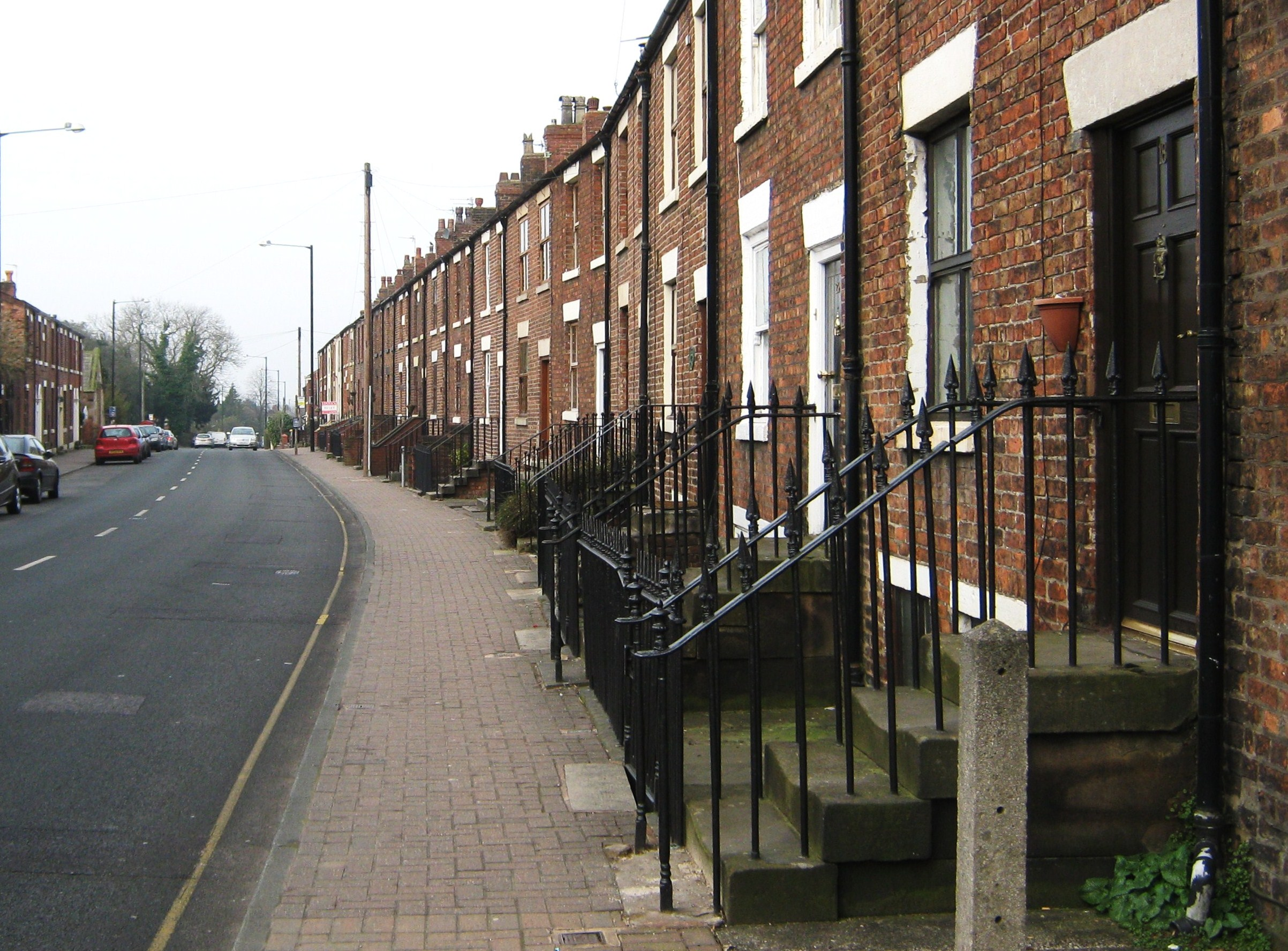
Fox Lane, Leyland

South Ribble is a constituency in Lancashire in North West England, covering parts of the South Ribble and Chorley boroughs. Its largest town is Leyland, which has a population of around 42,000. Other settlements include the town of Penwortham and the villages of Longton, Farington Moss, Eccleston and parts of Lostock Hall and Euxton.

This constituency covers towns and villages to the south of Preston. Penwortham is an affluent town that largely functions as a suburb of Preston, lying on the opposite bank of the River Ribble after which the constituency is named. Leyland is known for its automotive engineering industry; Leyland Motors was based in the town and, whilst the industry has declined, lorries are still manufactured here. There is some deprivation in Leyland but its outer neighbourhoods are mostly wealthy. House prices across the constituency are generally similar to the rest of North West England but lower than the UK average.

South Ribble has a below-average proportion of young adults and a large retired population. Residents have above-average rates of income, high levels of homeownership, and the child poverty rate is low. They have average levels of education and a high proportion are religious; like much of Lancashire, there is a large Roman Catholic population here due to historic Irish migration. A high proportion of residents work in the manufacturing and construction sectors and the percentage claiming unemployment benefits is low. White people made up 96% of the population at the 2021 census.

At the local district council level, Leyland is represented by the Labour Party, Penwortham mostly by Liberal Democrats and the rural villages by Conservatives. At the county council, which held elections more recently (in 2025), most of the constituency elected Reform UK councillors. An estimated 58% of voters in South Ribble supported leaving the European Union in the 2016 referendum, higher than the UK-wide figure of 52%.

== History ==
The seat of South Ribble was created for the 1983 general election, following the local government changes in the 1970s which saw the creation of the main constitutive borough of the same name. It has been a classic bellwether seat since its creation, changing hands with the change of government.

Former Preston North MP Robert Atkins won the South Ribble constituency in 1983 and fought the seat in every election up to the 1997 general election. At that time, in dramatic bellwether fashion, Labour's David Borrow gained the seat on a clear majority, with nearly 26,000 votes, 2,000 less than Atkins' victory in the corresponding "landslide" year of 1983. From 1997 until 2010, David Borrow's vote total and majority consistently shrunk with a swing back to the Conservatives at every election. In terms of the other parties, Liberal Democrats have not thus far achieved better than third and 2005 saw UKIP nominating a candidate for the first time, and taking just over 1,200 votes.

Borrow finally lost South Ribble in 2010 on a large two-party swing to Conservative Lorraine Fullbrook. In 2024, the seat was regained by Labour with a swing of over 15%.

== Boundaries ==
Map of 2010-2024 boundaries

=== Historic ===
1983–1997: The Borough of South Ribble.

1997–2010: The Borough of South Ribble wards of Charnock, Farington, Howick, Hutton and New Longton, Kingsfold, Leyland Central, Leyland St Ambrose, Leyland St John's, Leyland St Mary's, Little Hoole and Much Hoole, Longton Central and West, Lostock Hall, Manor, Middleforth Green, Moss Side, Priory, and Seven Stars, and the District of West Lancashire wards of Hesketh with Becconsall, North Meols, Rufford, and Tarleton.

For the 1997 general election, the communities of Bamber Bridge and Walton-le-Dale were moved to the Preston constituency. To partly compensate, the four mainly rural wards in the District of West Lancashire were transferred from the West Lancashire constituency.

2010–2024: The Borough of South Ribble wards of Broad Oak, Charnock, Earnshaw Bridge, Golden Hill, Howick and Priory, Kingsfold, Leyland Central, Leyland St Ambrose, Leyland St Mary's, Little Hoole and Much Hoole, Longton and Hutton West, Lowerhouse, Middleforth, Moss Side, New Longton and Hutton East, Seven Stars, and Whitefield, the District of West Lancashire wards of Hesketh with Becconsall, North Meols, Rufford, and Tarleton, and the Borough of Chorley wards of Eccleston and Mawdesley, and Lostock.

Following the review of parliamentary representation in Lancashire prior to the 2010 general election, Walton-le-Dale and Bamber Bridge were subsequently transferred into the Ribble Valley seat, along with the villages of Samlesbury, Higher Walton, Coupe Green, Gregson Lane, Lostock Hall, Farington and Farington Moss. This meant that the borough of South Ribble was now split between the South Ribble and Ribble Valley parliamentary seats.

=== Current ===
Further to the 2023 review of Westminster constituencies which came into effect for the 2024 United Kingdom general election, the constituency is composed of the following (as they existed on 1 December 2020):

- The Borough of Chorley wards of: Croston, Mawdesley & Euxton South; Eccleston, Heskin & Charnock Richard.
- The Borough of South Ribble wards of: Broad Oak; Broadfield; Buckshaw & Worden; Charnock; Earnshaw Bridge; Farington East; Farington West; Hoole; Howick & Priory; Leyland Central; Longton & Hutton West; Middleforth; Moss Side; New Longton & Hutton East; St. Ambrose; Seven Stars.

The four West Lancashire Borough wards were transferred to Southport. To compensate, Farington was transferred back in from Ribble Valley and there was a small gain from Chorley due to ward boundary changes.

The seat's original boundaries were coterminous with the South Ribble borough. Due to population changes, the borough of South Ribble and its parliamentary constituency have not shared the same boundaries since, although the towns of Leyland and Penwortham have always featured at the centre of the constituency.

== Members of Parliament ==
| Election | Member | Party |
|---|---|---|
| 1983 | Robert Atkins | Conservative |
| 1997 | David Borrow | Labour |
| 2010 | Lorraine Fullbrook | Conservative |
| 2015 | Seema Kennedy | Conservative |
| 2019 | Katherine Fletcher | Conservative |
| 2024 | Paul Foster | Labour |

== Elections ==
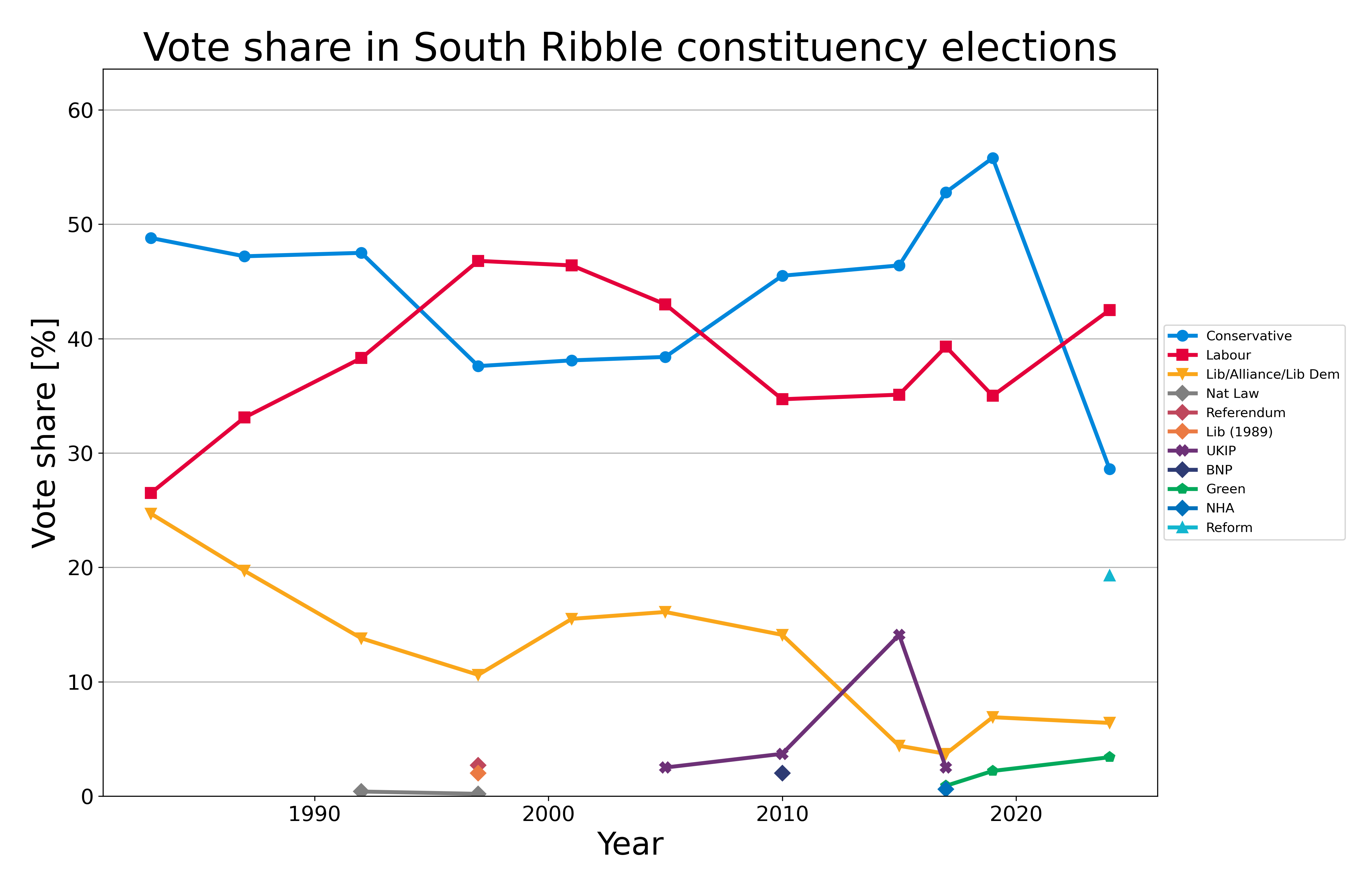
South Ribble election results

=== Elections in the 2020s ===
General election 2024: South Ribble
| Party | Candidate | Votes | % | ±% |
|---|---|---|---|---|
| Labour | Paul Foster | 19,840 | 42.5 | +6.3 |
| Conservative | Katherine Fletcher | 13,339 | 28.6 | −24.9 |
| Reform | Andy Hunter | 8,995 | 19.3 | N/A |
| Liberal Democrats | Angela Turner | 2,972 | 6.4 | −1.3 |
| Green | Stephani Mok | 1,574 | 3.4 | +0.9 |
| Majority | | 6,501 | 13.9 | N/A |
| Turnout | | 46,720 | 63.9 | −4.7 |
| Registered electors | | 73,420 | | |
| Labour gain from Conservative | | Swing | +15.6 | |

=== Elections in the 2010s ===
General election 2019: South Ribble
| Party | Candidate | Votes | % | ±% |
|---|---|---|---|---|
| Conservative | Katherine Fletcher | 30,028 | 55.8 | +3.0 |
| Labour | Kim Snape | 18,829 | 35.0 | ―4.3 |
| Liberal Democrats | Jo Barton | 3,720 | 6.9 | +3.2 |
| Green | Andy Fewings | 1,207 | 2.2 | +1.3 |
| Majority | | 11,199 | 20.8 | +7.3 |
| Turnout | | 53,784 | 71.4 | ―0.6 |
| Conservative hold | | Swing | +3.7 | |

General election 2017: South Ribble
| Party | Candidate | Votes | % | ±% |
|---|---|---|---|---|
| Conservative | Seema Kennedy | 28,980 | 52.9 | +6.4 |
| Labour | Julie Gibson | 21,559 | 39.3 | +4.2 |
| Liberal Democrats | John Wright | 2,073 | 3.7 | ―0.7 |
| UKIP | Mark Smith | 1,387 | 2.5 | ―11.6 |
| Green | Andrew Wight | 494 | 0.9 | New |
| NHA | Mark Jamell | 341 | 0.6 | New |
| Majority | | 7,421 | 13.5 | +2.2 |
| Turnout | | 54,834 | 72.0 | +3.5 |
| Conservative hold | | Swing | +1.1 | |

General election 2015: South Ribble
| Party | Candidate | Votes | % | ±% |
|---|---|---|---|---|
| Conservative | Seema Kennedy | 24,313 | 46.4 | +0.9 |
| Labour | Veronica Bennett | 18,368 | 35.1 | +0.4 |
| UKIP | David Gallagher | 7,377 | 14.1 | +10.4 |
| Liberal Democrats | Sue McGuire | 2,312 | 4.4 | ―9.7 |
| Majority | | 5,945 | 11.3 | +0.5 |
| Turnout | | 52,370 | 68.5 | +0.6 |
| Conservative hold | | Swing | | |

General election 2010: South Ribble
| Party | Candidate | Votes | % | ±% |
|---|---|---|---|---|
| Conservative | Lorraine Fullbrook | 23,396 | 45.5 | +7.1 |
| Labour | David Borrow | 17,842 | 34.7 | ―9.6 |
| Liberal Democrats | Peter Fisher | 7,271 | 14.1 | ―0.6 |
| UKIP | David Duxbury | 1,895 | 3.7 | +1.5 |
| BNP | Rosalind Gauci | 1,054 | 2.0 | New |
| Majority | | 5,554 | 10.8 | N/A |
| Turnout | | 51,458 | 67.9 | +4.4 |
| Conservative gain from Labour | | Swing | +8.1 | |

=== Elections in the 2000s ===
General election 2005: South Ribble
| Party | Candidate | Votes | % | ±% |
|---|---|---|---|---|
| Labour | David Borrow | 20,428 | 43.0 | ―3.4 |
| Conservative | Lorraine Fullbrook | 18,244 | 38.4 | +0.3 |
| Liberal Democrats | Mark Alcock | 7,634 | 16.1 | +0.6 |
| UKIP | Kenneth Jones | 1,205 | 2.5 | New |
| Majority | | 2,184 | 4.6 | ―3.7 |
| Turnout | | 47,511 | 63.0 | +0.5 |
| Labour hold | | Swing | ―1.9 | |

General election 2001: South Ribble
| Party | Candidate | Votes | % | ±% |
|---|---|---|---|---|
| Labour | David Borrow | 21,386 | 46.4 | ―0.4 |
| Conservative | Adrian Owens | 17,584 | 38.1 | +0.5 |
| Liberal Democrats | Mark Alcock | 7,150 | 15.5 | +4.9 |
| Majority | | 3,802 | 8.3 | ―0.9 |
| Turnout | | 46,120 | 62.5 | ―14.6 |
| Labour hold | | Swing | ―0.5 | |

=== Elections in the 1990s ===
General election 1997: South Ribble
| Party | Candidate | Votes | % | ±% |
|---|---|---|---|---|
| Labour | David Borrow | 25,856 | 46.8 | +12.0 |
| Conservative | Robert Atkins | 20,772 | 37.6 | ―12.3 |
| Liberal Democrats | Tim Farron | 5,879 | 10.6 | ―4.2 |
| Referendum | Mark Adams | 1,475 | 2.7 | New |
| Liberal | Nigel R. Ashton | 1,127 | 2.0 | New |
| Natural Law | Bibette Leadbetter | 122 | 0.2 | ―0.2 |
| Majority | | 5,084 | 9.2 | N/A |
| Turnout | | 55,231 | 77.1 | ―5.9 |
| Labour gain from Conservative | | Swing | +12.1 | |

General election 1992: South Ribble
| Party | Candidate | Votes | % | ±% |
|---|---|---|---|---|
| Conservative | Robert Atkins | 30,828 | 47.5 | +0.3 |
| Labour | Geoffrey Smith | 24,855 | 38.3 | +5.2 |
| Liberal Democrats | Simon Jones | 8,928 | 13.8 | ―5.9 |
| Natural Law | Decter Ronald | 269 | 0.4 | New |
| Majority | | 5,973 | 9.2 | ―4.9 |
| Turnout | | 64,880 | 83.0 | +0.5 |
| Conservative hold | | Swing | ―2.5 | |

=== Elections in the 1980s ===
General election 1987: South Ribble
| Party | Candidate | Votes | % | ±% |
|---|---|---|---|---|
| Conservative | Robert Atkins | 28,133 | 47.2 | ―1.6 |
| Labour | David Roebuck | 19,703 | 33.1 | +6.6 |
| Liberal | Joseph Alan Holleran | 11,746 | 19.7 | ―5.0 |
| Majority | | 8,430 | 14.1 | ―8.2 |
| Turnout | | 59,582 | 82.5 | +4.5 |
| Conservative hold | | Swing | ―4.1 | |

General election 1983: South Ribble
| Party | Candidate | Votes | % | ±% |
|---|---|---|---|---|
| Conservative | Robert Atkins | 27,625 | 48.8 | |
| Labour | Frank Duffy | 14,966 | 26.5 | |
| Liberal | Robert Walker | 13,960 | 24.7 | |
| Majority | | 12,659 | 22.3 | |
| Turnout | | 56,551 | 78.0 | |
| Conservative win (new seat) | | | | |

== See also ==
- List of parliamentary constituencies in Lancashire
