= Paul Foster (politician) =

British politician

Paul Foster MP
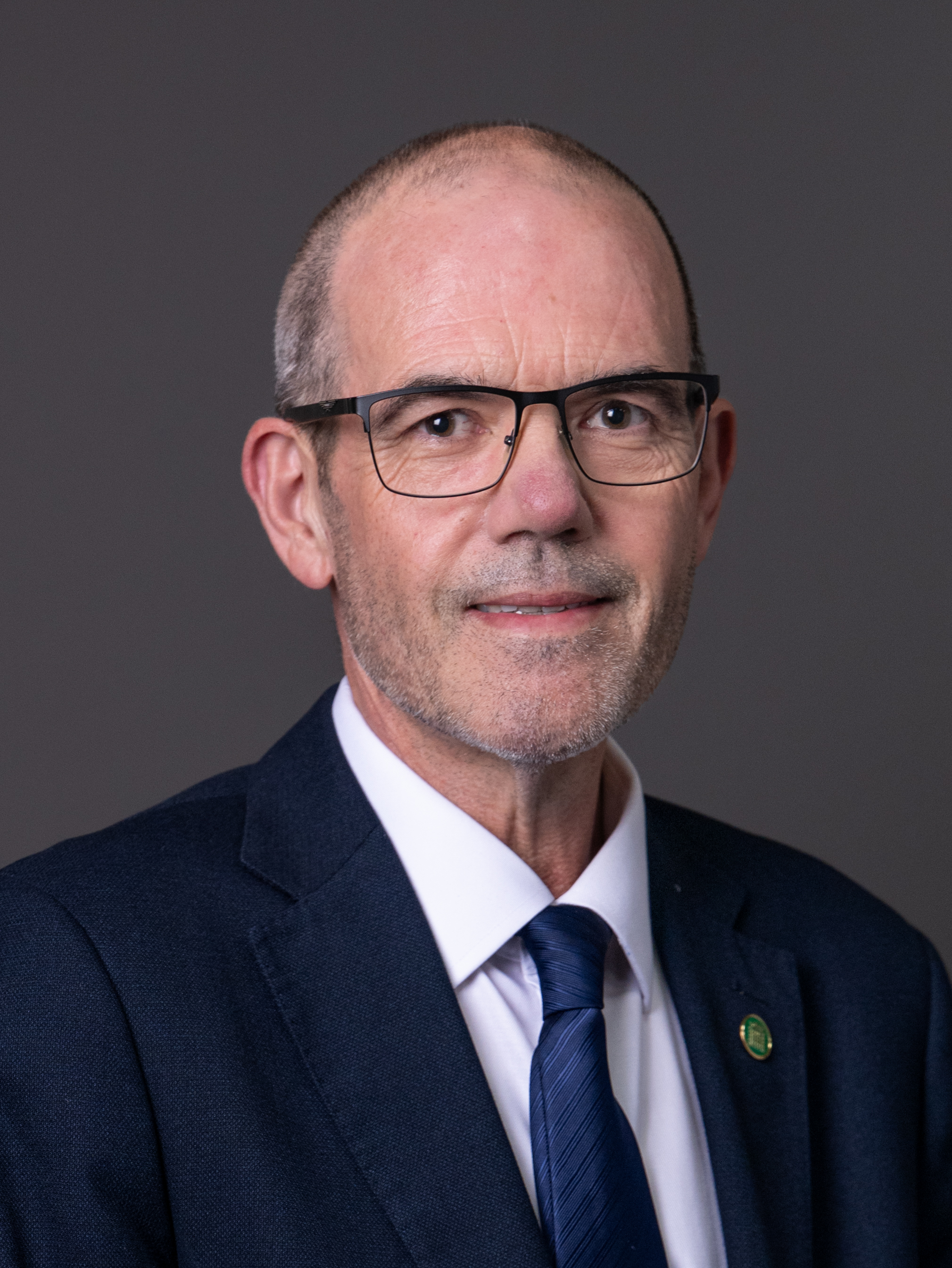
- Official portrait, 2026

Member of Parliament for South Ribble
- Incumbent
- Assumed office 4 July 2024
- Preceded by: Katherine Fletcher
- Majority: 6,501 (13.9%)

Personal details
- Party: Labour

Paul Andrew Foster is a British Labour politician who has been Member of Parliament for South Ribble since 2024.

== Political career ==
Foster was previously leader of South Ribble Borough Council for five years.

He is an army veteran. In his maiden speech, Foster said, "I was brought up in Barrow-in-Furness, and I have a continuing passion for Barrow AFC. However, during the crippling strikes at the shipyard in 1988 in response to Margaret Thatcher's targeted attacks on the UK's manufacturing industry, I ended up joining the British Army's Corps of Royal Engineers at the tender age of 18." Foster served for just under 15 years, "serving operationally in the first Gulf war on Operation Haven and in the Kosovo conflict in 1999, to name but two." He left the army in 2003.

In November 2024, Foster voted in favour of the Terminally Ill Adults (End of Life) Bill, which proposes to legalise assisted suicide.

On 12 May 2026, Foster joined a growing number of Labour MPs calling on Prime Minister Keir Starmer to resign.

Parliament of the United Kingdom
Preceded by Katherine Fletcher	Member of Parliament for South Ribble; 2024–present	Incumbent
