= South Ribble =

Coordinates: 53.697°N 2.690°W

- Borough and non-metropolitan district
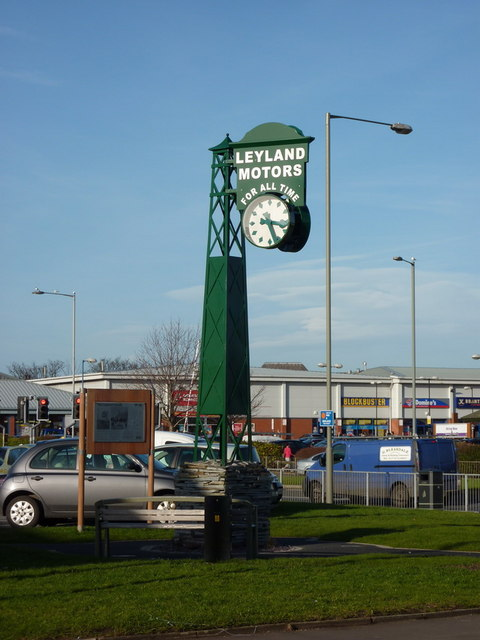
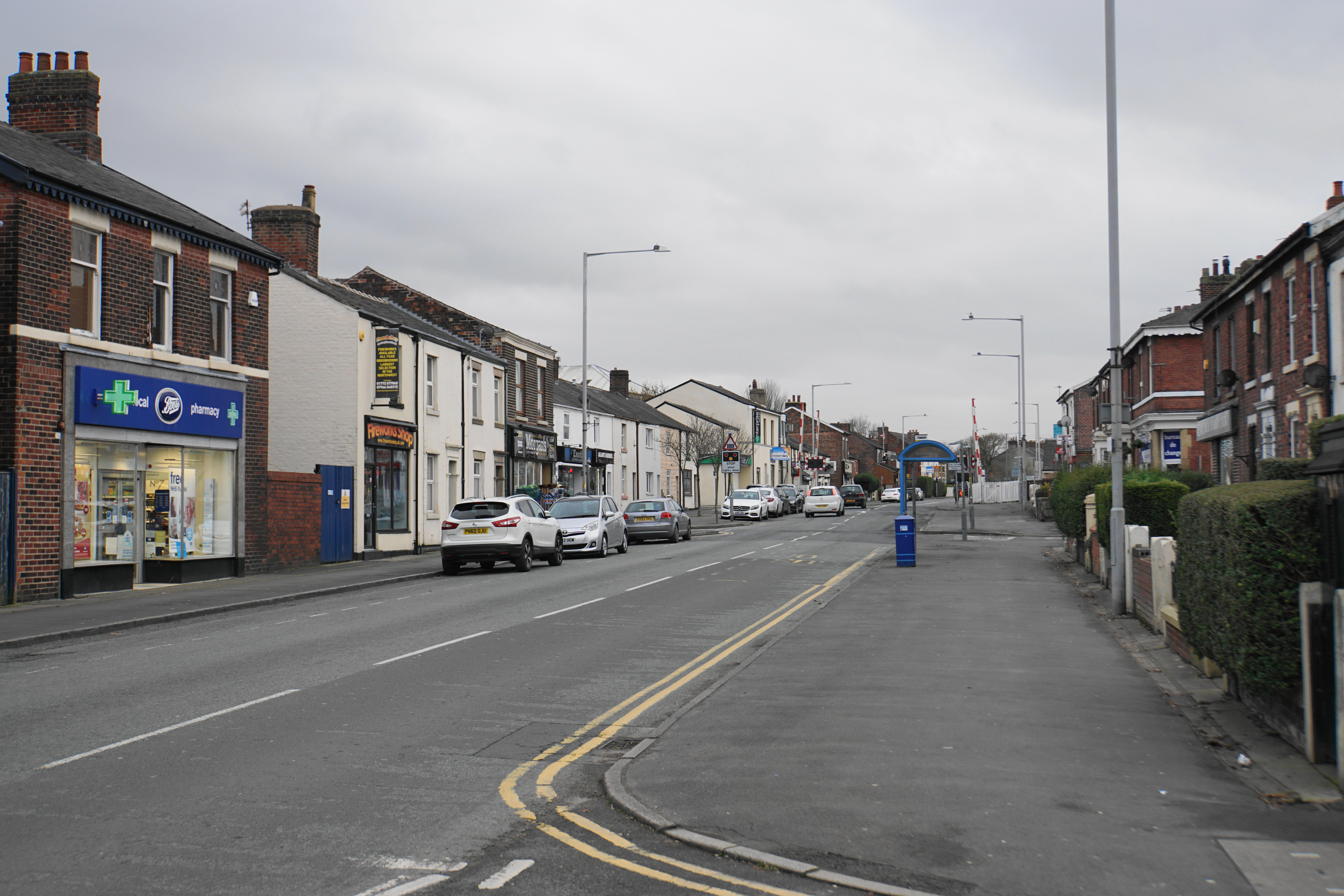
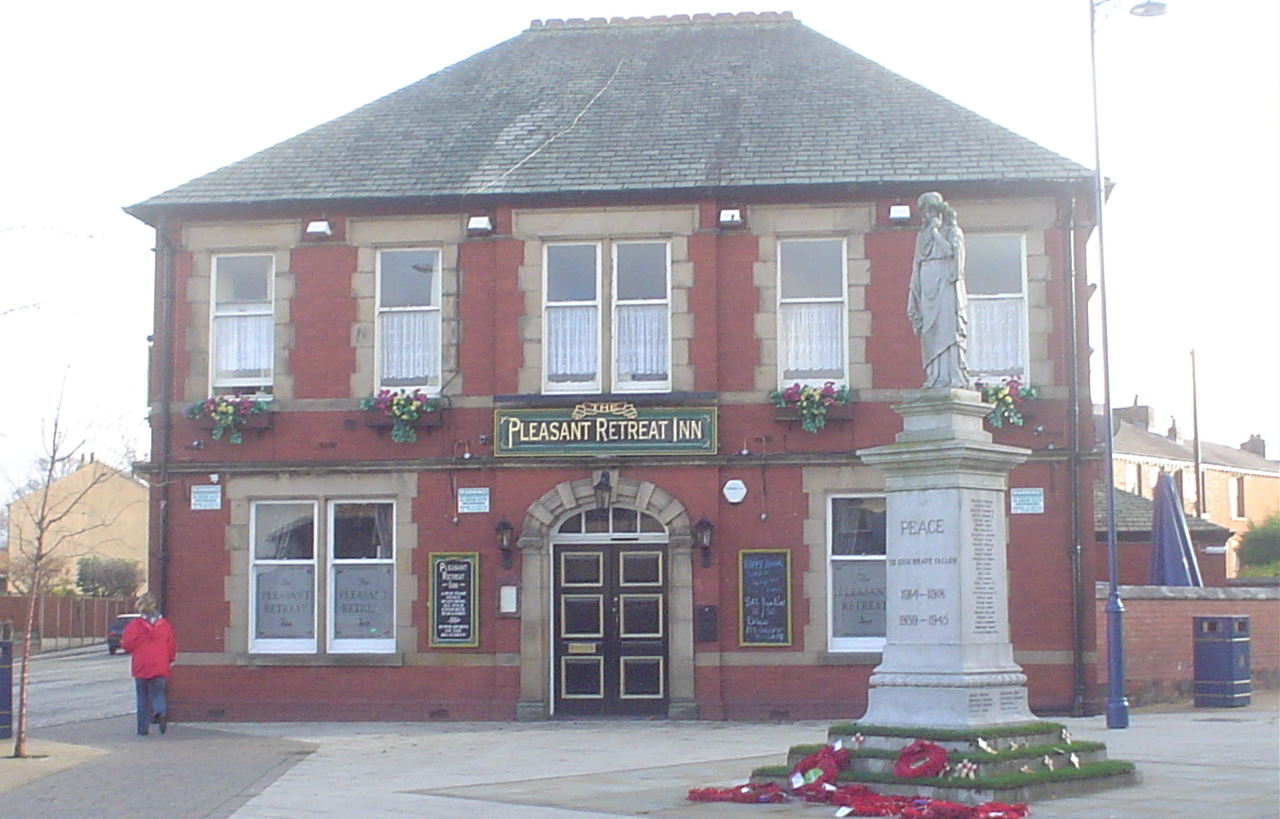
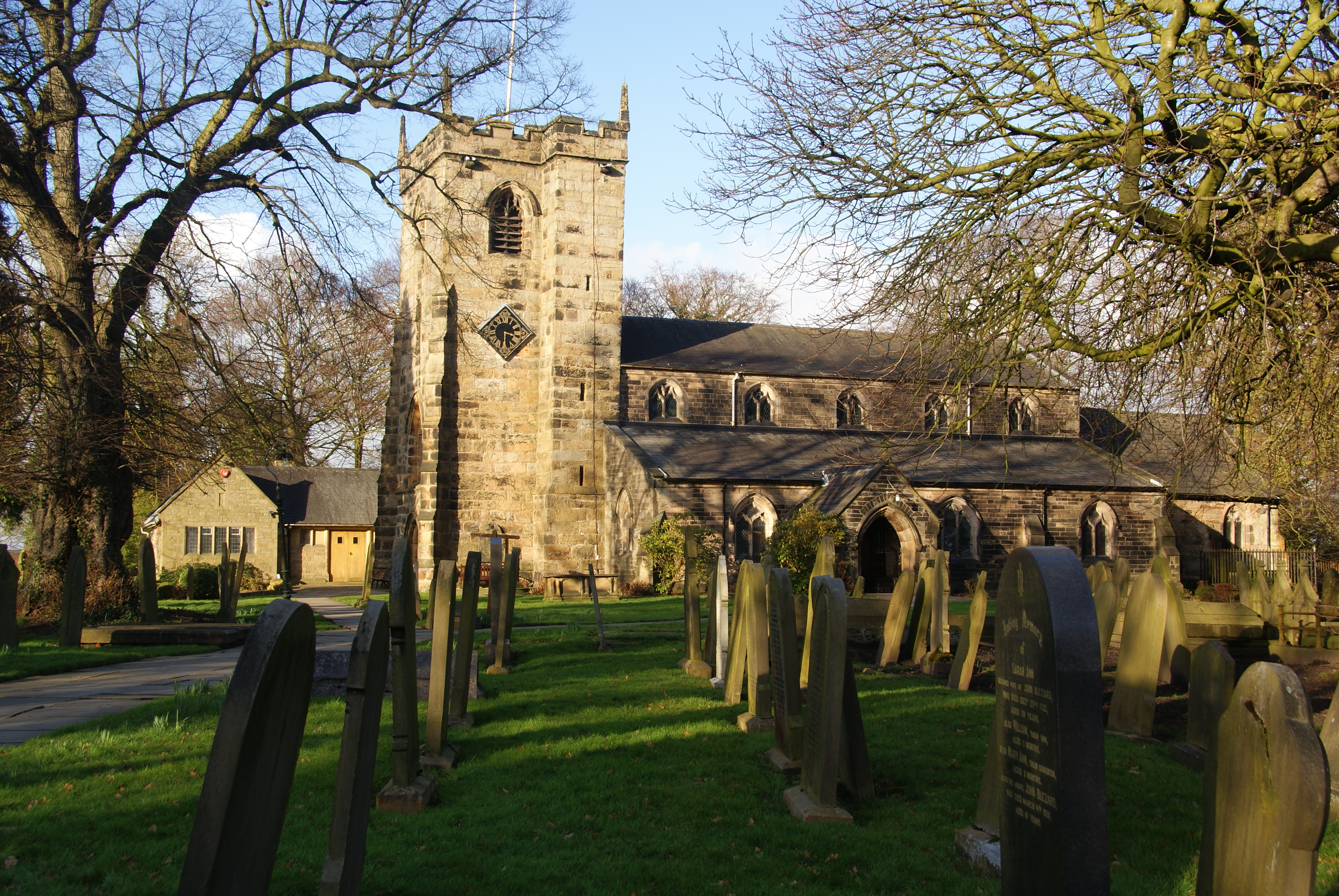
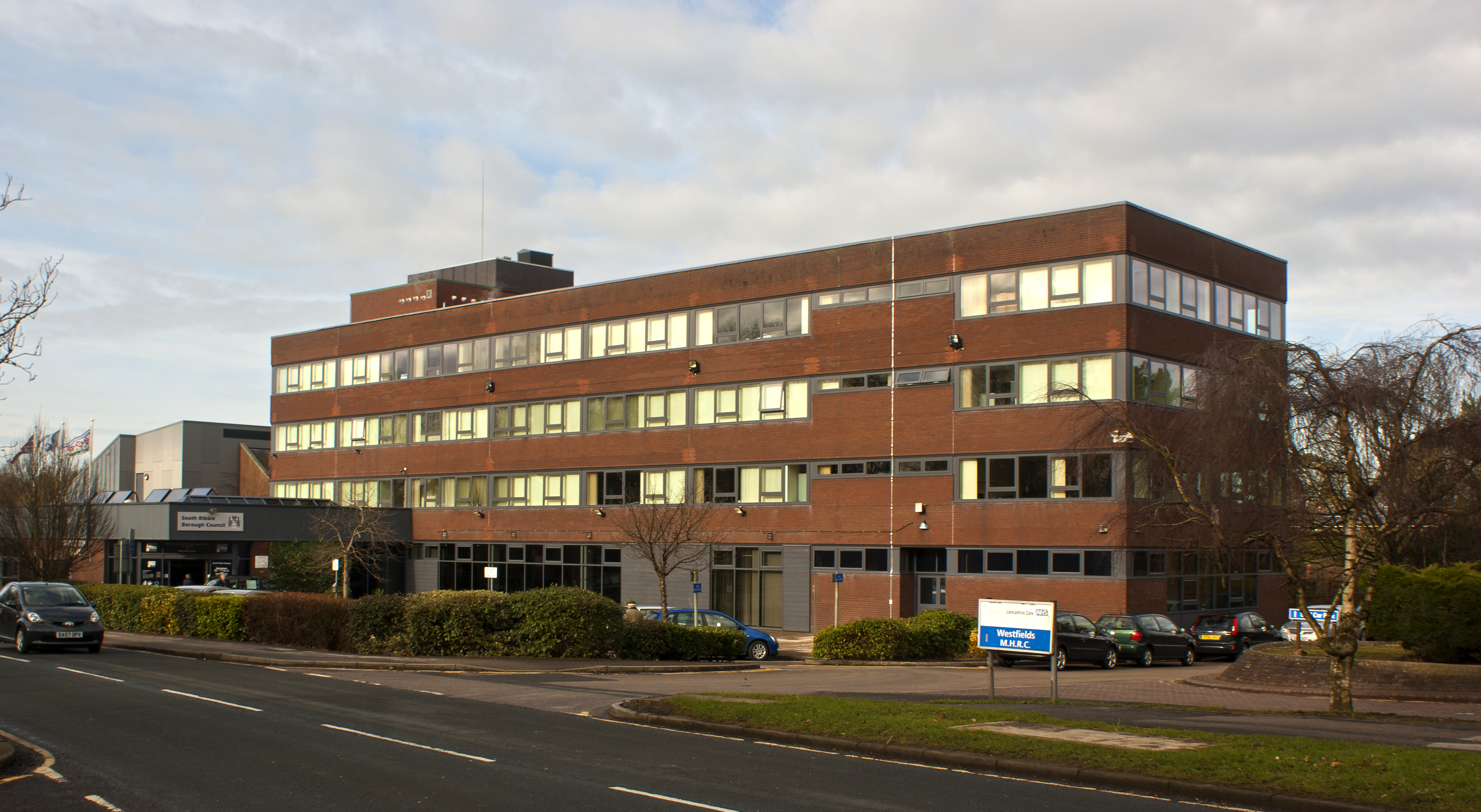
- From left to right; Top: Leyland Motors Clock; Middle: Bamber Bridge and Lostock Hall; Bottom: Penwortham parish church and South Ribble Borough Council offices

- Shown within the ceremonial county of Lancashire
- Sovereign state: United Kingdom
- Constituent country: England
- Region: North West England
- Ceremonial county: Lancashire
- Founded: 1 April 1974
- Admin. HQ: Leyland

Government
  - Type: South Ribble Borough Council
  - MPs: Paul Foster, Maya Ellis

Area
  - Total: 44 sq mi (113 km^{2})
  - Rank: 183rd

Population (2024)
  - Total: 116,113
  - Rank: Ranked 213th
  - Density: 2,660/sq mi (1,030/km^{2})

Ethnicity (2021)
  - Ethnic groups: List: 95.4% White; 2.1% Asian; 1.7% Mixed; 0.5% Black; 0.3% other

Religion (2021)
  - Religion: List: 61.8% Christianity; 30.8% no religion; 5% not stated; 0.9% Islam; 0.7% Hinduism; 0.3% other; 0.2% Buddhism; 0.1% Sikhism; 0.1% Judaism
- Time zone: UTC+0 (Greenwich Mean Time)
  - Summer (DST): UTC+1 (British Summer Time)
- ONS code: 30UN (ONS); E07000126 (GSS)

South Ribble is a local government district with borough status in Lancashire, England. Its council is based in Leyland. The borough includes the towns and villages of Penwortham, Leyland, Farington, Farington Moss, Hutton, Longton, Walmer Bridge, Much Hoole, Coupe Green, Samlesbury, Lostock Hall, Walton-le-Dale and Bamber Bridge. Many of the built-up areas in the borough form part of the wider Preston built-up area.

The neighbouring districts are Preston, Ribble Valley, Blackburn with Darwen, Chorley, West Lancashire and Fylde.

== History ==
The district was formed on 1 April 1974 under the Local Government Act 1972, covering the whole area of two former districts and parts of a third, which were abolished at the same time:

- Leyland Urban District
- Preston Rural District (parishes of Cuerdale, Farington, Hutton, Little Hoole, Longton, Much Hoole, Penwortham and Samlesbury only, rest split between Preston and Ribble Valley)
- Walton-le-Dale Urban District (which included Bamber Bridge)

The new district was named South Ribble, reflecting the fact that the River Ribble forms its northern boundary. The new district was awarded borough status from its creation, allowing the chair of the council to take the title of mayor.

Under current local government reorganisation plans, all district councils in Lancashire, as well as the county council, will be abolished in 2028, with the district becoming part of a new South Lancashire unitary authority.

== Governance ==
South Ribble Borough Council

Type
- Type: Non-metropolitan district

Leadership
- Mayor: Caleb Tomlinson, Labour since 13 May 2026
- Leader: Matthew Tomlinson, Labour since 21 May 2025
- Chief Executive: Chris Sinnott since January 2023

Structure
- Seats: 50 councillors
- Graph of the party split among 50 seats.
- Political groups: Administration (28) Labour (28) Other parties (22) Conservative (16) Liberal Democrats (5) Reform (1)

Elections
- Voting system: Plurality block voting
- Last election: 4 May 2023
- Next election: 6 May 2027

Meeting place
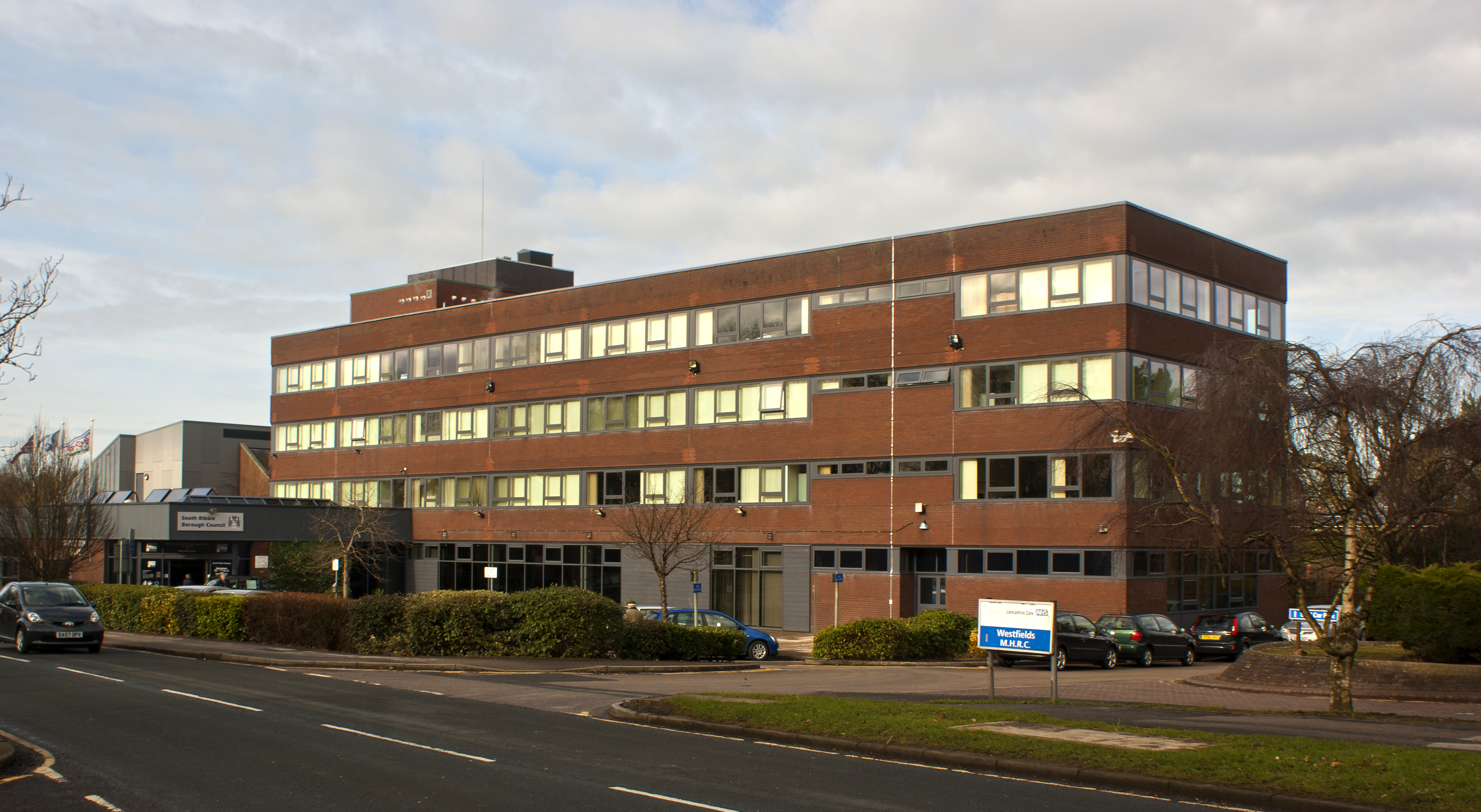
- Civic Centre, West Paddock, Leyland, PR25 1DH

Website
- www.southribble.gov.uk

South Ribble Borough Council provides district-level services. County-level services are provided by Lancashire County Council. Parts of the borough are covered by civil parishes, which form a third tier of local government.

=== Political control ===
The council has been under Labour majority control since the 2023 election.

The first election to the council was held in 1973, initially operating as a shadow authority alongside the outgoing authorities until coming into its powers on 1 April 1974. Since 1974 political control of the council has been as follows:

Party in control	Years
Conservative	1974–1995
Labour	1995–1999
No overall control	1999–2007
Conservative	2007–2019
No overall control	2019–2023
Labour	2023–present

=== Leadership ===
The role of mayor is largely ceremonial in South Ribble. Political leadership is instead provided by the leader of the council. The leaders since 2007 have been:

Councillor	Party	From	To
Margaret Smith	Conservative	2007	20 Jul 2016
Peter Mullineaux	Conservative	15 Sep 2016	17 May 2018
Mary Green	Conservative	17 May 2018	15 Oct 2018
Paul Foster	Labour	15 Oct 2018	1 Nov 2018
Margaret Smith	Conservative	1 Nov 2018	May 2019
Paul Foster	Labour	15 May 2019	17 Jul 2024
Jacky Alty	Labour	17 Jul 2024	21 May 2025
Matthew Tomlinson	Labour	21 May 2025	

=== Composition ===
Following the 2023 election, and subsequent changes of allegiance up to July 2025, the composition of the council was:

Party	Seats
Labour	28
Conservative	16
Liberal Democrats	5
Reform	1
Total	50

The next election is due in 2027.

=== Elections ===
Since the last boundary changes in 2015 the council has comprised 50 councillors representing 23 wards, with each ward electing two or three councillors. Elections are held every four years.

The borough straddles the parliamentary constituencies of Ribble Valley and South Ribble.

=== Premises ===
The council is based at the Civic Centre on West Paddock in Leyland. The building was built in the early 1970s for the former Leyland Urban District Council.

== Parishes ==
There are eight civil parishes in the borough. The parish council for Penwortham has declared its parish to be a town, allowing it to take the style "town council". The parishes of Samlesbury and Cuerdale share a grouped parish council. The former urban districts of Leyland and Walton-le-Dale are unparished areas.

The parishes are:

1. Cuerdale; 2. Farington; 3. Hutton; 4. Little Hoole; 5. Longton; 6. Much Hoole; 7. Penwortham (town); 8. Samlesbury	South Ribble parishes

Places in the Borough of South Ribble

== Twin town ==
South Ribble is twinned with:

- Schleswig-Flensburg, Germany

== Freedom of the Borough ==
The following people and military units have received the Freedom of the Borough of South Ribble.

=== Individuals ===
- Anthony Kelly: September 2010.

=== Military Units ===
- The King's Royal Hussars: 1992.
