= Runshaw College =

College in Lancashire, United Kingdom

- Runshaw College logo
- Type: College
- Established: 1974
- Principal: Clare Russell
- Administrative staff: 850
- Students: 6,000
- Location: Langdale Road, Leyland, PR25 3DQ, England
- Website: www.runshaw.ac.uk

Runshaw College is a Higher and Further Education college based in Leyland, England.

== History ==
=== 1974–2000 ===
Runshaw College was established in 1974. It initially catered solely for school leavers from Balshaw's High School in Leyland, and Parklands High School in Chorley. In its first year the college had 350 students enrolled.

In 1983 it became a tertiary college following a reorganisation by Lancashire's education authority. During the reorganisation the college merged with Leyland Motors Technical College and two other council-run adult education services in Leyland. During this time the college also assumed responsibility for education at Garth Prison and Wymott Prison. Due to the mergers Runshaw's student count grew to 950 students.

In 1995, the college's student numbers grew to 8,463 students, and in 1999 the college opened a campus for adult students in Chorley.

=== 2000–present ===
In 2009, a double-decker bus burst into flames at the college due to an electrical fault behind the driver's seat. The driver and passengers who were waiting for the bus to depart all escaped unharmed.

In 2017, the college's Foxholes restaurant was named the AA College Restaurant of the Year. However, it was later closed in 2019 due to lack of funding.

In 2018, the college became a third-party hate crime reporting centre following a report by lecturers and former students of the college outlining the effectiveness of such programs.

On 4 March 2019, a gang from Manchester came to the college with weapons to attack a student. Staff told police at 10:40am, and officers spotted the gang at 4:00pm. The group ran away from the police out of college grounds and six people were later arrested and convicted. One student was "nicked on the arm" during the attack. A machete was found by police in the nearby Worden Park the day after the attack. The college responded by welcoming the sentencing and installing additional CCTV cameras on the campus.

In May 2022, Runshaw announced that they were beginning Esports as a course, and opened a new Esports centre in 2022 which is fitted with 15 Alienware PCs. Later in June, the college's Ofsted rating was downgraded from Outstanding to Good following concerns over the quality of teaching.

On 5 December 2022, Runshaw announced they would sell their Chorley campus to Lancashire Constabulary and move the courses that were held there to the main Leyland campus. Lancashire Constabulary plan to turn the old campus into a new training centre and operations centre where Chorley's response team, and other specialist teams will be relocated to from the old town centre police station.

On 17 January 2023, Runshaw opened a new building called Buttermere. The building is used to house T Level courses including Digital and Civil Engineering classes and an Architecture Academy which opened in March 2023. Construction began in February 2022. The new building was built by Collinson Construction and cost £3 million. Buttermere is 2-storeys and has an area of 1,000m^{2} for 12 classrooms and a study space. The college submitted a planning application for further construction in 2024, with plans to demolish its old Foxholes Restaurant building and replace it with a two-storey teaching and laboratory building named Windermere being approved.

In 2025, the college was criticised for running a culture day on VE Day.

== Campus ==
Runshaw's current campus in Leyland. It previously hosted only the sixth form portion of the college but now contains both sixth form, adult, and higher education which moved from the Chorley campus when it closed in 2022.

The college has 13 buildings plus a student services centre, three sports courts and a public restaurant alongside the numerous student restaurants. Runshaw's buildings are named after areas of the Lake District. There are currently 11 educational buildings and two student services and study buildings. Dalehead is also the home to the Foxholes restaurant, which closed in 2018 due to budget cuts.

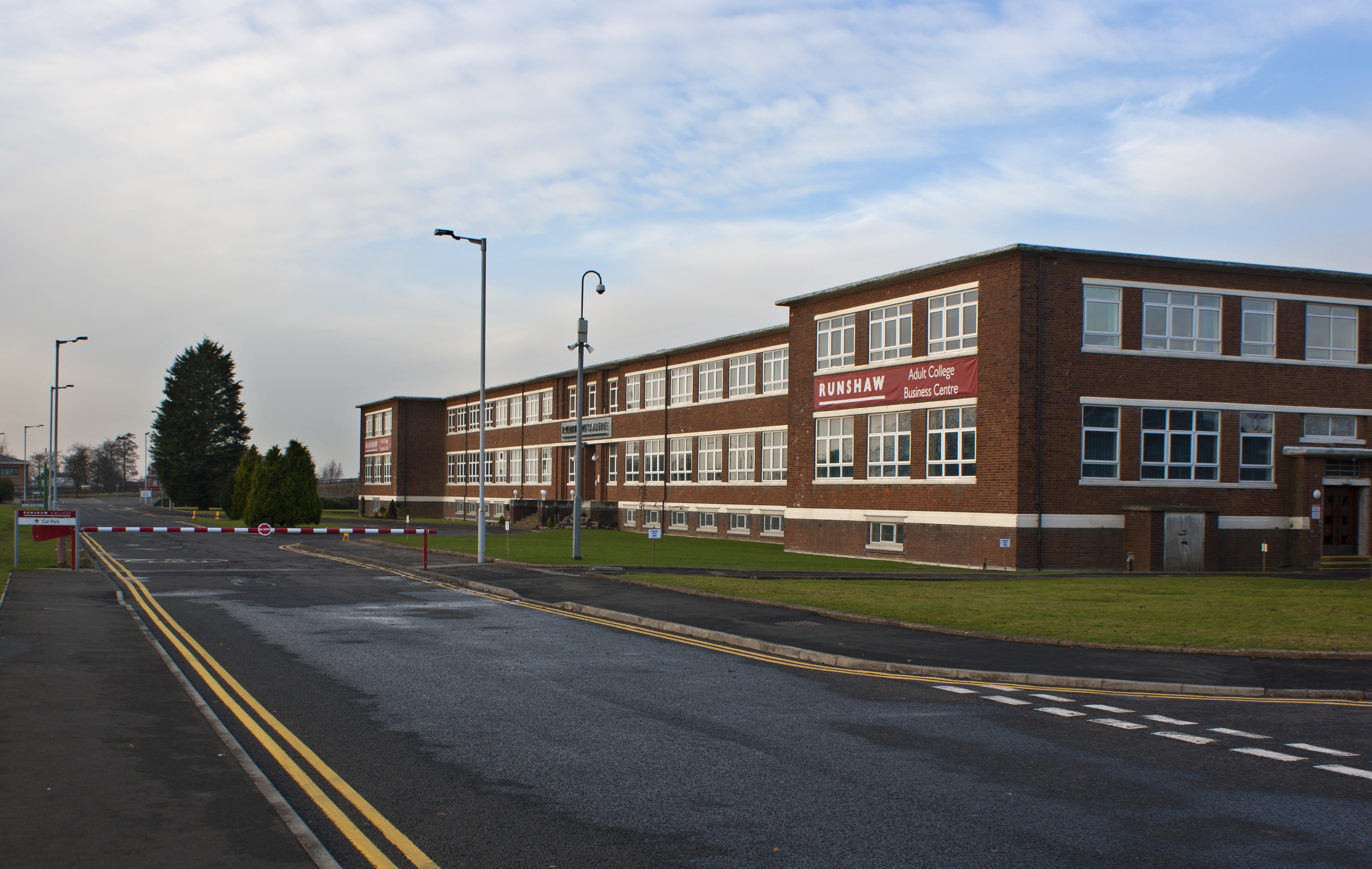
Runshaw's Chorley campus in 2014

== Notable students ==
- Graeme Ballard, Paralympian athlete
- Holly Bradshaw, pole vaulter
- Tom Cahill, footballer
- Lloyd Cole, songwriter was lead singer of Lloyd Cole and the Commotions
- Liv Cooke, professional football freestyler
- Melissa-Jane Daniel, archery world record-holder
- Derek Draper, New Labour political adviser
- Tim Farron, MP for Westmorland and Lonsdale and former leader of the Liberal Democrats
- Joe Gilgun, actor
- Michael Jennings, former British champion welterweight boxer
- Monty Lord, British author
- Rachel McCarthy, scientist, poet and broadcaster
- Steve Pemberton, actor, writer and comedian
- Samantha Robinson, actress
- Amanda Roocroft, opera singer
- Dave Ryding, alpine ski racer
- Kevin Simm and Jessica Taylor, singers with Liberty X
- Tom Smith, England national cricketer
- John Thomson, actor and comedian
- David Unsworth, footballer
