= Rachel McCarthy =

British climatologist and writer (born 1984)

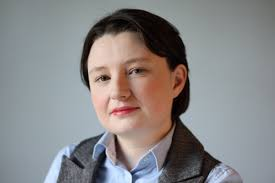
- McCarthy photographed by The Guardian, 2015
- Born: Rachel Elizabeth McCarthy; 31 July 1984 (age 42); Preston, Lancashire, England
- Occupations: Climatologist; poet; essayist; broadcaster
- Years active: 2006–present
- Awards: Laureate's Choice (2015)

Academic background
- Education: Runshaw College
- Alma mater: University College, Durham (BSc); Vrije Universiteit Amsterdam (PhD)

Academic work
- Discipline: Meteorology; Climatology; Literature
- Institutions: Met Office; Department for Energy and Climate Change; IPCC; European Commission
- Notable works: Element (2015)
- Website: www.rachelmccarthy.com

Dr. Rachel McCarthy (born 31 July 1984) is a British climatologist, poet, broadcaster and member of Médecins Sans Frontières.

== Early life and education ==
Rachel Elizabeth McCarthy was born in Preston, Lancashire. She was educated at St Mary's Catholic Primary School in Leyland, St Mary's Catholic High School in Leyland and studied six A-levels at Runshaw College, Leyland. She studied Natural Sciences at Durham University as a member of University College. She graduated in 2006 with triple first class honours in Chemistry, Physics and maths later completing a doctorate in Climatology.

== Career ==
In 2008, she joined the Met Office soon becoming a Senior Climate Scientist, specialising in Climate Impacts and Disaster Risk Reduction. In 2010, she was seconded to London to advise the UK Government Department of Energy and Climate Change on policy matters relating to weather and climate, including renewable energy provision. On her return to the Met Office she worked in the Executive as Private Secretary to the Met Office Chief Scientist Prof. Dame Julia Slingo.. She is the fastest promoted scientist since the organisation's inception in 1854. She was contributor to and editor responsible for the Met office Hadley Centre's contributions to Sir John Houghton's 5th edition of Global Warming:the complete briefing.

== The missing heat problem ==
Simply put, having calculated the amount of carbon in the atmosphere, there is less warming than expected. where is this extra heat? (a common sceptic question used to deny warming). Working together with Prof. Dame Julia Slingo and using data from scientists in the Met Office Hadley Centre, they proposed that the heat was being stored in the deep Pacific and influenced to some extent by the role of the natural phenomenon called the Interdecal Pacific Oscillation (IPO), in its negative phase. Together they wrote three papers on the subject explaining the rationale.

Soon, observations taken in the area of the IPO confirmed Slingo and McCarthy correct, and a slew of papers from other scientists followed.

In 2015 she was appointed as an Expert for the European Commission, to advise on the scientific validity of projects submitted under the EU's H2020 Climate Programme; the biggest EU Research and Innovation programme ever with nearly €80 billion of funding available over 7 years (2014 to 2020).

== Contributions to poetry ==
In 2009 she established ExCite Poetry, the Devon arm of the UK Poetry Society. Within six months of its formation, ExCite Poetry became the largest regional arm of the Poetry Society by a significant margin with well over 200 members and was consequently the focus of the first of a series of poetry workshops with Ruth Padel on BBC Radio 4. Between 2009 and 2013, she co-hosted a monthly arts-review show on Phonic FM, hailed by The Sunday Times as "providing some of the most inspiring broadcasting in the country". In 2013, she became Director of the Exeter Poetry Festival. McCarthy expanded the existing festival to include school children and international poets. Under her Directorship, for the first time the Festival started to make substantial profits.

In 2015 McCarthy won the first Laureate's Choice Award. In 2016 she converted the research behind the book into a one-woman multimedia experience called 'Alphabet of Our Universe' with numerous shows across the UK and an exclusive interview with McCarthy in The Guardian on Alphabet's Oxford premiere.

== Honours and awards ==
In 2015, she was chosen by Poet Laureate Carol Ann Duffy as one of four of the most exciting new voices in British poetry that year. Her first pamphlet "Element" was published in June 2015 by Smith Doorstop under the imprint of Laureate's Choice, taking its impetus from the naming and properties of the transition metals of the periodic table. The Laureates Choice scheme continued for a further four years and to celebrate the culmination of Carol Ann Duffy's tenure as Poet Laureate eight of McCarthy's poems and an interview were published in 'The Laureate's Choice Anthology' in 2019, which anthologised the work of all twenty 'exciting and eclectic new voices in contemporary verse'.

== Published works ==
=== Poetry ===
- Anthologised in The Laureate's Choice Anthology (2019)
- On Preservation (commissioned by Blue Door Press and Poetry in Aldeburgh (2017)).
- Element - Laureate's Choice Award (2015)
- Anthologised in the Poetry Business Book of New Contemporary Poets (2014)
- Survey at 70˚N (2013)
- Mendeleev's Horse, broadcast on BBC Radio 4 (2011)
- Two Followers of Cadmus Devoured by a Dragon (2010)
- Murmuration (2009) commissioned by the Royal National Lifeboat Institution for Anthony Gormley's One and Other project

=== Scientific papers ===
- McCarthy, R., 2015: "Climate Communication: Bringing It All Together" - presented at Our Common Future Under Climate Change Conference, Paris, July 2015",
- Met Office., 2014: "Too hot, too dry, too wet, too cold: Drivers and impacts of seasonal weather in the UK"
- Met Office., 2013: "The recent pause in global warming(3): What are the implications for projections of future warming?"
- Met Office., 2013: "The recent pause in global warming(2): What are the potential causes?"
- Met Office., 2013: "The recent pause in global warming(1): What do the observations tell us?"
- Palin et al., 2013: "Future projections of temperature-related climate change impacts on the railway network of Great Britain", Climatic Change, 120(1- 2), 71-93

=== Articles and essays ===
- Postcard from a Floodplain Near You(Free Word, May 2016).
- A Different Sort of Provocation(The London Magazine, March 2016).
- Climate Variability and Change: Migration and the Changing Concepts of Identity and Home in the Poetry of European Women (Cambridge Scholars, March 2014).
- Weeding Out Success: The Inaugural Ted Hughes Award (The Bookseller, March 2009).
- Midas Touch: What Carol Ann Duffy's Appointment Means for the Laureateship (Poetry News', Summer 2009).
- Great Expectations for Duffy (The Bookseller, May 2009).
- Andrew Motion: Leaving the Laureateship (Pan Macmillan, April 2009).
- On Gender and Poetry (Pan Macmillan, Feb 2009).
