= Balshaw's Church of England High School =

School in Lancashire, England

Balshaw's CE High School

Location
- Church Road; Leyland, Lancashire, PR25 3AH; England; 53.6876°N 2.6862°W

Information
- Type: Comprehensive; voluntary controlled
- Mottoes: Non Sibi Sed Aliis; Not for yourself but for others Aiming at Excellence
- Religious affiliation: Church of England school
- Founded: 1782
- Founder: Richard Balshaw
- Local authority: Lancashire
- Department for Education URN: 119775 Tables
- Ofsted: Reports
- Head teacher: SC Steven Haycocks
- Gender: Mixed
- Age: 11 to 16
- Enrolment: 921
- Colours: Black & White
- Former name: Balshaw's Grammar School
- Diocese: Blackburn
- Website: www.balshaws.org.uk

Balshaw's CE High School is a comprehensive Church of England secondary school located on Church Road in Leyland, England.

== Background ==
It is situated on Church Road in Leyland, England just south of the B5248 in the east of Leyland, close to the West Coast Main Line, and 546 yards (500m) west of the M6.

Balshaw's is part of the Eco-Schools scheme in Lancashire. This meant creating new targets and energy use for better sustainability. On 2 July 2009, the first Eco event held was an "Eco-Day", in which the pupils worked with eco-friendly materials and learnt about how to lead environmentally friendly lifestyles. Further Eco events and projects have been held.

== History ==
=== 1782–1995: early years ===
The school was founded by Richard Balshaw in 1782. He established a high school called Golden Hill - until the 1920s that school was the original school for Balshaw's pupils. In 1922 work started on building a new school on a 5-acre site.

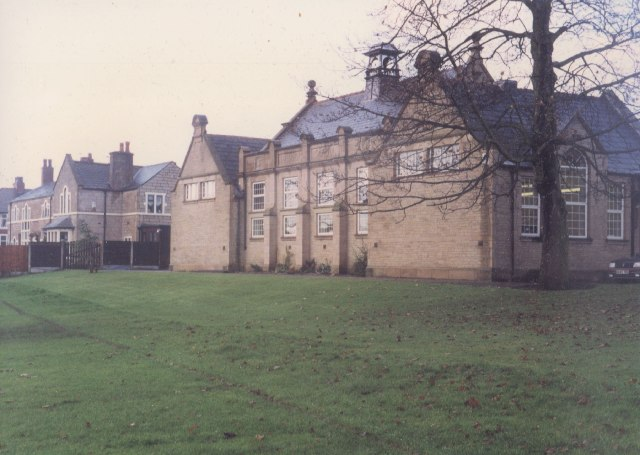
Balshaw's Grammar School

From 1931 until 1972, the school was known as Balshaw's Grammar School. After the abolition of the 11 plus exam in 1972, it became Balshaw's High School.

In 1972 the school partnered with Parklands High School opening Runshaw College, joining to combine both the schools' sixth forms. The school later abandoned its Grammar status in favour of comprehensive status in September 1972, becoming Balshaw's High School. In 1994 the school became a Church of England school.

=== 1995–present: modern day ===
Jo Venn became headteacher of the school in 1995, taking over from Paul Ingram. Venn was the first female headteacher of the school.

On 4 June 2009, the school was inspected by Ofsted and achieved 'Good' status. A further Inspection took place in 2013 where the school was promoted to 'Outstanding' status.

In September 2014, Steven Haycocks became headteacher, making him the first new headteacher in 20 years.

In 2015, the school received backlash after organising a trip to the Las Vegas at the cost of £1,850 per child. Parents claimed the school "left students heartbroken" after parents were unable to cover the costs of the trip.

In 2019, the school received a phone call from an unknown person reporting a hoax bomb threat. The school entered into its lockdown procedures and armed police attended to escort students off the grounds. The school and police later responded stating that the threat was a hoax and they are making attempts to find the perpetrator.

In February 2023, following an Ofsted inspection, the school was downgraded to a status of ‘Good’.

== Notable former pupils ==
- Marcus Bleasdale, photo journalist
- Clarke Carlisle footballer for Burnley F.C., achieving 10 A-grades at GCSE
- Liv Cooke, media personality
- Bryn Hargreaves, rugby league player
- Danny Mayor, footballer
- Chris Tuson, rugby league player
- Phil Jones, footballer for Manchester United F.C.(formerly Blackburn Rovers F.C.)
- Amy Evans, artist

=== Balshaw's Grammar School ===
- Ian Bleasdale, TV actor
- Sir John Lawton, Chief Executive from 1999 to 2005 of the Natural Environment Research Council

=== Leyland Grammar School ===
- Thomas Walker (Australian politician)
