= Listed buildings in Leyland, Lancashire =

Leyland is a town in the South Ribble district of Lancashire, England. It contains 46 buildings that are recorded in the National Heritage List for England as designated listed buildings. Of these, three are listed at Grade II*, the middle grade, and the others are at Grade II, the lowest grade. The listed buildings include churches and associated structures, houses, farmhouses and farm buildings, schools, a public house, and almshouses.

== Key ==
Grade	Criteria
II*	Particularly important buildings of more than special interest
II	Buildings of national importance and special interest

== Buildings ==
Name and location	Photograph	Date	Notes	Grade
Carved stones on pedestal 53.68853°N 2.69652°W	—	Medieval	This consists of two rectangular fragments of carved stone cemented together, their depictions including a torso, letters, and a star. They are mounted on a pedestal with a stone plaque inscribed with the names of the churchwardens and the date 1759.	II
Stone cross 53.68882°N 2.69801°W		Medieval	The stone cross was restored in 1877. It consists of two square steps, and a tall, tapering shaft incorporating part of the original octagonal shaft. This is surmounted by a cross.	II
St Andrew's Church; 53.68877°N 2.69631°W		14th century	The oldest part of the church is the chancel, the west tower was added in the 15th century and the nave in 1817. The roof was replaced in the 1950s. The church is in stone, the roof of the chancel is in stone-slate, and the roof of the nave in copper sheet. The tower is in four stages, with buttresses, a west doorway, clock faces, gargoyles, and an embattled parapet. The nave also has an embattled parapet. Inside the church are galleries on three sides.	II*
Walker Monument; 53.68858°N 2.69603°W		1588 (probable)	The monument is in the churchyard of St Andrew's Church and commemorates William Walker, parish clerk, who died in 1588. It is in sandstone, and consists of a rectangular slab on a stone base. On the slab is the incised life-sized figure of a man, and this is surrounded by a continuous inscription on four sides in English. Also on the slab are two more inscriptions in Latin.	II*
Old Grammar School and master's house 53.68892°N 2.69531°W		Late 16th or early 17th century	The building has been converted into a museum. It is timber-framed on a stone plinth, later encased in brick with stone quoins, and it has a slate roof. Both the school and the house have two storeys, the school having four bays, and the house one. The windows are mullioned. The current entrance is through a doorway in the former house, above which is an inscribed lintel. Inside, much timber framing has been retained.	II
Malt Kiln House; 53.68625°N 2.72973°W	—	17th century or earlier (probable)	A cruck-framed house with brick cladding and a thatched roof. It has two storeys and two-bays, and has casement windows. Inside the house are two full cruck trusses, and timber-framed walls with wattle and daub infill.	II
Wade Hall Farmhouse; 53.68440°N 2.71608°W	—	17th century or earlier	The house was altered probably in the 19th century. It is timber-framed on a stone plinth, later encased in brick and rendered, and has a slate roof. There are two storeys and three bays, and the windows are casements. There is an outshut and single-storey extension at the rear. Inside the house substantial timber-framing remains.	II
Worden Old Hall; 53.68272°N 2.66461°W		c. 1620 (possible)	A timber-framed former manor house, later encased partly in stone but mainly in brick, and with a slate roof in two storeys. It originally had a rectangular seven-bay plan, and later an extension with four gables was added to the front. On the front is a round-headed porch. Internally the timber-framing has almost completely survived, much of it with wattle and daub infill.	II*
Atherton Hall; 53.68127°N 2.68580°W		Early 17th century	The house is partly timber-framed and partly in brick, on a stone plinth and with a slate roof. It has two storeys and a T-shaped plan, consisting of a main range and a cross wing, the latter probably being the earlier. In the centre of the main range is a doorway with an inscribed lintel and a modern single-storey gabled porch. The windows are casements. Inside the house is a large bressumer.	II
Peacock Hall; 53.68806°N 2.71665°W		1626	A house, later divided into three dwellings, in brick with a stone plinth and large long-and-short quoins, and with a stone-slate roof. It has two storeys and a U-shaped plan, consisting of a central two-bay range and two projecting gabled wings. There is also an extension at the rear. In the right bay of the central range is a doorway with large jambs and a lintel, above which is a datestone. All the windows on the front have been altered, and the hood moulds are in brick. At the rear, some of the windows are mullioned. Inside the house are two bressumers.	II
Dunkirk Hall; 53.69133°N 2.72320°W		1628	A house, later converted into a public house, in brick on a stone plinth and with stone dressings, and with a concrete tile roof. There are three bays, and two storeys with an attic. On the front is a three-storey gabled porch that has large quoins, a moulded doorcase, and an inscribed lintel. The windows are mullioned. Inside some of the timber-framed partitions have remained.	II
Firs Farmhouse; 53.68436°N 2.71754°W	—	17th century	A brick house with stone quoins and dressings and a slate roof. There are two storeys with an attic, and it is in an L-shaped plan with a two-bay main range and a two-bay receding cross wing. There is also a later extension at the rear. The doorway is plain, some of the windows are mullioned, and others are sashes. Inside the house are timber-framed partitions.	II
Old Hall; 53.69415°N 2.69029°W	—	1660	A brick house, later converted into two dwellings, it is pebbledashed with some timber-framing, rendered quoins, and a stone-slate roof. The house has two storeys, and is in an L-shaped plan, with a main range of three bays, and a cross wing of two bays. There are modern single-storey extensions at the rear. The house has a two-storey porch with a datestone. Most of the windows are mullioned or mullioned and transomed. Inside the building is an inglenook bressumer.	II
Sherdley gravestone 53.68867°N 2.69600°W	—	1687	The gravestone is in the churchyard of St Andrew's Church and commemorates Richard Sherdley. It consists of a raised stone slab on a low stone base, and contains a long inscription in relief.	II
Heald House; 53.68811°N 2.67940°W	—	1706	The house was altered in the 19th century. It is in brick, mostly rendered, on a stone plinth and with a roof of blue tiles. The house has two storeys with an attic, and a symmetrical three-bay front. It has an arched wooden porch, a doorway that has pilastered jambs and a semicircular fanlight, above which is a decorative datestone. The windows are all sashes. There are three gabled dormers, and on the right return is a canted bay window.	II
4 Nixon's Court; 53.69025°N 2.74339°W	—	1719	Originally a farmhouse, it is in brick with some stone quoins on a stone plinth, and with a stone-slate roof. There are two storeys with an attic, and a symmetrical two-bay front. On the front is a 2 1/2-storey gabled porch that has an outer doorway with a rusticated surround, a segmental head, and an inscribed lintel. The windows have been altered, and in the attic are gabled half-dormers. Inside the house are an inglenook and bressumers.	II
9 Towngate; 53.68886°N 2.69822°W		Early 18th century (probable)	Originally one or two houses, the building was later amended for other uses. It is in rendered brick with a slate roof. There are three storeys and two bays, with shop fronts in the ground floor. The middle floor contains tall windows, and in the top floor are square windows. The doors have stone architraves. Inside, there are timber-framed partition walls.	II
2 Worden Lane; 53.68841°N 2.69830°W	—	Early 18th century	A rendered house, probably on brick, with a slate roof. It has three storeys and an extension at the rear. The windows on the ground and middle floors are sashes, and in the top floor they are casements. The doorcase has pilasters and an open pediment. Inside the house is extensive timber-framing.	II
Langs Hall; 53.69276°N 2.71710°W	—	Early 18th century (probable)	Originally a farmhouse, later extended, and subsequently divided into two dwellings. The original part is in rendered brick with a slate roof, and it has some internal timber-framing. This part has two storeys and two bays with a rear extension. There is a two-storey porch, and the windows are replaced casements. The extension is a projecting cross wing to the left, it has two storeys with an attic, and a projecting two-storey canted bay window with Venetian-shaped windows, and a diocletian window in the attic.	II
Sundial; 53.68875°N 2.69539°W	—	Early 18th century (probable)	The sundial is in the churchyard of St Andrew's Church. It is in stone, and consists of a baluster-shaped pedestal on two circular steps, with a moulded base and cap. On the top is a brass plate and a scrolled gnomon.	II
Eagle and Child Inn; 53.68886°N 2.69458°W		18th century (probable)	A public house in pebbledashed brick on a stone plinth, with stone quoins and stone-slate roofs. There are two storeys in three different heights, and the building has a rectangular plan in four bays, with another bay set back at the left. There are two doors with stone jambs and entablatures, some of the windows are casements, and others are sashes.	II
Barn, Worden Hall; 53.68241°N 2.70206°W		18th century	The barn ha been converted into a performance space. It is in brick on a stone plinth, with stone dressings, including quoins, and a slate roof. The building has a rectangular plan with four bays, and contains opposed wagon entrances that have segmental heads with voussoirs, and five rows of ventilation openings.	II
Brew house, Worden Hall; 53.68240°N 2.70252°W	—	18th century (probable)	The former building for brewing animal food is in brick with stone dressings and has a slate roof. It has two storeys and a rectangular four-bay plan. On the south side are four doorways, and there are three windows on each floor. In the gable ends are loft doors, one of which is reached by external steps.	II
Service wing, Worden Hall; 53.68230°N 2.70221°W	—	18th century	The service wing to a former country house is in brick on a stone plinth, with stone dressings and a slate roof. It has two storeys and an L-shaped plan. The higher west wing has five bays, and the south wing has two. The windows are in varying types, and include cross windows, mullioned windows, a French window and a stair window, and the doorway is round-headed.	II
Stable block, Worden Hall; 53.68241°N 2.70181°W	—	18th century (probable)	The former stable is in brick with stone quoins and a slate roof. It has two storeys and is in a roughly square plan. The wide doorways, with stone jambs and lintels have been converted into windows, and there is a first-floor loft door.	II
Cliff's Farmhouse; 53.67979°N 2.71830°W	—	1760	A brick house, rendered at the front and rear, with rusticated quoins and a red tiled roof. It has two storeys and a symmetrical two-bay front. The doorcase is pedimented and above it is a datestone. The windows are square with splayed heads and keystones. At the rear is a tall stair window.	II
Arch over Wade Brook; 53.68034°N 2.69879°W		Late 18th century (probable)	A stone round-headed arch crossing a waterfall, with quoins and voussoirs. Adjoining it to the south is a rectangular turret with a gargoyle, and to the north is part of a broken arch.	II
St Mary's School; 53.69750°N 2.69864°W	—	1784	The school was altered and enlarged in 1816. It is in stone with a stone-slate roof in two storeys. The building has an L-shaped plan, with a front of five bays, and an attached master's house, and there is an extension at the rear. The original doorway has been converted into a window, and above it is an inscribed rectangular stone tablet. The windows are Venetian-shaped. The master's house has a projecting gabled bay.	II
Line of fence posts 53.68505°N 2.72274°W	—	1785	The fence posts divide a meadow between the River Lostock and the Wade Brook. There are 35 stone posts on a line 100 metres (330 ft) long. The posts are tapered slabs about 1.5 metres (4 ft 11 in) high with two slots for railings.	II
10 Worden Lane; 53.68806°N 2.69820°W	—	Late 18th or early 19th century	A brick house with stone dressings and a slate roof. It has two storeys, an attic and a basement, and a symmetrical front of five bays. In the centre is a doorcase with three-quarter Doric columns, an open pediment, and a semicircular fanlight. All the windows are sashes, and there is a semicircular attic window in the left return.	II
Ice house, Worden Hall; 53.68082°N 2.70224°W	—	Late 18th or early 19th century (probable)	The ice house is in the grounds of the former hall. Its entrance is blocked with brick. The masonry around it has an ogee-shaped head, and is decorated with re-set items of carved stones dating from the 16th century or earlier. These include two small statues, three faces, and shields.	II
10–60 Fox Lane; 53.68842°N 2.70009°W		c. 1800–02	A row of 26 houses in brick with stone dressings and slate roofs. They have two storeys and basement workshops beneath. The houses are approached by steps, and have a doorway, a window to the left, and two windows in the top floor, all with stone splayed heads, and most are sashes. The basements have separate entrances down steps, with a doorway and two windows at the front. At the rear are additional entrances to the basements, stairlight windows, and most of the other windows are casements.	II
Watch house 53.68872°N 2.69523°W	—	Early 19th century	The watch house is in the churchyard of St Andrew's Church. It is in ashlar with a slate roof, and consists of a single-storey rectangular cell. The building contains an arched window and a plain doorway with an arched lintel.	II
Entrance gateway and lodge, Worden Hall; 53.68599°N 2.69777°W		Early 19th century	The gateway and lodge are in ashlar. The gateway consists of a round-headed arch with vermicular rustication. It has a scrolled keystone, attached Tuscan columns, and a plain entablature with a moulded cornice and a stepped parapet. Between the arch and the lodge is a postern gate. The lodge is in Neoclassical style, it has a single storey and is in a T-shaped plan. The roof is in slate, and the lodge has pedimented gables, rusticated quoins, and sash windows with architraves.	II
Gateway and boundary wall 53.68891°N 2.69693°W		1827	The gateway and wall, all in stone, form part of the boundary to the churchyard of St Andrew's Church. The gateway has a wide Tudor arch with battlemented coping between piers that are also battlemented. The wall extends for about 100 metres (330 ft) to the east, and has iron railings that have Gothic arches with urn finials.	II
St Andrews Church of England School; 53.68809°N 2.70091°W		1837	The school, later used as a nursery, is in stone with a slate roof, and is in Jacobean style. It has a single storey and is in an F-shaped plan, with two unequal gabled projections to the front. The windows are mullioned or mullioned and transomed with hood moulds. To the left is a gable porch with a ball finial, and in the left gable is an inscribed plaque.	II
102–112 Fox Lane; 53.68799°N 2.70414°W		1849	A group of six almshouses, replacing buildings of 1649. They are in brick on a stone plinth with sandstone quoins and a slate roof. They are in a single storey, and consists of a central range of four cottages, and two cottages in projecting gabled wings. Above the two central doors is an inscribed stone plaque, and above the other doorways are sandstone plaques carved with different shields. The windows are mullioned, and the gables contain applied timber-framing. At the rear is a continuous outshut.	II
78 Towngate; 53.69099°N 2.69733°W		Mid 19th century	Originally a police station, later used for other purposes, it is in brick on a stone plinth, and has ashlar dressings, including rusticated quoins, and a hipped slate roof. There are two storeys, it has an L-shaped plan, and a front of four bays. The central two bays project slightly forward and contain a Tuscan pilastrade with a lettered frieze. All the windows are sashes.	II
St James' Church; 53.68998°N 2.73249°W		1854–55	The church was designed by Ewan Christian in Early English style, and the south aisle was added in 1872. It is in stone with a slate roof, and consists of a nave, aisles with separate ridges, a north porch, a chancel, and a west steeple. The steeple has a tower with buttresses and a broach spire. The windows contain plate tracery. Inside the church, the east wall has a blind arcade, the central panels of which are decorated.	II
United Reformed Church and walls 53.69561°N 2.69361°W		1874–77	Originally a Congregational Church with a school and a hall, it was designed by David Grant in High Victorian Gothic style. The church is in Padiham and Longridge stone, the school and hall are in brick and stone, and all have slate roofs. The church consists of a nave, a chancel with an apse, vestries, and a tower with a saddleback roof. To the right of the tower is a vestibule incorporating a stair tower. Included in the listing are the walls enclosing the forecourt of the church	II
92 Fox Lane; 53.68806°N 2.70293°W	—	Late 19th century	A brick cottage with a slate roof, built as part of the Farington Almshouse Trust. It has a single storey with an attic, and a symmetrical front. The cottage has a central gabled porch with a round-headed opening, and two gabled dormers; all the gables have wavy bargeboards and finials. The windows are casements.	II
94, 96 and 98 Fox Lane; 53.68803°N 2.70330°W		Late 19th century	A row of three cottages, built as part of the Farington Almshouse Trust, in brick with slate roofs. They are in a single storey with attics, and have symmetrical fronts. Each cottage has a central gabled porch with a round-headed opening, and there are four gabled dormers; all the gables have wavy bargeboards and finials. The windows are casements.	II
100 Fox Lane; 53.68800°N 2.70369°W	—	Late 19th century	A brick cottage with a slate roof, built as part of the Farington Almshouse Trust. It has a single storey with an attic, and a symmetrical front. The cottage has a central gabled porch with a round-headed opening, and two gabled dormers; all the gables have wavy bargeboards and finials. The windows are casements.	II
St Ambrose's Church; 53.69828°N 2.68314°W		1884–85	A stone church with a green slate roof and red ridge tiles, with features of Early English and French Gothic styles. It consists of a nave with a clerestory, aisles, a north porch, a chancel with a north transept and a south chapel, and a west tower. The tower is in three stages with buttresses, a round stair tower with a conical roof, tall lancet bell openings, octagonal pinnacles, and a hexagonal pyramidal roof. The porch is gabled and has a crocketed canopy and a central corbel.	II
St Mary's Church; 53.69204°N 2.70489°W		1962–64	The Catholic church is in brick and reinforced concrete, and has copper-covered roofs. It is circular with aisles, a projecting entrance, and five projecting chapels, and a central white altar. It was designed by Jerzy Faczynski, with the Stations of the Cross by Arthur Dooley, and the stained glass in the ambulatory by Patrick Reyntiens.	II
Tower of St Mary's Church; 53.69260°N 2.70530°W	—	1962–64	The tower is a detached campanile in reinforced concrete. It has four piers in five stages that rise and taper to form a cross. The fourth stage is solid with irregular windows, and above is a bell.	II

== Former listed buildings ==
Name and location	Photograph	Date	Notes	Grade
Conservatory, Worden Hall; 53.68209°N 2.70245°W		Mid 19th century (probable)	Originally a conservatory attached to the hall, later used as a greenhouse, it has a wooden frame on a stone plinth, and glazed walls and roof. There are three sections, the central section being higher, with a projecting canted bay and double doors. The outer sections have a simple structure. On the apices of the bay and the gables are iron finials. The conservatory was de-listed in 2017.	II
