= John Fishwick & Sons =

Bus operator in Lancashire, England

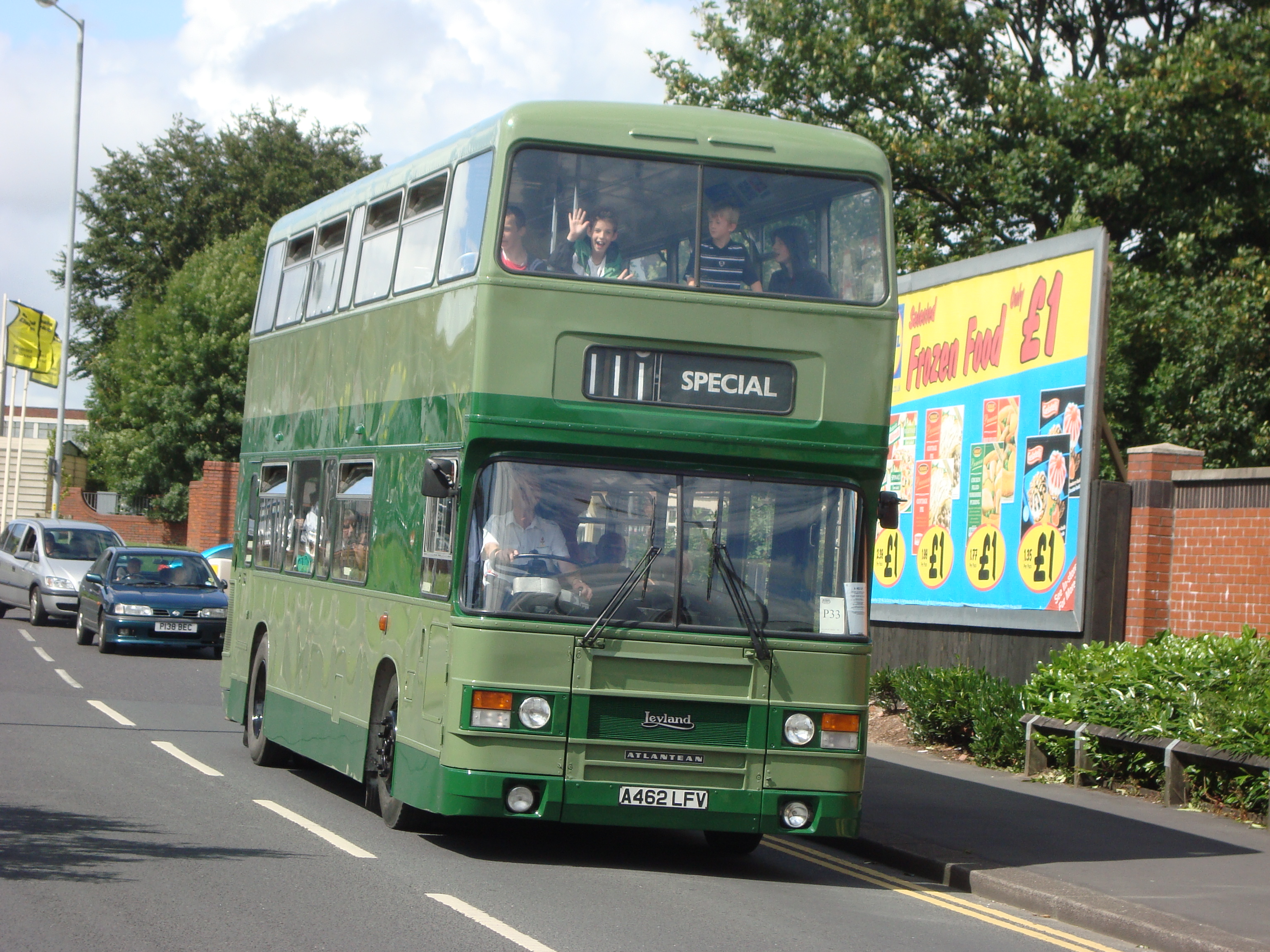
- Eastern Coach Works bodied Leyland Atlantean AN69 (cancelled export)
- Parent: John Brindle; James Fishwick Hustler
- Founded: 1907
- Defunct: 24 October 2015
- Headquarters: Leyland
- Service area: Lancashire
- Service type: Bus & coach services
- Fleet: 37 (October 2014)
- Website: www.fishwicks.co.uk

John Fishwick & Sons was a bus company based in Leyland, Lancashire.

== History ==
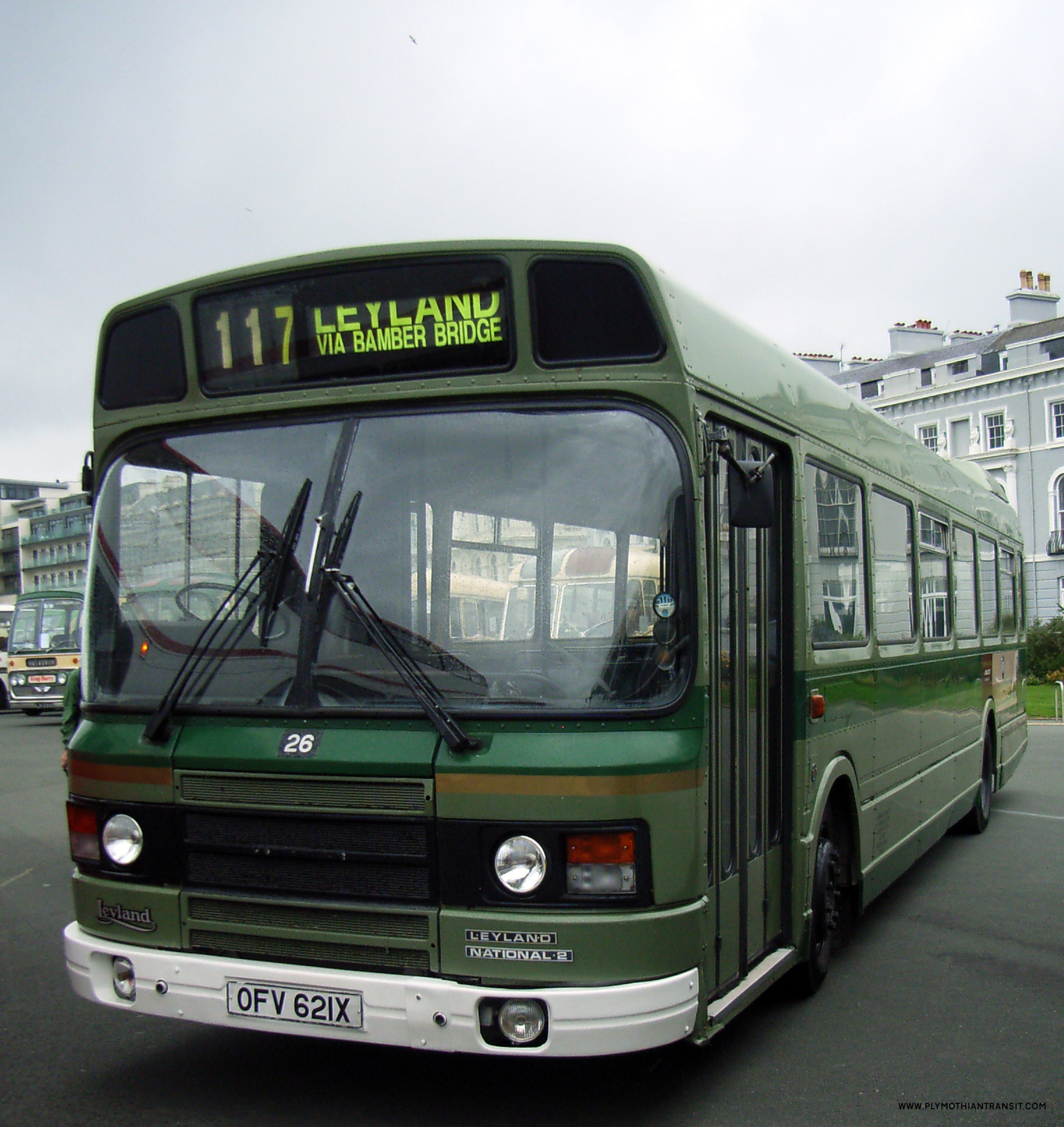
Preserved Leyland National in Plymouth in July 2009

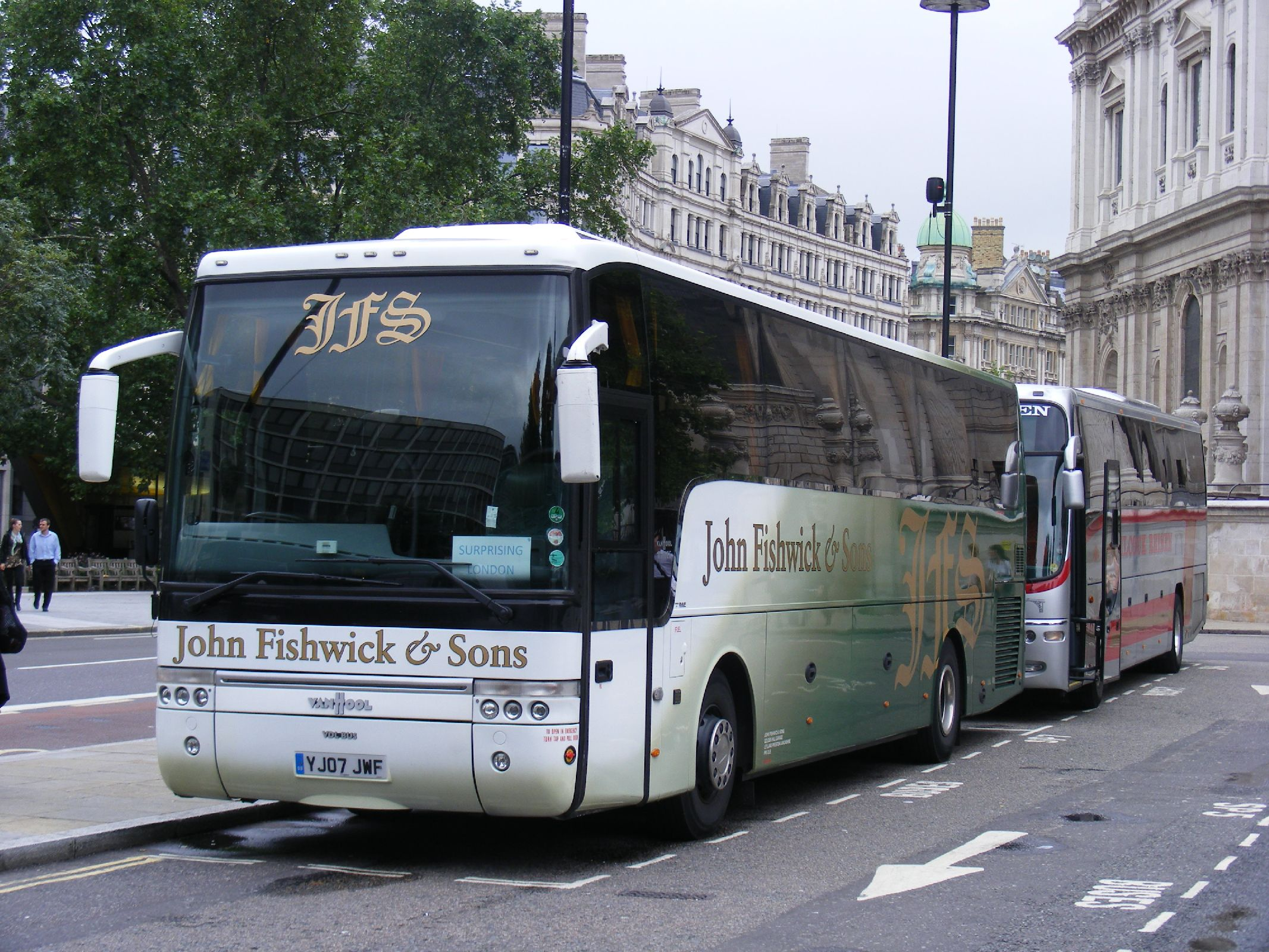
Van Hool Alizee T9 bodied VDL in August 2010

The company was formed in 1907 when John Fishwick moved from Wales to Leyland looking for business. He started with a steam propelled wagon from the local Leyland Motors factory in Farington. The vehicle was used to transport goods for local business until 1910 when a second petrol vehicle was bought and converted to a bus to be used to ferry passengers from Leyland to nearby Preston.

After World War I, the fleet expanded and by the early 1930s the fleet consisted of eight wagons and 25 buses. During the 1950s the haulage side of the business declined and was disposed of in 1953. The company then focused solely on passenger transport and took over all of its local rivals. By the end of the 1960s the fleet had grown to over 35 buses and 11 coaches.

John Fishwick & Sons ceased trading on 24 October 2015 after entering administration.

== Services ==
As of 2015 John Fishwick & Sons operated four bus routes: the 109, 111, 115 and 119, connecting Leyland with Chorley, Preston, Penwortham and Moss Side.

== Fleet ==
As at October 2014 the fleet consisted of 37 buses and coaches. John Fishwick & Sons also maintained a heritage fleet.

== See also ==
- List of bus operators of the United Kingdom
