= Occleshaw =

Occleshaw may refer to:

- Ian Occleshaw (1928–2015), Australian professional tennis player and coach
- Occleshaw House, 18th-century building in Lancashire, England
