= Tom Smith (cricketer, born 1985) =

English cricketer (born 1985)

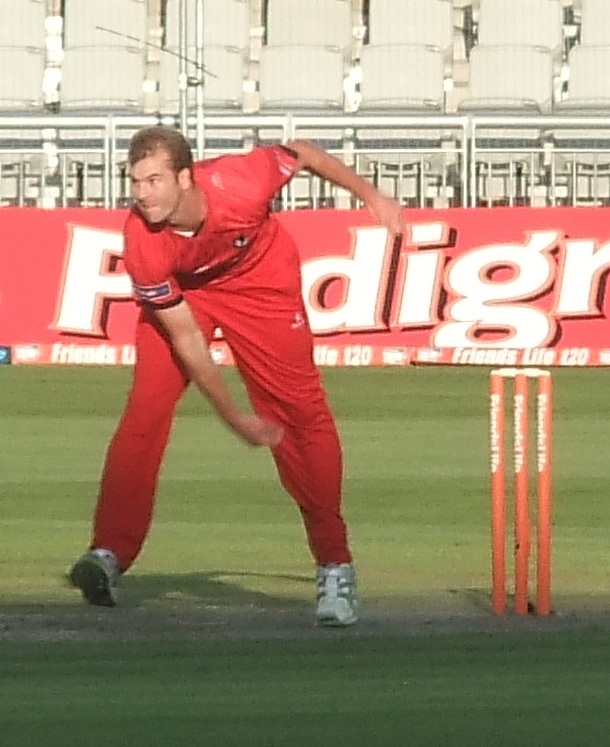

Personal information
- Full name: Thomas Christopher Smith
- Born: 26 December 1985 (age 40); Liverpool, England
- Nickname: Smudger
- Height: 6 ft 3 in (1.91 m)
- Batting: Left-handed
- Bowling: Right-arm medium
- Role: All-rounder

Domestic team information
- Years: Team
- 2005–2017: Lancashire (squad no. 24)
- 2008: → Leicestershire (on loan)
- 2011/12: Matabeleland Tuskers

Career statistics
Competition	FC	LA	T20
Matches	107	73	96
Runs scored	3,972	1,635	2,113
Batting average	29.42	32.70	27.80
100s/50s	3/26	2/11	0/11
Top score	128	117	92*
Balls bowled	13,431	2,700	1,229
Wickets	241	84	51
Bowling average	28.56	28.38	31.84
5 wickets in innings	7	0	0
10 wickets in match	0	0	0
Best bowling	6/46	4/48	3/12
Catches/stumpings	112/–	24/–	42/–
- Source: CricketArchive, 25 January 2017

Thomas Christopher Smith (born 26 December 1985) is a former English cricketer who played for Lancashire County Cricket Club. He had also been a member of the England Academy team. In 2008, he played for Leicestershire on loan because he was unable to break into Lancashire's first team. He is an all-rounder, bowling right-arm medium and batting left-handed. At the start of the 2009 season, Smith was promoted to open the batting, having previously batted in the lower order, and secured his place there. In 2011, the year Lancashire won the County Championship for the first time since 1950, Smith became the first Lancashire player to score a century and take four wickets in the same one-day match. In 2011/12 Smith played for the Matabeleland Tuskers in Zimbabwe as an overseas player in the domestic twenty20 competition.

== Career ==
=== Breakthrough ===
Smith started out at his local team Withnell Fold at an early age.

[Smith] is a nagging seamer with the ability to bring the ball back into the right-handers and has already made a habit of bowling batsmen when they leave the ball. He has talent with the bat, too, although this has yet to be fully realised.

Smith received the NBC Denis Compton Award for the most promising Lancashire player in 2005 and 2006. His Lancashire debut came late in 2005, but he made his big breakthrough in 2006. Smith previously attended Parklands High School in Chorley and Runshaw College in Leyland and played for cricket clubs in Withnell Fold and Chorley Cricket Club.

=== Leicestershire loan ===
Late in April 2008, Smith suffered a thigh injury which prevented him from playing for seven weeks. In late June 2008, Smith signed a contract with Leicestershire – who were in the second division of the County Championship – to play on loan from Lancashire for a month. Lancashire had a full strength bowling attack – including Andrew Flintoff and James Anderson who had returned from England duty – and Smith was unable to break into the side. Smith explained that "I am Lancashire born and bred and I want to play for Lancashire for all of my career. I'm just going to get some cricket and make sure I am ticking over well". He was immediately drafted into the Leicestershire side.

In 6 first-class matches for Leicestershire, Smith scored 228 at an average of 32.57 – including one half-century – and took 13 wickets at an average of 38.23; in the 3 one-day matches he played for Leicestershire, Smith scored 62 runs at 31.00 – including a half-century – and took 4 wickets at 33.00. While playing for Leicestershire, Smith scored his maiden first-class and one-day half-centuries. Batting at number 8 against Warwickshire at the start of August 2008, Smith scored 63, beating his previous highest score of 49. On 3 August, Smith scored 52 against Yorkshire while batting at number 6, beating his previous best one-day score of 30.

=== Opening batsman ===
On his return to Lancashire from Leicestershire, manager Mike Watkinson was impressed by Smith's performances with the bat and ball. Smith's contract with the club was renewed, along with nine other young players who were expected to form the basis of Lancashire's squad in the future. Smith stated his intent to cement his place in the Lancashire side as an all-rounder, saying that "My batting has come on in leaps and I would like to think of myself as more of an allrounder. I batted in the top six at Leicestershire in the limited-over games and at seven in the four-dayers, and I got 50-plus a couple of times and had a run average of about 40. After the responsibility there I know I can do it."

In Lancashire's opening first-class match of the 2009 season, Smith scored his maiden century. In a match against Durham University, he opened the batting in the second innings and scored 104 runs from 166 balls, beating his previous highest first-class score of 63. Following this successful innings, Smith was again promoted to open the innings with Kyle Hogg in a one-day match against Glamorgan. With Mal Loye absent with a calf injury, Smith scored 66 runs from 90 balls – beating his previous best listA score of 52 – as Lancashire won by 80 runs. Originally a stop-gap opener, when Loye recovered from injury in early June, Smith's success at the top of the order initially kept him out of the team, and even when Loye secured a place in the side again Smith remained as opener.

In mid-June, Smith suffered a side strain which prevented him from playing for six weeks. By this point of the season, Smith had experienced success as an opener in the limited-over matches, scoring half centuries in one-day and Twenty20 matches, although his batting average in first-class matches was a disappointing 8.50 from four matches. Moores backed Smith to succeed in the long form of the game, stating "We've backed Tom to do it because it balances our team and he has shown he is a very good player. I think we've seen that in the one-day stuff. I think Tom is playing well. You judge a player on how he's playing. Tom's developing and learning quickly. Technically, he stands up tall and plays up the ground which is what you want your openers to do".

During a Roses Match in late July, Smith took career best figures of 6/46, his maiden first-class five-wicket haul. Smith and Paul Horton then proceeded to share in their highest opening partnership in the County Championship. After the match, Smith commented "I am really enjoying the opening role. In one-day cricket especially it is great, but opening in any form of the game I am enjoying". Moores' faith in Smith's batting was further repaid in a match against Hampshire, when Smith scored 95; however, in the match Smith suffered a stomach strain. This coincided with injuries to Glen Chapple, Steven Cheetham, and Sajid Mahmood and with Andrew Flintoff and James Anderson on England duty, Lancashire's bowling attack was severely depleted. As a stop-gap measure, Tom Lungley was loaned by Lancashire from Derbyshire County Cricket Club.

At the start of the 2010 season, Smith managed just 24 runs from his first six innings opening for Lancashire. Consequentially, he was moved to the middle order, where he rediscovered his form. In his second match after moving down the order, Smith scored his maiden century in the County Championship. After his success, he stated that he would like to regain the opening position. Despite struggling for runs in first-class cricket at the start of the season, Smith was Lancashire's leading run-scorer in T20 cricket in 2010 with 543 runs from 17 matches, nearly 150 runs more than his nearest competitor, Steven Croft. While Lancashire was knocked out in the quarter-finals of the competition, Smith scored three half-centuries including a personal best of 92 not out against Worcestershire; he finished as the competition's fourth-highest run-scorer for 2010. Smith also claimed 13 wickets in the T20 competition. In June 2010, Smith reached the landmark of 100 first-class wickets when he dismissed Jonny Bairstow in a drawn Roses match. At the start of August, Smith was awarded his county cap by Lancashire.

Lancashire failed to progress beyond the group stages of the 2011 CB40 but in their final match of the competition Smith scored his maiden one-day century (117). In same match he took 4/48 to help his side to a two-run over Nottinghamshire, and in the process became the first Lancashire player to score a century and take four wickets in a one-day match. In the final match of the season, Lancashire won the County Championship for the first time since 1950. With the English cricket season concluded, in November Smith travelled to Zimbabwe to play for the Matabeleland Tuskers in the country's domestic twenty20 competition, the Stanbic Bank 20 Series. In seven matches for the Tuskers he scored 145 runs with a single half-century, and took three wickets while conceding 203 runs.

In May 2012, Smith tore a hamstring, side-lining him for at least a month.

In January 2017, Smith announced his retirement from professional cricket after a series of injury problems.
