= Wellfield Academy =

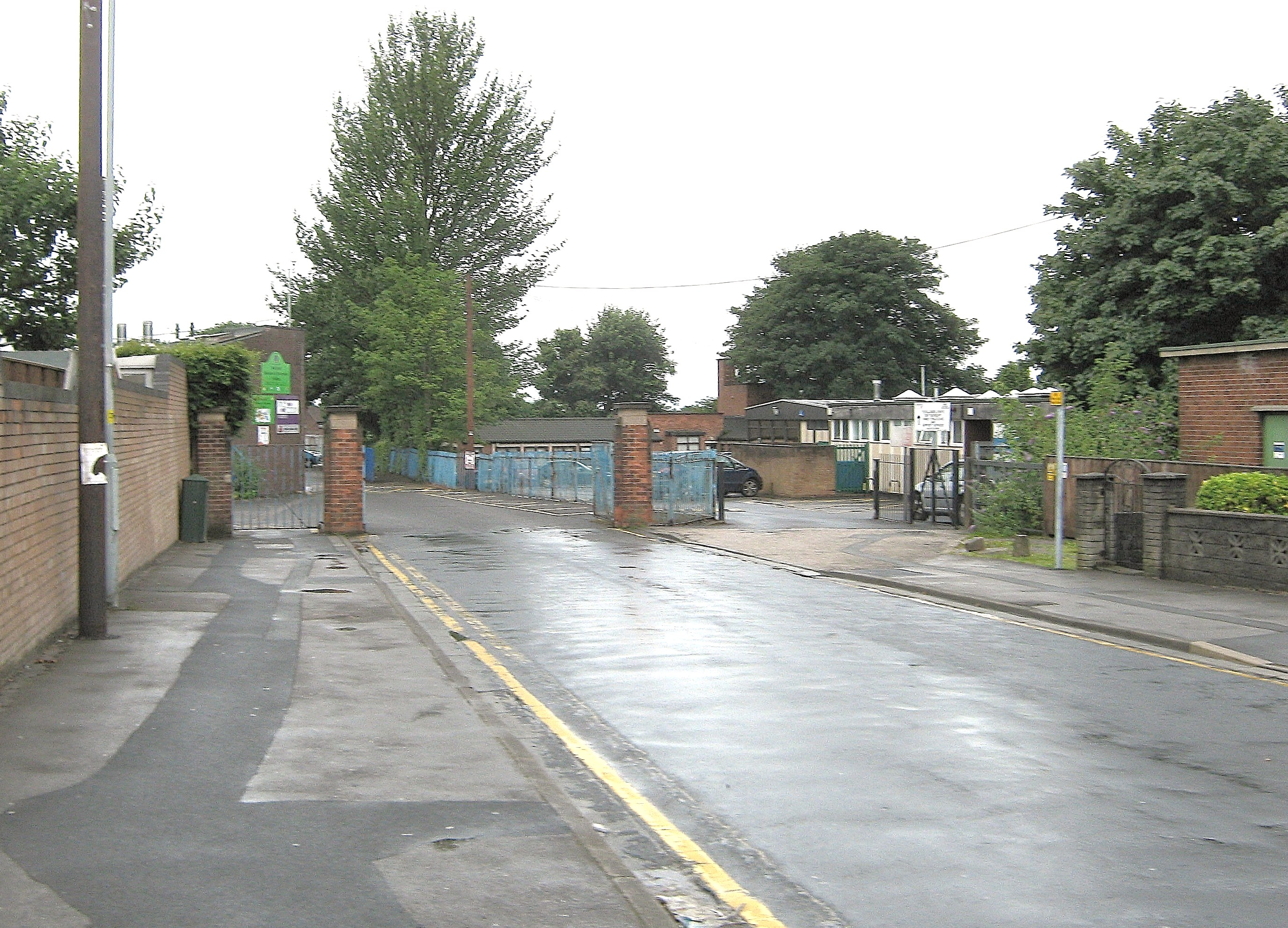
- Entrance to the school grounds

Location
- Yewlands Drive; Leyland; Lancashire, PR25 2TP; England
- Coordinates: 53.69478°N 2.69951°W

Information
- Type: Community school
- Local authority: Lancashire
- Department for Education URN: 119723 Tables
- Ofsted: Reports
- Executive Head: Lesley Gwinnett
- Head of School: Jamie Lewis
- Gender: Coeducational
- Age: 11 to 16
- Website: https://www.wellfieldacademy.org/

Wellfield Academy (formerly Wellfield High School) is a coeducational secondary school located in Leyland in the English county of Lancashire.

Wellfield High School was previously awarded specialist status as a Business and Enterprise College. Today, Wellfield Academy is a Community school administered by Lancashire County Council, however, while remaining a Community School, Wellfield Academy is currently being operated by the Endeavour Learning Trust, a multi-academy trust.

Wellfield Academy offers GCSEs as programmes of study for pupils.
