= Tom Cahill (footballer, born 1986) =

English footballer

Personal information
- Full name: Thomas Christopher Cahill
- Date of birth: 18 August 1986 (age 40)
- Place of birth: Leyland, England
- Height: 1.80 m (5 ft 11 in)
- Position: Striker

Youth career
- 2000–2006: Euxton Villa

Senior career*
Years	Team	Apps	(Gls)
2006–2007	Matlock Town	17	(4)
2007–2009	Rotherham United	8	(0)
2008	→ Altrincham (loan)	11	(1)
2008	→ Ilkeston Town (loan)	12	(5)
2009–2010	Fleetwood Town	13	(2)
2010	→ Harrogate Town (loan)	17	(9)
2010–2011	AFC Fylde	43	(24)
2012	Sunshine George Cross	11	(6)
2012	Richmond	10	(10)
2013	Green Gully	8	(2)
2013–2016	Richmond	47	(45)
2016	Hume City	14	(7)
2017	Melbourne Knights	22	(8)
2018–2020	Heidelberg United	51	(21)
2021	Whittlesea Ranges	10	(4)
- * Club domestic league appearances and goals as of 9 September 2021

Thomas Christopher Cahill (born 18 August 1986) is an English footballer who plays in Australia for National Premier Leagues Victoria side Heidelberg United FC.

== Career ==
=== Early career ===
Born in Leyland, Lancashire, Cahill attended St Mary's High School in Leyland and Runshaw College, where he was a member of their Football Academy. He played in the youth team of West Lancashire Football League side Euxton Villa for several years. In July 2006 he signed for Northern Premier League side Matlock Town while studying for a law degree at Sheffield University. In the 2006–07 season he scored the winning goal against Conference South side Histon in the second qualifying round of the FA Cup.

=== Rotherham United ===
Cahill was set to move to the United States to start a scholarship. However, after he impressed on trial, he instead signed a two-year deal with Rotherham United at the start of the 2007–08 season . Matlock received no fee for the 20-year-old, but they did manage to negotiate a 10% sell-on clause, three pre-season friendlies with the Millers over a five-year period, and first refusal on any youngsters that Rotherham were prepared to release on loan deals.

Cahill was hit with niggling injuries at the start of his Rotherham career. His first appearance for the Millers, came on 6 October 2007 as a 78th-minute substitute in a 3–2 home win over Mansfield Town. After two injuries, Cahill was sent on loan to Conference National side Altrincham on 1 January 2008, where he made 11 appearances, scoring one goal on 8 January in a 2–1 victory over Kidderminster Harriers.

He returned to Rotherham United on 12 March, making a further six appearances that season. In October 2008, Cahill joined Northern Premier League Premier Division side Ilkeston Town on a three-month loan deal.

=== Fleetwood Town ===
After a two-month trial period, Cahill signed for Conference North side Fleetwood Town on 1 August 2009.

=== AFC Fylde ===
In summer of 2010, Cahill joined Northern Premier League Division One North outfit AFC Fylde from Fleetwood and scored 24 goals for the Coasters as they reached the Play-off Final but lost to Chorley. He left the club in August 2011 to spend a year travelling around the world.

=== Move to Australia ===
After moving to Australia in 2011, Cahill joined Sunshine George Cross FC and spent the first half of the 2012 season there, scoring 6 times in 11 appearances in the Victorian State League Division 1, before moving to Victorian Premier League side Richmond SC, where he managed 10 goals from 10 appearances.

He then moved to VPL giants Green Gully SC for the start of the 2013 season, but his stay with the western suburbs based club was short lived, returning to Richmond in mid-2013. In the next two and a half seasons, Cahill went on to become Richmond's captain and top goalscorer in both the 2014 and 2015 seasons, the latter resulting in the promotion of the club. In 2014, his 26 goals in 22 matches saw him win the leagues golden boot award.

Cahill then joined National Premier Leagues Victoria side Hume City on a two-year deal, but left from Melbourne Knights FC at the end of the season after managing seven goals in 14 appearances. At Knights, Cahill managed eight goals in 22 appearances. In October 2017, he was released by Melbourne Knights.

On 2 November 2017, it was announced that Heidelberg United FC had signed Cahill for the 2018 season.
