= St Andrew's Church, Leyland =

Coordinates: 53.6887°N 2.6963°W

St Andrew's, Leyland
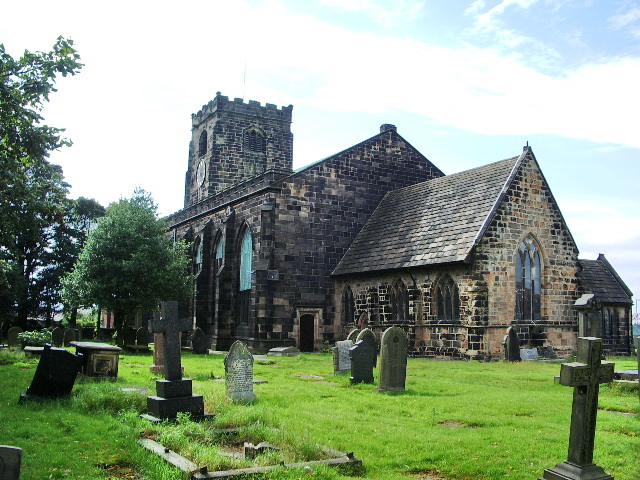
- Parish Church of St Andrews

- Location in the Borough of South Ribble
- OS grid reference: SD 54111 21591
- Location: Leyland, Lancashire
- Country: England
- Denomination: Church of England
- Churchmanship: Conservative Evangelical

History
- Status: Parish church

Architecture
- Functional status: Active
- Heritage designation: Grade II*
- Designated: 26 July 1951

Administration
- Province: York
- Diocese: Blackburn
- Archdeaconry: Blackburn
- Deanery: Leyland

Clergy
- Vicar: Rev David Whitehouse

St Andrew's Church is an Anglican church in Leyland, Lancashire, England. It is an active Anglican parish church in the Diocese of Blackburn and the archdeaconry of Blackburn. The church is recorded in the National Heritage List for England as a designated Grade II* listed building.

== History ==
Historically, the ecclesiastical parish of Leyland was large and encompassed the townships of Leyland, Euxton, Cuerden, Clayton-le-Woods, Whittle-le-Woods, Hoghton, Withnell, Wheelton, and Heapey. There was likely a Norman church on the site of the present structure. In the 12th century, Warine Bussel, baron of Penwortham, gave the church to Evesham Abbey in Worcestershire. From the 14th century, vicars were appointed to Leyland church by the abbey. Following the Dissolution of the Monasteries in the 16th century, the advowson for the church (the right to nominate a priest) was transferred to John Fleetwood of Penwortham.

The chancel was built in the 14th century and the tower probably dates from the late 15th or early 16th century. The older nave was replaced 1816–17, to a design by a Mr Longworth. The church was restored in 1874 by Lancaster-based architecture firm Paley and Austin. The nave roof was replaced 1951–53, and the chancel roof in 1956.

=== Present day ===
St Andrew's was designated a Grade II* listed building on 26 July 1951.

St Andrew's is an active parish church in the Anglican Diocese of Blackburn, which is part of the Province of York. It is in the archdeaconry of Blackburn and the Deanery of Leyland.

St Andrew's is within the Conservative Evangelical tradition of the Church of England. The parish has passed resolutions that rejects the leadership/ordination of women.

== Architecture ==
=== Exterior ===
St Andrew's in constructed of stone; its roofs are stone slate and copper. The plan consists of a nave with a square tower to the west and a chancel to the east. North of the chancel is a vestry. The tower is crenellated with four-stage buttresses at its corners and has a moulded plinth. Three sides of the tower have clocks and there are three-light, arched belfry louvres on all sides.

The Gothic-style nave has a crenellated parapet and a copper roof. It has five three-light windows in its north and south walls. The windows are arched, with tracery. The chancel is low and narrow in comparison to the nave. Its three-light, arched windows also have tracery. The east window has three lights under a pointed arch, with chamfered mullions.

=== Interior and fittings ===
The inside of the tower measures 16 feet 6 inches (5.03 m) square. The floor is lower than that of the nave and there are five steps through a tall arch that has chamfered orders. Internally, the nave measures 73 feet (22 m) by 52 feet 6 inches (16.00 m). There are three galleries. In the southeast corner, there is a chapel.

The chancel measures 39 feet 3 inches (11.96 m) by 18 feet 4 inches (5.59 m) internally. It is accessed from the nave through a moulded arch with circular piers. There are Perpendicular-style triple sedilia (seats) in the south wall of the chancel, under semi-circular arches. They have moulded labels and next to them is a piscina (basin) with two bowls under a similar arch.

Stained glass in the church includes work by Clayton and Bell and Harry Stammers. There are monuments from the 18th and 19th centuries and the Faringdon Chapel in the nave has 19th-century brasses.

== External features ==
To the east of the chancel there is a small early 19th-century watch and hearse house. It is constructed of ashlar and has a slate roof. The churchyard also contains the war graves of 15 Commonwealth service personnel of World War I, and three of World War II.

== See also ==
- Grade II* listed buildings in Lancashire
- Listed buildings in Leyland, Lancashire
- List of ecclesiastical works by Paley and Austin
