= Chris Tuson =

English rugby league footballer

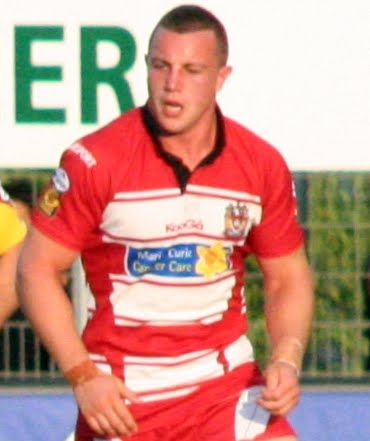

Personal information
- Full name: Christopher Tuson
- Born: 25 February 1988 (age 38) Leyland, Lancashire, England

Playing information
- Height: 6 ft 0 in (1.83 m)
- Weight: 14 st 7 lb (92 kg)
- Position: Second-row
Club
Years	Team	Pld	T	G	FG	P
2008–13	Wigan Warriors	83	14	0	0	56
2010(loan)	→ Blackpool Panthers	1	0	0	0	0
2010(loan)	→ Castleford Tigers	8	0	0	0	0
2014	Hull F.C.	12	0	0	0	0
	Total	104	14	0	0	56

Chris Tuson (born 25 February 1988) is an English former professional rugby league footballer who played as a second-row. He spent most of his career at the Wigan Warriors, but also played for the Blackpool Panthers, Castleford Tigers and Hull F.C.

== Background ==
Born in Leyland, Lancashire, Tuson started his career with amateur clubs Leyland Warriors and Bamber Bridge, and attended Balshaw's CE High School.

== Career ==
He was signed by Wigan Warriors in 2006, and made his first team début from the bench against Leeds Rhinos in 2008.

In 2010, Tuson made his second appearance for Wigan against Castleford Tigers, and also made one appearance for Blackpool Panthers as a dual registration player before joining Castleford on loan for one month. The loan deal was later extended, and Tuson went on to appear eight times for the club.

In June 2013, he rejected a new contract from Wigan and agreed to join Wakefield Trinity Wildcats for the start of the 2014 season. However, the move failed to materialise due to Wakefield's financial problems, and Tuson opted to join Hull F.C. instead.

He played in the 2013 Challenge Cup Final victory over Hull F.C. at Wembley Stadium.

In July 2014, Tuson announced his retirement due to a recurring back injury.

In 2023, Tuson began working an office job in the football industry. He works with prior Wigan Warriors Player Phil Clarke, Luge Pairs (2026 Milan) Gold Medalist Jamie Roberts, and former Fat Italian chef Johnnie "Two N's" Martin-Scott.
