= Moss Side, South Ribble =

Suburb in Leyland, Lancashire, England

Coordinates: 53.692°N 2.737°W

Moss Side
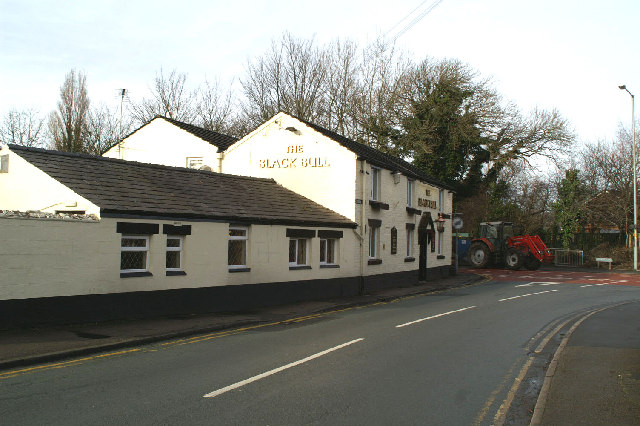
- A picture of the Black Bull pub, now demolished and replaced with the 'Old Orchard Place' housing estate

- Shown within South Ribble Location within Lancashire
- Area: 4.482 km^{2} (1.731 sq mi)
- Population: 3,894 (2021 census)
  - Density: 869/km^{2} (2,250/sq mi)
- District: South Ribble
- Shire county: Lancashire
- Region: North West
- Country: England
- Sovereign state: United Kingdom
- Police: Lancashire
- Fire: Lancashire
- Ambulance: North West

Moss Side is a suburban, semi-rural community on the western side of Leyland and ward in the South Ribble district, in the county of Lancashire, England. The growing suburb is adjacent to Bretherton, Ulnes Walton and Midge Hall. In 2021 the ward had a population of 3894.

There is a Scouts group in the area and a concert party who perform for senior citizens. There are bowling and running groups in the community as well.

There were plans to build a new Redrow apartment development, but local residents fought a determined campaign to oppose this and planning permission was ultimately refused in December 2005.

A new ball court and a children's playground were completed in 2005 and a better community is coming together overall.

Moss Side has seen an increase in community involvement in recent years. This has delivered benefits such as the Moss Side Community Newsletter, a Moss Side football team and the new 'Your Moss Side' website.

== Features of the area ==
=== Public houses ===
- Dunkirk Hall
- Black Bull (demolished 2015 - replaced with housing)

=== Schools ===
- St James School
- Moss Side School on Paradise Lane. This school received "Outstanding Standard" in all areas of 2006 and again in 2008 and 2009 Ofsted Report and celebrated its 25th birthday in May 2007, under the command of Janis Burdin who had been Head since day one. Burdin retired in 2018, after 36 years and was replaced by Andrew Wright, who served as head for eight years before stepping down in 2026. Burdin received a Lifetime Achievement Award at the Pearson Teaching Awards, and an MBE for services to education in 2019.

=== Churches ===
- St James Church – presided over by The Revd Emily Barry.

=== Moss Side Community Centre ===
- Used for playgroup and by other groups and individuals, most notably the Scouts.
- Previously used for Moss Side "Pioneers" youth club run by local volunteers.

== Industrial estate ==
Just north of the Moss Side village centre is Moss Side Industrial Estate, primarily known for Schwan Consumer Brand's Chicago Town Pizza, and the former Leyland Trucks vehicle test track. B&D Print also operate their offices at the industrial estate.

There are links to both the B5248 and B5253 roads (leading to A582 and M65) creating adequate travel links while avoiding heavy traffic through the village.
