= Worden Park =

Park in Leyland, Lancashire, England

Coordinates: 53.684°N 2.699°W

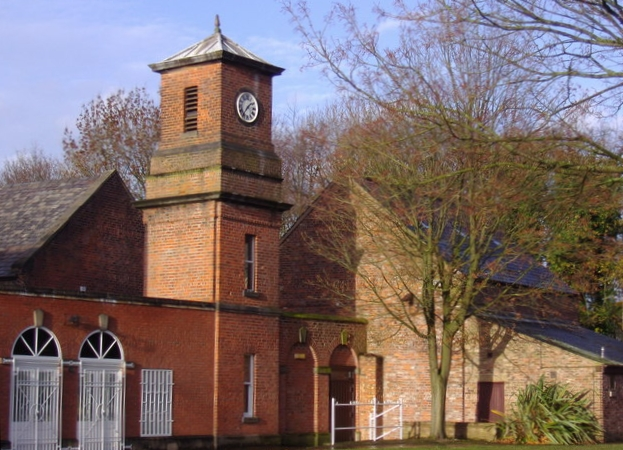
Remains of the old hall, Worden Park

Worden Park is a large area of parkland situated on the outskirts of Leyland, a town in the borough of South Ribble, Lancashire, England. It is less than a quarter of a mile from the town centre.

== History ==
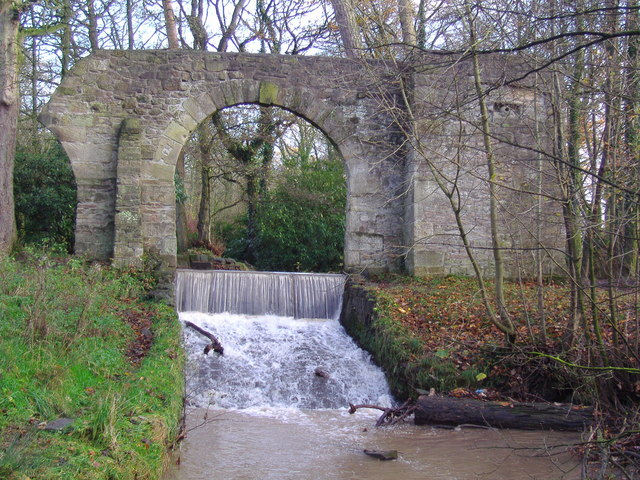
Folly over the Stannings weir, Shaw Brook, Worden Park

=== Farington family ===
The Farington family purchased the house and surrounding lands of Shaw Hall after their original family seat - Old Worden Hall in Buckshaw, Euxton - was judged too small for the family's wealth and social status. With surrounding farmland, the Faringtons formed the park with Shaw Hall, now renamed Worden Hall, at its centre. The area outside the house was blossoming gardens. In 1941, there was a fire in the house, and most of the hall was severely damaged. The house remained standing until the local council purchased the Hall from the family after the war. The most damaged part of the hall was torn down; however what is left of the house and outbuildings can still be seen today. There is an ice house which visitors can view, a maze and a miniature railway that runs round the part of the park that is most visited.

The formal gardens and hedge maze were designed by the landscape architect William Andrews Nesfield.

=== Woodlands ===
There is woodland in the park, most of which runs along Shaw Brook, a tributary of the River Lostock.

=== Green Flag Status ===
Worden Park was given the Green Flag Award for eleven consecutive years, from 1996 to 2006. The award is given to parks and green spaces in England and Wales each year to reward the best green spaces in the country, and has been awarded annually since 1996.

== Features ==
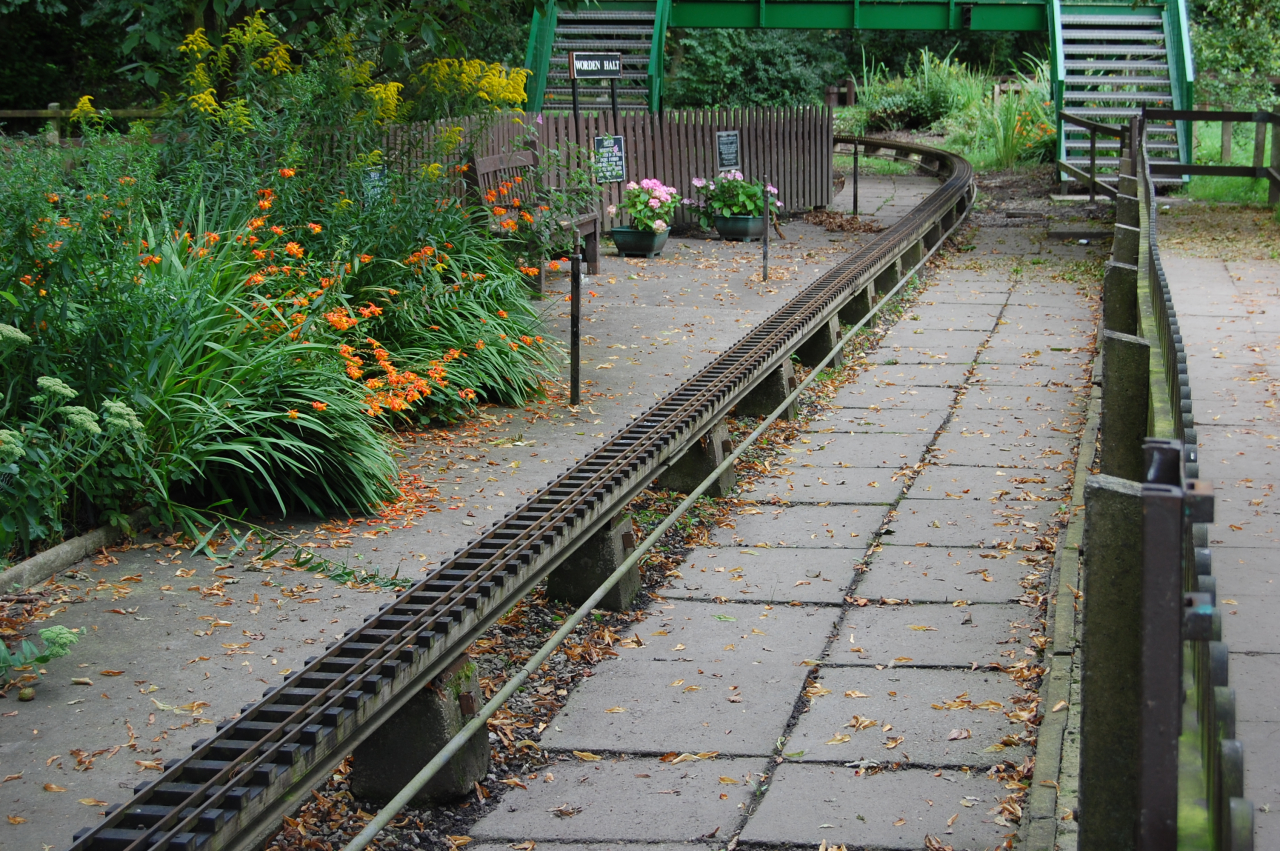
Worden Halt - the miniature railway station

- Playground with rides for children and teenagers
- Football pitches which are free to use by the public and are also used by Sunday League football teams as well as for football training
- Worden Wool Emporium (Hand Dyed British Wool)
- El Tano Wines & Empanadas
- Café (The Folly)
- Miniature trains
- Woodland
- Formal gardens
- Miniature Golf
- Arts and Crafts Centre
- Hedge maze
- Refreshments kiosk

Worden Park is very popular with dog walkers. Dogs are welcomed throughout the park and there are bins around the park for disposing of dog litter. There is a dog-washing shower situated next to the main parking area. The large expanse of parkland makes it very appealing for dog walkers, especially the wooded area to the south. The Shaw Brook, which runs through the wooded area, is a safe place for dogs to swim.

== Bonfire night ==
Each year on or around 5 November, Worden Park plays host to one of Lancashire's gatherings of Guy Fawkes revellers. The local Round Table group organise the event and proceeds are used for charitable and local good causes.

== Accessibility ==
There are two free car parks, both reached from the entrance on Worden Lane. During the busy summer months an overflow car park is opened next to the main car park.

The park is in walking distance from the Tesco supermarket and the town centre.

== Local area ==
Worden Park is on the edge of Leyland and is surrounded on three sides by housing estates.

To the west of Worden Park lies the Wade Hall estate. The old town centre of Leyland is situated north of the park. To the east of the park lies the Worden Park estate. To the south, the park is bounded by farmland.
