= Occleshaw House =

Building in Leyland, Lancashire, England

Coordinates: 53°41′18″N 02°41′54″W

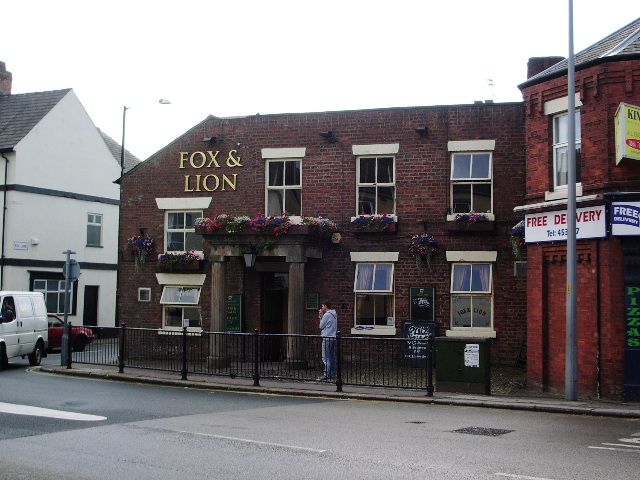
Northern elevation (white building at left)

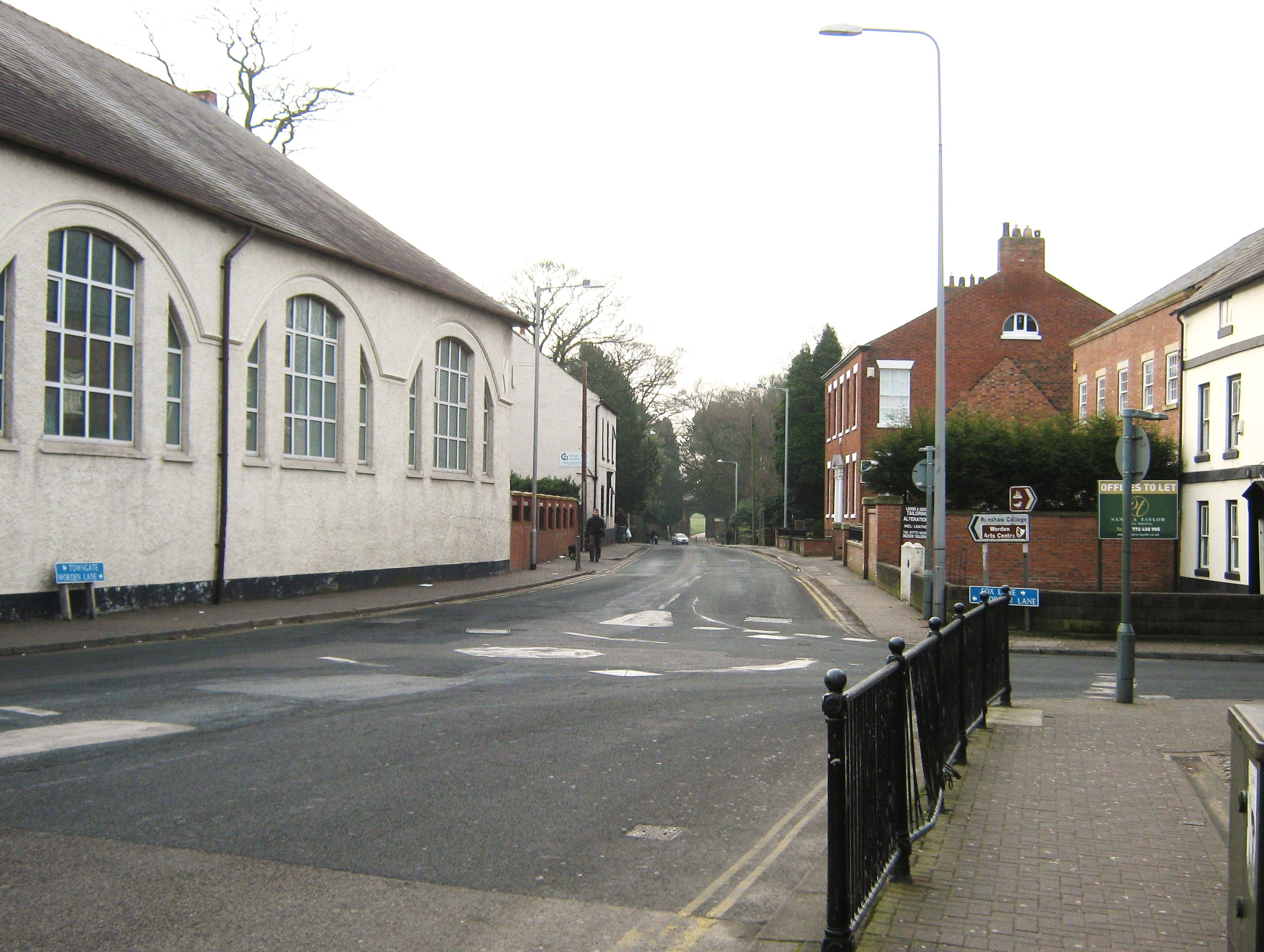
Part of front (east) elevation, at extreme right of photo

Occleshaw House, also known by its address as 2 Worden Lane, is a Grade II listed building in Leyland, Lancashire, England. The building has been described as the site of some of the earliest houses in the village. The current structure is thought to date from the early 18th century and the local historical society has traced occupants back to 1718. It has served as a dower house, chemists, post office, printing press and doctor's surgery before becoming vacant by 2020. In 2021 a cannabis farm in the building was raided by police and in June 2023 the roof caught fire in a suspected arson attack.

== Description ==
The 2.5-storey structure is thought to have been built of brick (the exterior is stuccoed) and has a slate roof. It has a chimney on the ridgeline and another at the southern end, where it adjoins a neighbouring structure. The building faces east and that elevation is somewhat irregular, with five sash windows at ground floor level, four sash windows at the first floor level and three small casement windows in the attic. The floors are divided by banded details. The main entrance is roughly in the centre and has a pilastered doorcase and a pediment. The interior is timber-framed with ovolo-moulded beams.

The structure was granted statutory protection as a grade II listed building on 26 July 1951 under the Town and Country Planning Act 1947. It remains in that grade on the listed building register, maintained by Historic England. At the time of listing the inspector noted the top flight of an 18th-century staircase remained in place with turned balusters and a moulded handrail.

== History ==
The Leyland Historical Society state that Occleshaw House is "reputed to be the earliest house site in Leyland". The name comes from the original Oakenshaw, a village in the east of the county. The building is thought to date to the early 18th century and the Historical Society has traced occupants back to 1718. Historic England note that the structure is said to have been used as a dower house by the Faringtons of nearby Worden Hall (since largely demolished). For many years until her 1771 death the house was occupied by Margaret Bradshaw, widow of George Farington. Local legend places the house as the site of the John o'Gaunt pub and hotel, though Leyland Historical Society has found no evidence of this. The structure housed a chemist and then a post office, the village's first telegram being sent from within it. Part of the structure operated as a printing press for Thelfalls, tobacconists and newsagents. The building was used as a doctors surgery from the 1950s to the 1990s.

The structure was empty for some time before it was sold as potential office space in 2020. The new owners carried out no obvious work to the structure before it was raided by police on 4 March 2021. The building had been used as a cannabis farm; police took 24 hours to dismantle the farm and recover a significant quantity of the drug. On 21 June 2023 the roof of the structure caught fire. Lancashire Fire and Rescue Service was alerted at 3:43 am and four fire engines and an aerial ladder platform attended, remaining on site into the afternoon with the neighbouring Worden Road and Fox Lane closed to traffic. The fire was extinguished before it could spread to the neighbouring structure. A 40-year old man was arrested on suspicion of setting the fire. Since the fire the roof has been left open to the elements. Leyland Historical Society have been assured by South Ribble Borough Council that they are pursuing the owner to make emergency repairs but as of late July 2023 the roof remained unrepaired.
