= St Mary's Catholic High School, Leyland =

St Mary's Catholic High School
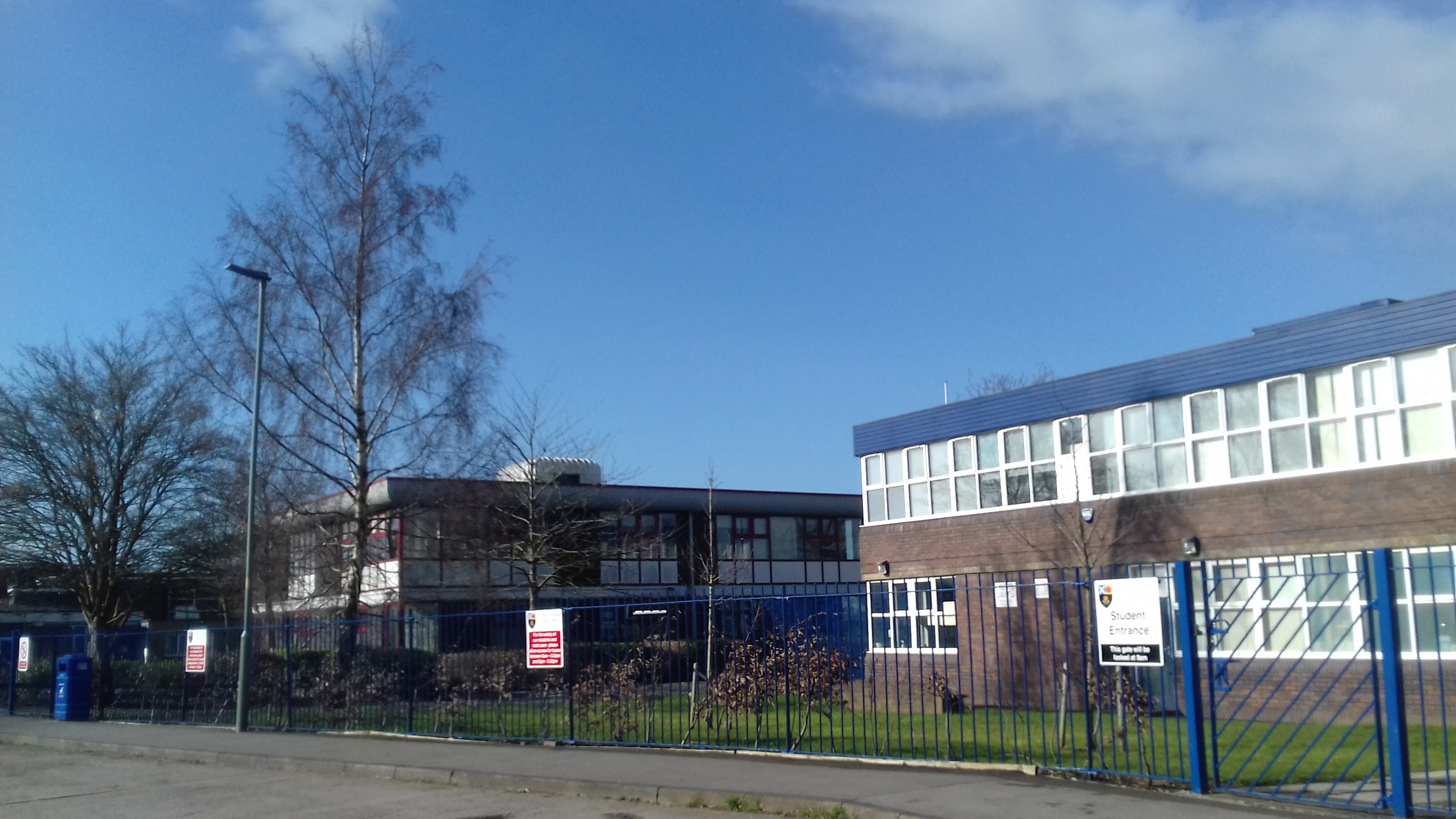
- New school buildings (2018)

Location
- Royal Avenue; Leyland; Lancashire, PR25 1BS; England; 53.68578°N 2.71015°W

Information
- Type: Voluntary aided school
- Religious affiliation: Roman Catholic
- Established: 1957
- Local authority: Lancashire
- Department for Education URN: 119816 Tables
- Ofsted: Reports
- Headteacher: Phil Thompson
- Gender: Coeducational
- Age: 11 to 16
- Enrolment: 769 as of January 2023
- Website: http://www.lsmchs.com/

St Mary's Catholic High School is a coeducational secondary school located in Leyland in the English county of Lancashire.

It is a voluntary aided school administered by Lancashire County Council and the Roman Catholic Archdiocese of Liverpool. Pupils are mostly admitted from St Anne's Catholic Primary School and St Mary's Catholic Primary School in Leyland, St Catherine's Catholic Primary School in Farington, St Mary's Catholic Primary School in Euxton and SS Peter and Pauls’ Catholic Primary School in Mawdesley.

In the 1950s, helped by the growth of local industry, the population of Leyland began to increase. Therefore, in 1957, the school was established to provide for the local area, and in 1962 the local Catholic church, St Mary's Church, was also built. In 1996, the school was awarded specialist status as a Technology College.

On 1 September 2013, the school suffered a devastating fire that destroyed most of the school buildings and caused £15,000,000 damage. Pupils had to travel everyday to a closed school in Ribbleton until Christmas. In September 2015, the new school building was opened to pupils.

St Mary's offers GCSEs, BTECs and Cambridge Nationals as programmes of study for pupils.
