= Parklands High School, Chorley =

Parklands High School
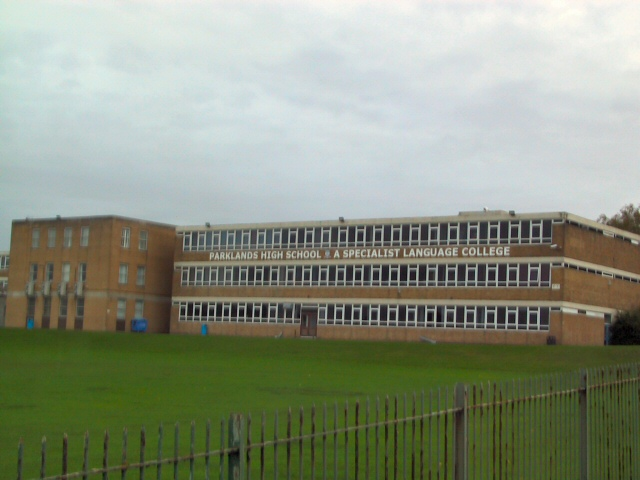

Location
- Southport Road; Chorley, Lancashire, PR7 1LL; England; 53.6562°N 2.6461°W

Information
- Type: Academy
- Established: 1962
- Department for Education URN: 138647 Tables
- Ofsted: Reports
- Executive Headteacher: Lucy Pilkington
- Staff: 130+
- Gender: Mixed
- Age: 11 to 16
- Enrolment: 1121
- Average class size: 30
- Hours in school day: 6
- Houses: Asia, Africa, South America, Europe, Australasia
- Colour: Navy Blue
- Former name: Chorley Grammar School of Chorley Old Road
- Website: http://www.parklandsacademy.co.uk

Parklands High School is a coeducational secondary school with academy status located in Chorley, Lancashire, England. The school has been judged "good" with "outstanding" in the behaviour and safety of pupils, by Ofsted in February 2014. There are currently 1085 students on roll. The current headteacher, Mrs Batson, is the seventh headteacher of Parklands. She was appointed headteacher in 2023.

== History ==
=== Grammar school ===
The current Parklands High School was originally called Chorley Grammar School. It was originally housed in buildings in Union Street, Chorley which is now home to the public library. It changed its name in 1972, when the school changed from a grammar school to a comprehensive school, to Parklands High School.

From 2003 to 2012, Parklands High School held a specialist language college status. The school badge formerly read Propositi Tenax, which translates to Firm of Purpose. The current motto of the school is Learn, Respect, Aspire, Achieve, which has been used since the school became an academy.

=== Buildings ===
The current school buildings were opened in 1959. This included the hall, concourse, south and north blocks and the gym. Several buildings have been erected since the school was first built. This includes the west block, which was built in 1970s, and is currently used as history, music and ICT classrooms.

The first major building work was the extension of the north block, which added four more English classrooms and two photography rooms, which are currently named as N01, N02, N14, N15, N24 and N25. This addition was constructed when Mr. Ray Landless was the headteacher of the school. The Science Blocks (L1/L2) were constructed in 1989.

There were two major building additions in the 2000s, a new art, RE, drama, and science block which replaced the previous block ROSLA, which was demolished, a new sports hall, and in 2010, an extension to the front of the building, to extend the dining area and reception. In addition students created a new outdoor social area.

Parklands was first made a Language College in 2003. In 2014, the Parklands Pavilion was opened after months of refurbishment. This building is currently used as dance studios, and is also used for assemblies.

In late 2020, the previous science block was renovated to create 8 new English classrooms named after influential authors throughout time. Additionally, four former English classrooms were refurbished; creating two new science suites.

=== Academy ===
Parklands High School converted to academy status in September 2012, meaning the school is now independent of local authority control.

== Notable former pupils ==
- Paul Grayson, England rugby player
- Tom Smith, currently with Lancashire County Cricket Club
- David Unsworth, former footballer, coach of Preston North End F.C.
- Holly Bradshaw, olympian
- Bethany Black, Comedian, Actor
- Yrsa Daley-Ward, poet, author, actor
