= Leyland, Lancashire =

Town in Lancashire, England

Coordinates: 53°41′25″N 02°41′57″W

Leyland
- Town
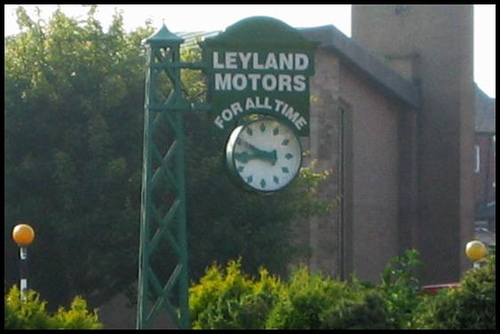
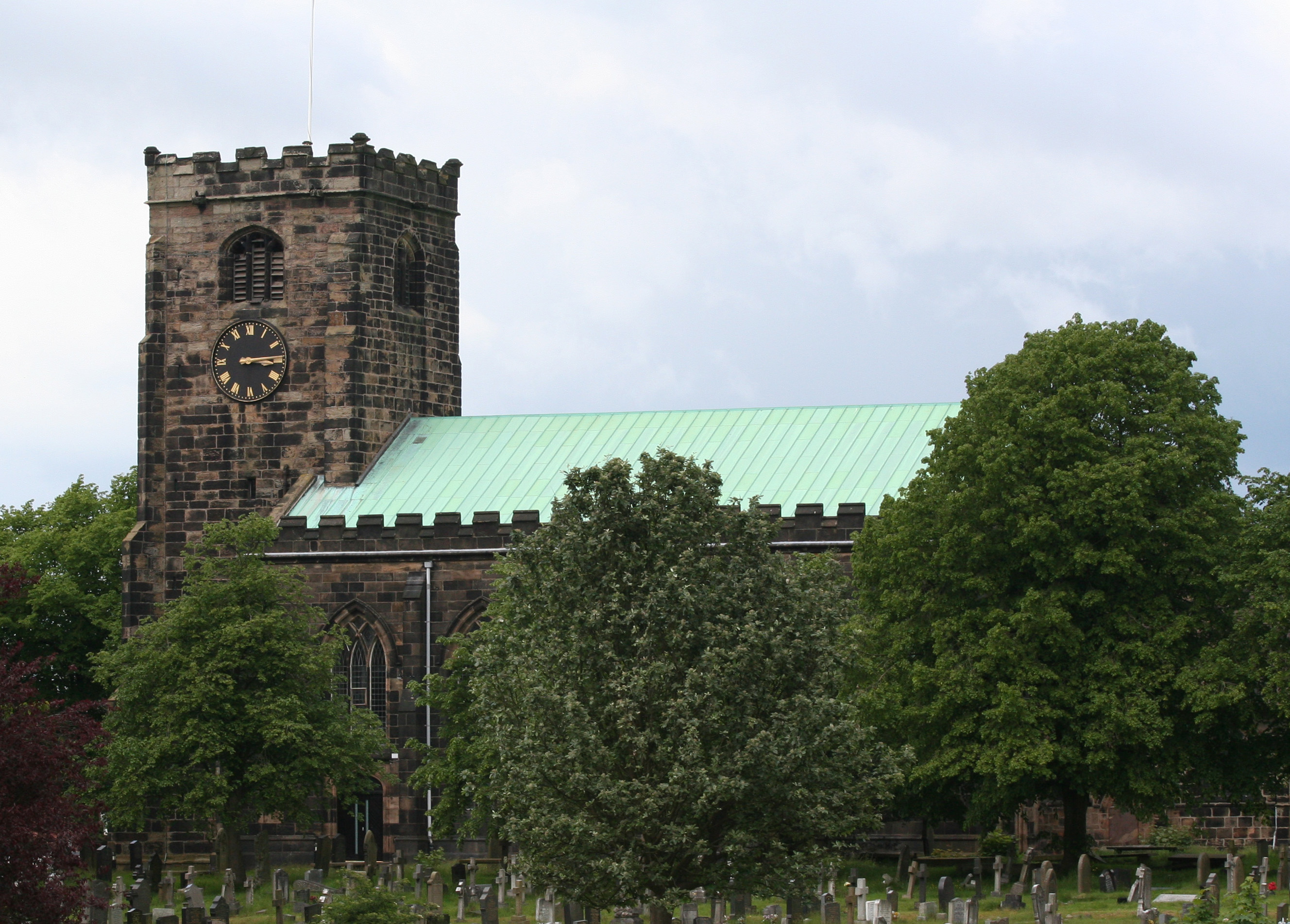
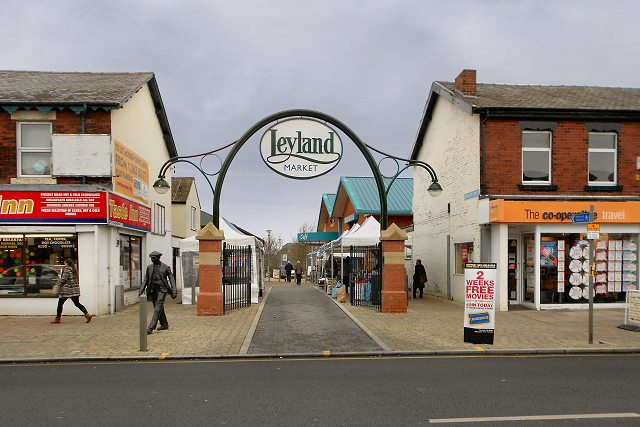
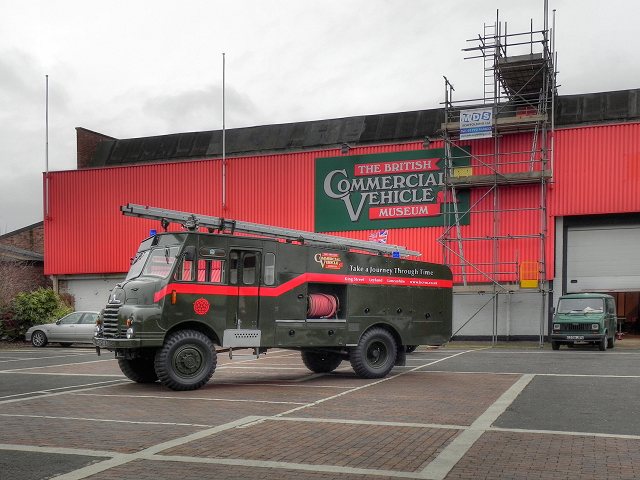
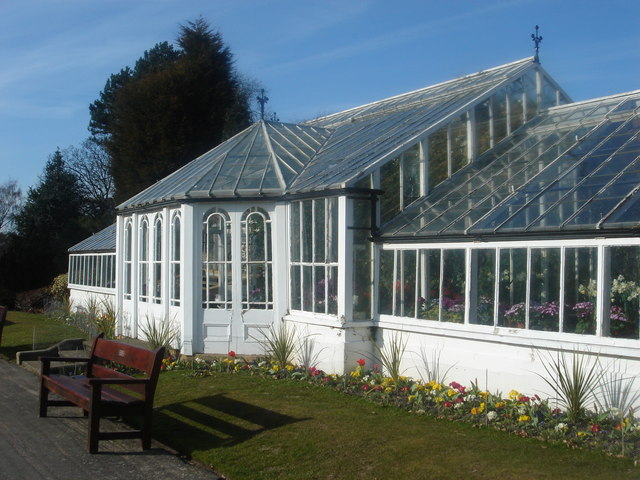
- Leyland Motors Clock St Andrew’s Church Leyland Market British Commercial Vehicle Museum Worden Park

- Shown within South Ribble Location within Lancashire
- Population: 38,578 (2001 census)
- OS grid reference: SD549232
- District: South Ribble
- Shire county: Lancashire
- Region: North West
- Country: England
- Sovereign state: United Kingdom
- Post town: LEYLAND
- Postcode district: PR25, PR26
- Dialling code: 01772
- Police: Lancashire
- Fire: Lancashire
- Ambulance: North West
- UK Parliament: South Ribble

Leyland (/ˈleɪlənd/ LAY-lənd) is a town in the South Ribble district, in Lancashire, England, 6 miles (10 km) south of Preston. The population was 35,578 at the 2011 Census.

== History ==
The name Leyland derives from the Old English lǣgeland meaning 'unploughed land'.

Leyland was an area of fields, with Roman roads passing through, from ancient Wigan to Walton-le-Dale. It is mentioned in the Domesday Book (1085). In 1066, King Edward the Confessor presided over the whole of Leyland. The manor was divided into three large ploughlands, which were controlled by local noblemen. In the 12th century, it came under the barony of Penwortham.

The area of Worden, which is now Worden Park, was one of nine oxgangs of land granted to the Knights Hospitaller, by Roger de Lacy, in Lancashire, but the land was not assigned to any individual and a local man, who was a very close friend of de Lacy, Hugh Bussel, was assigned holder of the land in 1212.

Notable features that remain include the St Andrew's Parish Church, built around 1200 AD, and the large stone Leyland Cross, thought to date back to Saxon times.

== Industry and commerce ==
The town is famous primarily for the bus and truck manufacturer Leyland Motors, which between the 1950s and 1970s expanded and grew to own several British motor manufacturers, including British Motor Corporation, Standard-Triumph and Rover, culminating in the massive British Leyland company. The truck business still operates today as Leyland Trucks, and is owned by Paccar. Leyland was also home to Enterprise plc .

The town has been home to the Dr. Oetker pizza factory on Marathon Place, Moss Side, since 1989.

== Architecture ==
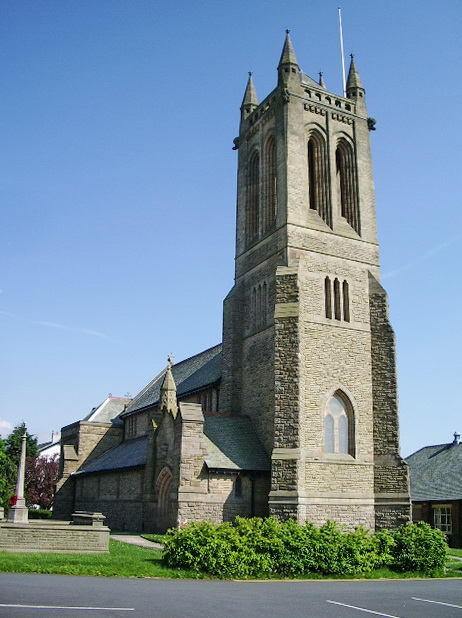
Anglican church of St Ambrose on Moss Lane

The Anglican church of St Ambrose, on Moss Lane, is a Grade II listed building dating from 1882 to 1885 by Charles Aldridge and Charles Deacon. It is constructed of stone and has green slate roofs with red ridge tiles. It is in a mixed Early English and early French Gothic style.

From 1962 to 1964, St Mary's Catholic Church in Leyland was built. It was founded by the Benedictines from Ampleforth Abbey and replaced a smaller church built in 1854. It was designed by Jerzy Faczynski and according to Historic England it is a "building of outstanding importance for its architectural design, advanced liturgical planning and artistic quality of the fixtures and fittings". In 1998, it was designated a Grade II listed building.

Since July 2007, the former Primitive Methodist Church on Leyland Lane has been home to the Greek Orthodox Church of the Holy Apostles.

Most of the residential dwellings in Leyland falls are semi-detached, detached and bungalows. There are a few modern housing estates, but about 65% of the accommodation in the town was built in the 1970s.

On 17 April 2025 the Grade II listed St James' Church on Slater Lane was the target of an extensive graffiti attack, on both the church and surrounding gravestones. Lancashire Police said they were treating the incident as a hate crime. On 29 April a 30-year-old Leyland man was charged with 10 offences and was due to appear at Preston Magistrates' Court.

== Governance ==
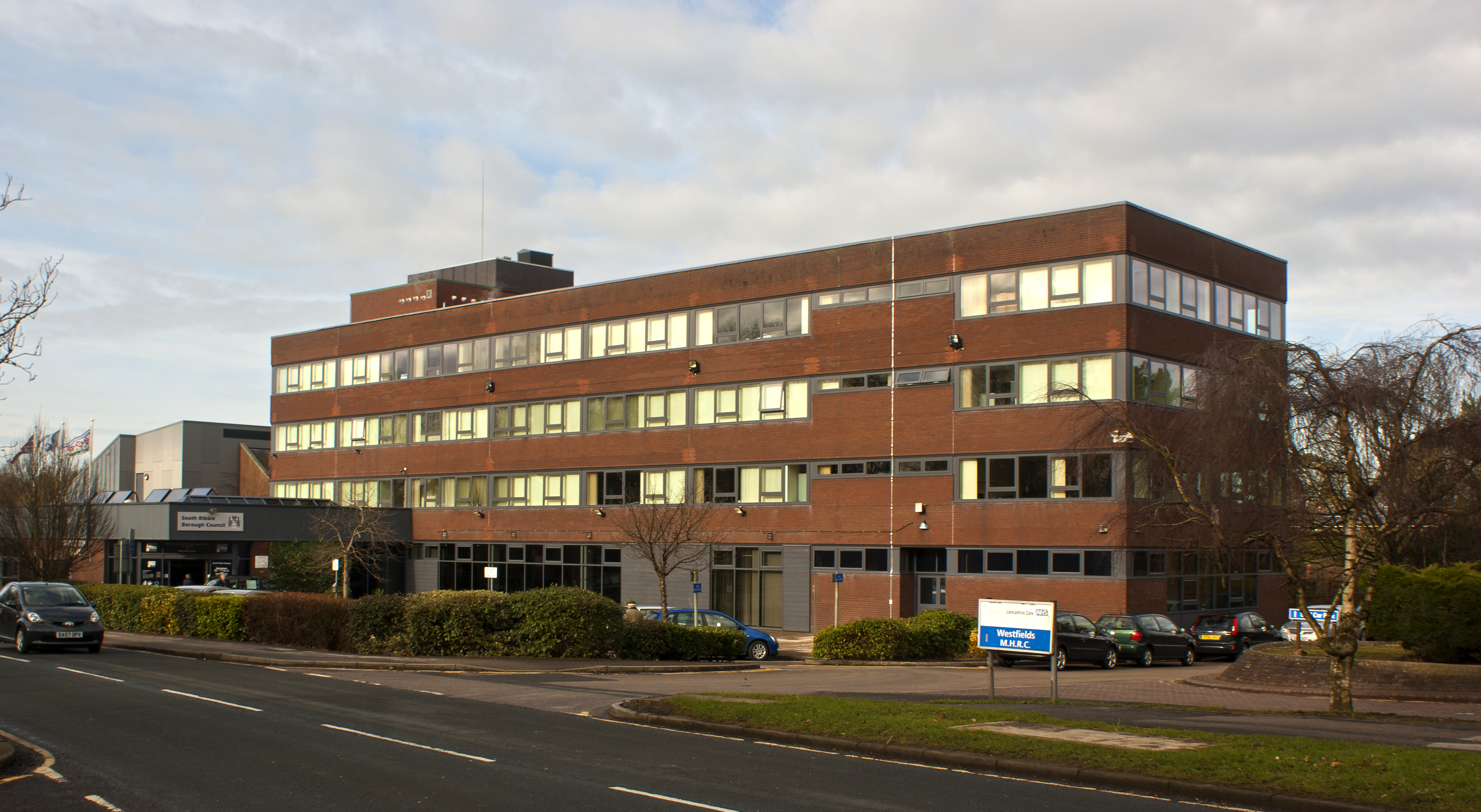
Civic Centre, West Paddock

There are two tiers of local government covering Leyland, at district and county level: South Ribble Borough Council and Lancashire County Council. The borough council is based in Leyland, at the Civic Centre on West Paddock.

Leyland was an ancient parish. In 1863 the parish was made a local government district, governed by a local board. Such local government districts were reconstituted as urban districts in 1894. Leyland Urban District was abolished in 1974 to become part of the new borough of South Ribble. No successor parish was created for the former urban district and so Leyland is directly administered by South Ribble Borough Council. Shortly before its abolition, the urban district council had built itself a new headquarters on West Paddock, which subsequently became the South Ribble Civic Centre.

== Transport ==
=== Train ===
Leyland railway station is on the West Coast Main Line and is operated by Northern. There is one train an hour between Liverpool Lime Street and Blackpool North, and two trains an hour between Manchester Airport and Blackpool North.

There is a marker adjacent to the old Leyland Motors Spurrier works at the halfway point on the railway journey between Glasgow and London, some 198 miles in either direction.

=== Bus ===
John Fishwick & Sons which served the town's public transport needs, and connected the town to Chorley and Preston, ceased trading in 2015 and Stagecoach Merseyside & South Lancashire took over the route. Vision Bus also run a few routes in the village going to Preston or Chorley. There are also direct services to Wigan via the Bee Line Bus Service (Wigan-Preston).

== Media ==
Local news and television programmes are provided by BBC North West and ITV Granada. Television signals are received from the Winter Hill transmitter.

Local radio stations are BBC Radio Lancashire, Heart North West, Smooth North West , Capital Manchester and Lancashire , Greatest Hits Radio Lancashire , Central Radio North West, and Radio Leyland, a community based station.

The Lancashire Telegraph and Lancashire Evening Post are the main newspapers that cover the town.

== Education ==
=== High schools ===
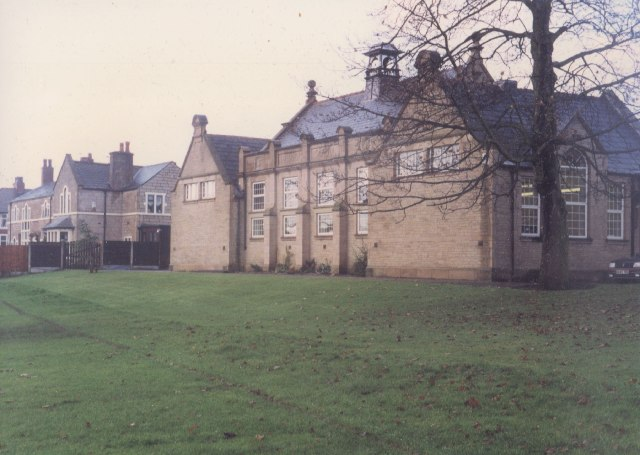
Balshaw's CE High School

High schools in Leyland include Balshaw's CE High School near Leyland Cross, St Mary's Catholic High School, Worden Academy, a smaller high school situated to the west of the town and Wellfield Academy near the town centre.

=== Colleges ===
To the east of Worden Park is Runshaw College.

== Geography ==
Leyland is made up of six different areas. The town centre itself counts as the main retail area, with the railway station, library and shops nearby. The other areas include Broadfield, Moss Side, Worden Park, Turpin Green and the Wade Hall estate.

Having been joined by Clayton Brook, draining the village of the same name to the east, after skirting Lostock Hall, the River Lostock flows south west, past Farington and through the western suburbs of Leyland, collecting Mill Brook (from Worden Park) and Hollin's Brook (draining Runshaw Moor), before moving west towards Croston.

== Notable people ==
Notable people who were born in, have grown up in or lived in Leyland include:

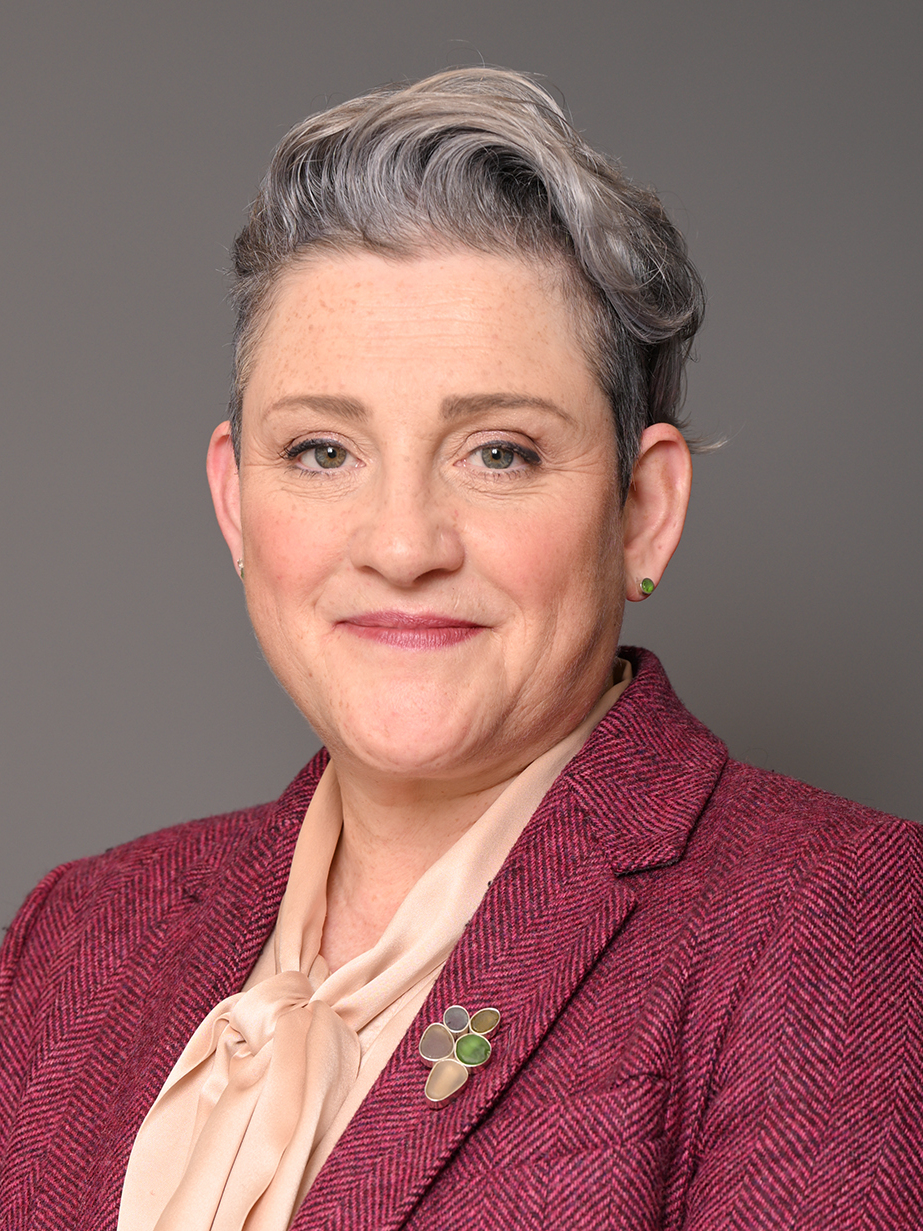
Ashley Dalton, 2023

- John Woodcock (1603–1646), Franciscan priest executed by the Stuarts in 1646.
- Kay Purcell (1963–2020), actress, she portrayed Cynthia Daggert in the ITV soap opera Emmerdale
- Mark Coulier (born 1964), make-up artist and prosthetic makeup expert.
- John Thomson (born 1969), comedian, attended Runshaw College
- Tim Farron (born 1970), Leader of the Liberal Democrats 2015–2017, MP for Westmorland and Lonsdale since 2005, attended Runshaw College as a teenager.
- Ashley Dalton (born 1972), politician, MP for West Lancashire
- Kevin Simm (born 1980), singer with Liberty X, grew up in the area and attended St Anne's Primary School and St Mary's High School
- Tom Bidwell (born 1984), screenwriter, Oscar nominated, BAFTA and EMI winner

=== Sport ===
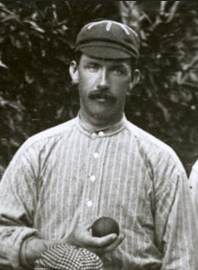
Allen Hill, 1876

- Allen Hill (1845–1910), played 193 First-class cricket games and in the first ever Test cricket game
- Roland Woodhouse (1897–1969), footballer, played over 330 games, mainly for Preston North End
- Frank Moss (1909–1970), football manager and former player, played 143 games for Arsenal
- Brian Pilkington (1933–2020), footballer, played 488 games, including 300 for Burnley
- Mike Salmon (born 1964), retired goalkeeper, played 410 games, now a football manager
- Clarke Carlisle (born 1979), footballer, played 470 games, including 131 for Burnley, was educated at Balshaw's CE High School
- Tom Cahill (born 1986), footballer, played over 280 games, in Australia since 2011
- Chris Tuson (born 1988), rugby league player, played 104 games
- Danny Mayor (born 1990), footballer, played over 450 games, most for Bury
- Phil Jones (born 1992), footballer, played 204 games and 27 for England
- Josh Jones (born 1993), rugby league footballer, played 269 games
- Liv Cooke (born 1999), football freestyler

== Gallery ==
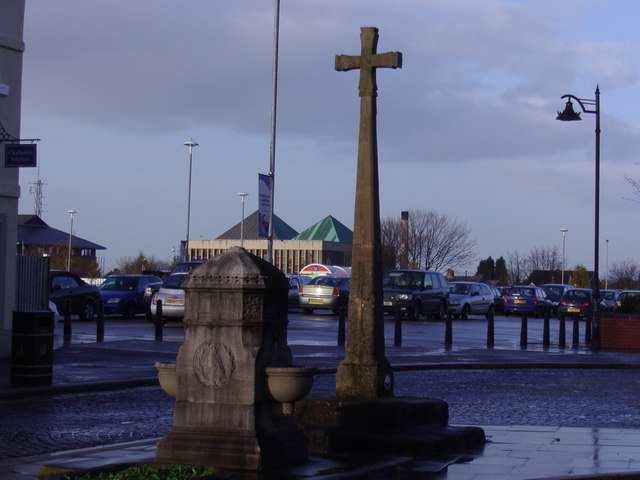
Leyland Cross

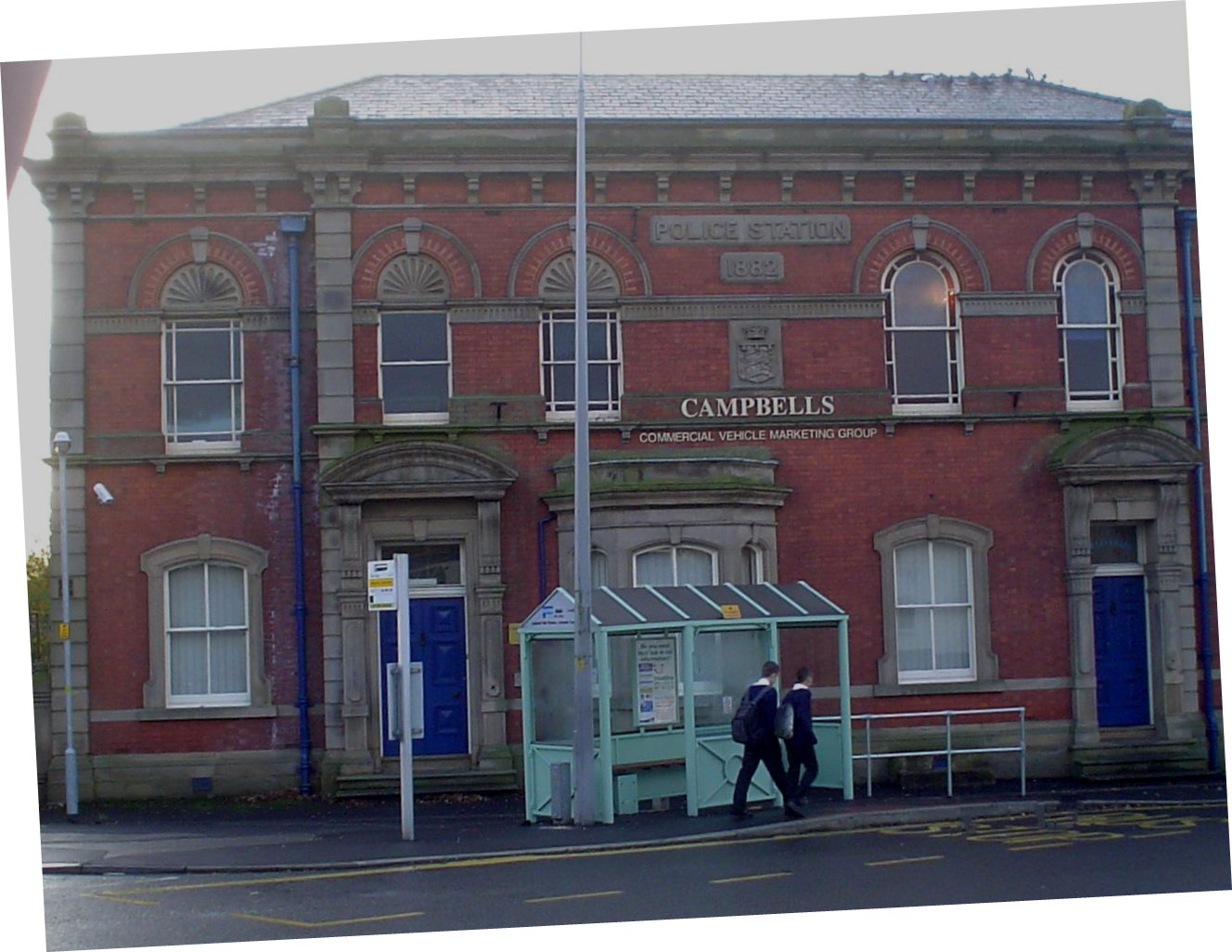
Old Police Station

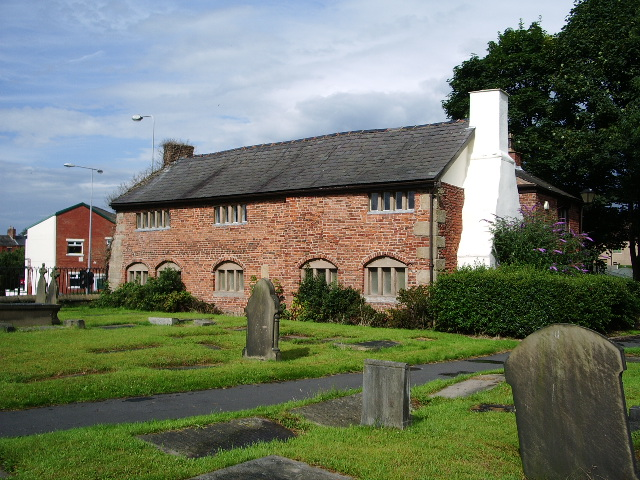
South Ribble Museum

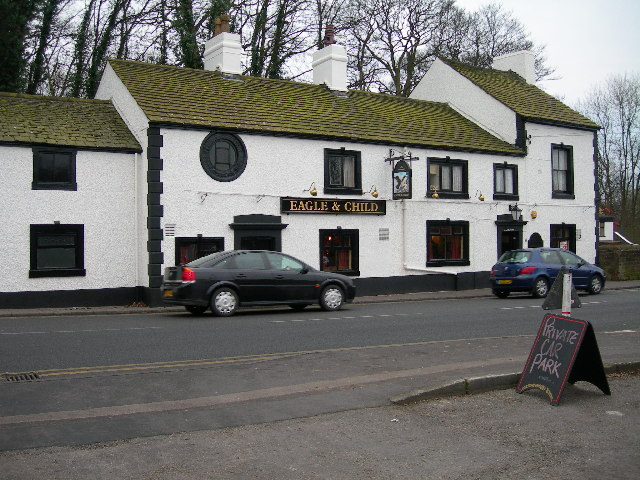
Eagle and Child pub

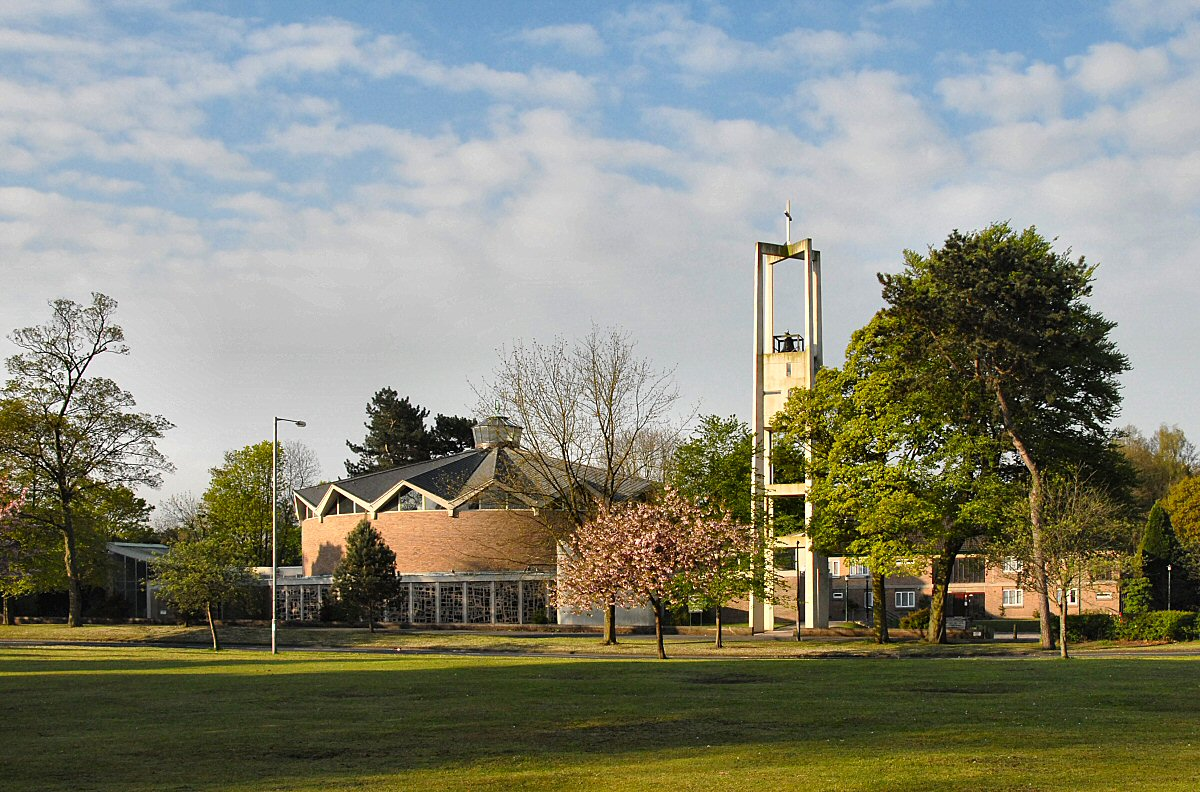
St Mary's Church

== See also ==
- Listed buildings in Leyland, Lancashire
