= Liv Cooke =

British football freestyler and entrepreneur

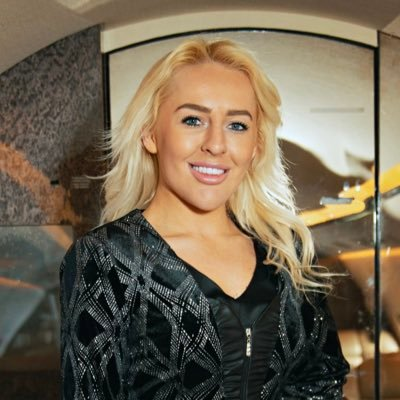
- Liv Cooke in 2022
- Born: 20 April 1999 (age 26); Leyland, Lancashire, England
- Known for: Football freestyle, public figure and entrepreneur
- Spouse: Separated

Liv Cooke (born 20 April 1999) is a British freestyle football world champion, seven-time world record holder and entrepreneur. Rising to fame following her freestyle football success, she became a prime-time BBC Sport presenter on 'MOTDx' and a UEFA ambassador, also earning accolades such as the Parliamentary Rising Star and Woman of the Future awards.

Beyond sport, Cooke has entered the real estate business and mentors other investors.

== Career ==
In 2016, at 17 years old, Cooke became the youngest ever qualifier for the Red Bull Street Style World Finals in London, placing 6th.

Later that year, Cooke qualified for the 2016 World Football Freestyle Championships in Melbourne. She finished second, making her the youngest ever finalist. Cooke broke her foot in the final, which ruled her out for several months.

Having returned to training in April 2017, in August that year Cooke qualified for the 2017 Super Ball open football freestyle championships in Prague. Once there, she won all of her battles to become the world football freestyle champion and the youngest in history to ever take the title. Cooke subsequently began pursuing world records and achieved her seventh in 2023.

In 2018, Cooke became an ambassador for UEFA Women's Football and in 2019, Cooke became a global ambassador for UEFA Euro 2020. While UEFA ambassador, Cooke fronted the 'We Play Strong' campaign, designed to maintain and increase teenage girls' participation in football around the world.

In September 2019, Cooke signed as a BBC Sport presenter. This role included hosting the new MOTDx show, along with presenting features on Football Focus.

In September 2021, Cooke was confirmed as the highest earning female athlete TikTok creator at that time. That timing coincided with the release of her book, The Way to Win, focusing on Cooke's journey to become the football freestyle world champion and providing a ten-step guide for the reader to achieve a dream.

In May 2022, Cooke was announced as the Boston Red Sox Wild Card for baseball's inaugural Home Run Derby X in 2022, participating in the series across London, Seoul, and New Mexico. Cooke helped the Red Sox win the tournament.

In August 2022, Cooke appeared alongside various other athletes and celebrities in the Sport Relief All Star Games, which aired shortly after the conclusion of the 2022 Commonwealth Games in Birmingham.

In November 2019, Cooke founded Liv Cooke Properties Ltd., a company focused on residential real estate developments and investments. Her work on developments has also extended to advising on the development of the £2.6m South Ribble Playing Pitch Hub at Bamber Bridge Leisure Centre, which includes two new 3G pitches.

Cooke appeared in 2024 on Channel 5's Rich House Poor House. Appearing alongside her then wife Gal Ozery, Cooke paid off the Wings' family debt and offered the father the opportunity to follow his dream of becoming a property developer. As was said in the episode, Cooke splits her time between Los Angeles and the UK.

By 2025 Cooke had built her sixth seven-figure business. Her developments have provided homes for more than 600 women fleeing domestic and sexual abuse. That same year, she was named a finalist for Woman of the Year at the National Property Awards.

As her ventures expanded, Cooke spent more time in Los Angeles with her then wife Gal Ozery, and Cooke was granted permanent residency in the United States in the summer of 2025, while continuing to manage projects and investments across the UK.

Following her separation from Gal Ozery in September 2025, she returned to the UK to focus on further scaling her businesses.

== See also ==
- Freestyle football
- World Freestyle Football Association
