= BBC Radio & Music Production Bristol =

BBC news station

Since 1934, Bristol has been the home of radio programmes transmitted throughout the UK and the world via BBC World Service. The BBC Radio & Music Production unit (a.k.a. Bristol Network Radio) operates separately from the BBC Radio Bristol (part of the BBC local radio network), which serves listeners in and around the city. The network production team makes programs for the UK and a global audience. The genre focus in Bristol includes a wide range of topics, such as food and farming, environmental journalism, natural history, investigative documentaries, human interest, Bristol R&M Production readings, drama, poetry, conversation, and political debates. In 2017, the team in Bristol began producing podcasts for the BBC. It has been located in Broadcasting House, Bristol since 1934, which is also home to the BBC Natural History Unit, BBC West, and BBC Radio Bristol, in addition to BBC Network Radio Bristol.

== BBC Network Radio Bristol and the War Years ==
The Bristol BBC operations were important during World War II, when the London-based directors of the World Service chose to move the "morale boosting" parts of the operation away from London. This was because of their fear of attacks during the Blitz, which ultimately led the BBC Symphony Orchestra, all school and children's programmes, religion and variety teams – comprising 700 people in total – to the location in Bristol.

By 1940, six studios were operating at the BBC Broadcasting House, located in Whiteladies Road, however, the BBC also made use of other locations around the city for concerts, music recordings, and public performances. These included Redland Park Hall, All Saints Hall, College Road, the Chapter House, Clifton Parish Hall, and the Co-operative Hall. This was the start of a partnership between the BBC and Bristol's public bodies. The partnership was formalized in 2009, being the first Memorandum of Understanding between the BBC and a UK city.

With the fall of France, Bristol's location meant that it sat within bombing range of the Luftwaffe. Therefore, it was decided to not only extend the BBC broadcasting to Wales in the West, but also to set up emergency underground broadcast studios in the Clifton Rocks Railway caverns. A transmitter, a studio, and a radio control room (complete with an ozonator to combat the smell of the River Avon) were all concealed in the rock cliffs at Clifton Down inside a railway tunnel. As a result, the BBC HQ in London had the control to swiftly switch broadcasting to the Bristol center, sometimes mid-news bulletin when the capital was under air attack, therefore continuing a constant news programme.

== Any Questions ==
Political debate programme Any Questions?, first broadcast in 1948, was developed by the BBC in Bristol in the post-war years. In this weekly programme, members of the public asked their political representatives questions on different matters important to them.

The programme was first transmitted on the West of England Home Service. It was only meant as a six-week stopgap but is still running today and was the inspiration for the BBC television programme Question Time. The programme is produced by a three-person team in Bristol who, for fifty weeks a year, travel to venues in cities, towns, villages, and hamlets at the invitation of community groups, schools, and local organisations across Great Britain and Northern Ireland. On 10 April 1970, the Friday broadcast moved from the BBC Home Service to BBC Radio 4 and it is that network which has been broadcast to both the live and recorded repeat of Any Questions? since that date. It has a weekly audience of about 1.5 million.

== Poetry Please ==
The BBC Radio Production Department is the birthplace of Poetry Please. on BBC Radio 4. Currently presented by Roger McGough, CBE it is thought to be the longest-running poetry programme broadcast anywhere in the world. There have been various attempts to find another contender but, so far, without success. Faber, who published a series of Poetry Please anthologies, have also confirmed this.

The poems featured on the programme come from BBC Radio 4 listener requests. The format was refreshed slightly after two years, from straight requests with actors reading the poems to an interview format featuring both established and up-and-coming poets who go through listener requests to share the poems that have equally inspired them to write and talk about their own adventures in poetry.

For the 40th anniversary of the programme in 2019, presenter and poet Roger McGough chose Charles Causley to read his own Eden Rock. McGough was interviewed by the songwriter, singer, and broadcaster Cerys Matthews. Poetry Please also hosts the Poetry By Heart finals.

"Taking a poem into your heart makes it part of you. Saying a poem aloud makes you part of its life in the world. This is a rich and nourishing relationship that can last a lifetime." - Jean Sprackland

Poetry By Heart is a national competition designed to encourage pupils aged 14–18 in schools and colleges in England to learn and to recite poems by heart.

The series also featured on a BBC4 TV documentary in 2009 to mark the programme's 30th anniversary and its unique role in sharing "the people's poetry" in the UK.

Poetry Please values its connection with Bristol and – in the spirit of partnership with the city – featured Bristol's first-ever Poet Laureate Miles Chambers as a guest in August 2018 as he came to the end of his two-year tenure in the role.

Miles was also the closing voice of the first-ever More Than Words speech at the Radio 4 listening festival in the city.

== Soul Music ==
Another one of the unit's programmes is Soul Music, which has been a popular series on BBC Radio 4 since 2010 but has also been broadcast on the BBC World Service with special focus on international songs.

Soul Music has no presenter, focusing instead on a chosen song and the unique emotional impact it can have on people's lives. Those individuals share their stories of what the featured song means to them. The series has won a number of awards, including a Prix Europa in October 2014, for Strange Fruit, which was produced by Maggie Ayre from the Bristol unit. The same programme won a Radio Academy Gold award in 2013. It was also the winner of the Best Radio Programme Broadcasting Press Guild Award in March 2013, chosen by radio reviewers and critics.

Maggie Ayre talked about her involvement with Soul Music on the UJIMA community radio station when BBC Radio 4 (the Bristol team) and UJIMA created a partnership event, which was held in Bristol to tell the story of 50 years of Bristol Civil Rights activism in November 2016.

== The Fun Factory ==
BBC Bristol began producing BBC drama from 1940 onward. Shows like ITMA, Bandwagon, Workers Playtime, and Garrison Theatre were all made and broadcast from BBC Bristol as part of what they called "The Fun Factory". The BBC acquired the Christchurch Studios in Clifton to record dramas. (These studios were subsequently taken over by Bristol Old Vic Theatre School in 2001). As drama changed, the network radio team in Bristol, led by then Chief Producer Jeremy Howe Jeremy Howe (radio drama editor) (currently the editor of BBC Radio 4's soap opera The Archers) encouraged a new approach. Subject matter and stories, the production techniques and editing are more typical of factual documentary making with producers digitally editing their own work and focusing as much on the edit as the performances.

== Partnerships ==
The BBC Network Radio department in Bristol was honoured to receive a special award for its contribution to the nation, to the city and to the region in 2013 by the local Royal Television Society. They recognised radio's role in encouraging new talent, discovering and celebrating British actors, writers, and broadcasters. The award was accepted by broadcaster Jonathan Dimbleby who started his own distinguished career as a news reporter at the BBC in Bristol.

BBC Radio & Music Production in Bristol has also been the catalyst for two festivals in the city. More Than Words - a celebration of Radio 4 and speech radio - in 2012. Bristol Food Connections (2013–2019) bringing good food and people together to debate and celebrate inspiring ideas through the filter of food.

== Regional output ==
As with all other BBC regions, BBC Bristol is responsible for providing local radio services and the regional television news broadcasts on BBC One during the times when all regions opt out of the network feed to provide their own local news programming, which in the BBC Bristol area is called Points West.

BBC Points West is broadcast from Broadcasting House in Bristol, and is the regional news for;

- Bristol
- Somerset
- Majority of Gloucestershire
- Majority of Wiltshire
- North Dorset.

BBC Radio Bristol also broadcast from Broadcasting House which provides local radio to Bristol, Bath, South Gloucestershire, North and North East Somerset.

== Programs of note ==
The BBC is a publicly funded broadcaster. The licence fee pays for radio as well as television programmes. The BBC radio programmes made in Bristol include:

- Any Questions
- Great Lives
- One To One
- A Good Read
- Word of Mouth
- Poetry Please
- Out of the Ordinary
- The Patch
- The Untold
- A Good Read
- Natalie Haynes Stands Up for the Classics
- Evil Genius
- Ramblings with Clare Balding
- Farming Today
- Open Country
- On Your Farm
- Costing the Earth
- The Food Programme
- Sketches
- The BBC Earth Podcast
- The Living World
- Tweet of the Day
- Natural Histories
- Book of the Week
- Short Cuts
- The Invention of...
- Recycle Radio
- Afternoon Drama
- With Great Pleasure
- The History of Ideas (with BBC Radio 4)

Additionally, The People's Shipping Forecast was a highlight of the We British day - exploring the many identities and influences on the British Isles as evidenced through its poems and its voices. This encouraged BBC Radio 4 listeners to suggest their own poetic lines (inspired by the BBC Radio 4 shipping forecast) which were joined to create something for the stormy waters of everyday living. The poet Murray Lachlan Young used these to create and read this work.

More recently the Bristol-based poetry & arts team in BBC network radio has made the Four Seasons equinox poetry inserts for BBC Radio 4 - quarterly burst of poetry to reconnect listeners with nature and poems which chime with the changing of the seasons.

== Famous voices ==
Presenters associated with Bristol include:

- Matthew Parris
- Roger McGough
- Harriett Gilbert
- Grace Dent
- Jonathan Dimbleby
- Chris Mason
- Clare Balding
- Jolyon Jenkins
- Joe Queenan
- Natalie Haynes
- Sheila Dillon
- Dan Saladino
- Helen Mark
- Charlotte Smith
- Anna Hill
- Caz Graham
- Sybil Ruscoe
- Tom Heap
- Brett Westwood
- Polly Weston
- Emily Knight
- Michael Rosen
- Dr Laura Wright
- Melvyn Bragg
- Russell Kane
- Jaega Wise
- Leyla Kazim

== Partnerships ==
In March 2012, The Network Radio team in Bristol curated and presented a weekend speech festival in Bristol called More Than Words. It was sponsored by BBC Audio & Music Content and was a not-for-profit partnership festival.

It brought together different creative groups and organizations in the city as part of the Bristol BBC cultural partnership. It was staged to celebrate the best of BBC Radio 4 in conjunction with appropriate non-commercial partners including St George's Bristol, The British Library, Bristol City Council, University of the West of England, Pervasive Media Studios, Bristol University, QEH Bristol, and BBC Radio Bristol.

Some of the events and involvement with the creative people of Bristol were captured in this blog

In March 2013, BBC Network Radio in Bristol celebrated the arrival of Radio 4's Food Programme to the city by inviting food professionals, food groups, and food lovers to join them in an innovative community partnership festival called "Bristol Food Connections", bringing people together around good food. The first Bristol Food Connections festival was an ambitious 11-day initiative, born out of a five-year partnership between the BBC and public bodies in the city to drive much stronger engagement between the BBC in Whiteladies Road and local people. The aim of Bristol Food Connections was to open up food education, aspiring entrepreneurs, and the food industry to the widest possible talent pool through outreach and education initiatives via BBC broadcasting.

== BBC Food and Farming Awards ==
The BBC Food and Farming Awards has been an annual event in the city since 2013 although the awards themselves were launched in 2000 in London by HRH Prince Charles. These are publicly funded, free-to-enter awards were the shortlisted candidates are nominated by BBC audiences.
