= Sipi =

Sipi or SIPI may refer to:

- Sipí, a municipality and town in the Chocó Department, Colombia
- Sipi (film), a Ugandan film
- Southwestern Indian Polytechnic Institute, a community college in Albuquerque, New Mexico
- Sipi, mutton flaps, an inexpensive cut of meat from a sheep

== See also ==
- Sippi
