= Beat the Chef =

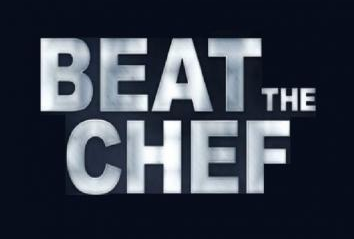
- Genre: Game show
- Presented by: Andi Oliver
- Starring: Mark Sargeant; Frederick Forster; Clodagh McKenna
- Country of origin: United Kingdom
- Original language: English
- No. of seasons: 2
- No. of episodes: 34

Production
- Executive producer: Melanie Darlaston
- Running time: 23 minutes
- Production companies: Twofour; Motion Content Group

Original release
- Network: Channel 4
- Release: May 27, 2019 – May 13, 2021

Beat the Chef is a British television cooking game show broadcast by Channel 4 and hosted by Andi Oliver. The series features contestants preparing a home-cooked family recipe, while professional chefs Mark Sargeant, Frederick Forster and Clodagh McKenna make the same recipe in an upscale restaurant version. The two dishes are then judged by a panel of food critics, including BBC Food Programme presenter Leyla Kazim. The series premiered on 27 May 2019. In 2022, the series was embroiled in controversy by continuing to employ Mark Sargeant after a jury in the U.S. ruled that he sexually assaulted an American woman in Germany. After the allegations were made public, episodes featuring Mark Sargeant were not broadcast with repeat episodes from the previous series broadcast instead.

== Format ==
In this series hosted by restaurateur Andi Oliver, skilful amateur cooks go head-to-head with professional house chefs in fast-paced cook-offs to win a cash prize of up to £10,000. The house chefs to beat are Michelin-starred Mark Sargeant, bestselling cookbook author and celebrity chef Clodagh McKenna, award-winning chef James Tanner and Roux Scholar Frederick Forster. In each round, the food jury conducts a blind tasting the home cook's and the professional's dishes and votes on which it prefers. The more votes the amateur gets, the more money they win, but if they receive no votes and they go home empty-handed.

== Production ==
The series is produced by Twofour.

A second series began filming in 2020 and was released in 2021.
