= The Galactic Garden =

- Genre: Science fiction
- Written by: John Downer & Andrew Sachs
- Directed by: John Downer (director)
- Composer: Elizabeth Parker
- Country of origin: United Kingdom

Production
- Running time: 60 minutes
- Production company: BBC Bristol

Original release
- Network: BBC

The Galactic Garden was a 1985 British television drama with a science fiction theme.

A pair of alien visitors to earth arrive in a seed shaped space-pod, and begin exploring the new world of a suburban garden.

The drama was produced by BBC Bristol, and included Andrew Sachs, Mona Bruce and Sarah Neville amongst its cast. The director was John Downer, who also wrote the drama with Andrew Sachs.
