= Hoghton =

Village in Lancashire, England

Coordinates: 53.732°N 2.586°W

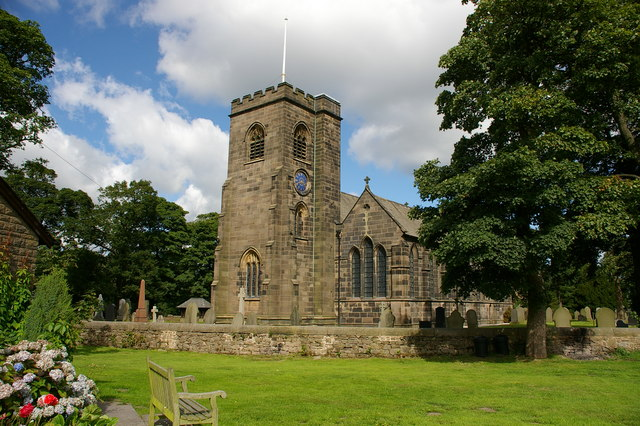
- Holy Trinity Parish Church

- Shown within Chorley Borough Location within Lancashire
- Population: 802 (2011 Census)
- OS grid reference: SD614263
- Civil parish: Hoghton
- District: Chorley
- Shire county: Lancashire
- Region: North West
- Country: England
- Sovereign state: United Kingdom
- Post town: PRESTON
- Postcode district: PR5
- Dialling code: 01254
- Police: Lancashire
- Fire: Lancashire
- Ambulance: North West
- UK Parliament: Chorley

Hoghton is a small village and civil parish in the Borough of Chorley, Lancashire, England. At the 2011 Census, it had a population of 802. Brindle and Hoghton ward also includes the parish of Brindle.

Hoghton Tower is a fortified manor house, and the ancestral home of the de Hoghton family from the 12th century.

Also within the parish are the hamlets of Riley Green and Hoghton Bottoms. The villages of Gregson Lane and Coupe Green are sometimes described as lying in Hoghton, although they are outside the parish, forming the ward of Coupe Green and Gregson Lane in the South Ribble district.

A local folk tale tells that two Hoghton poachers once raided a rabbit warren inhabited by fairies. When they heard the fairies' voices coming from the sacks they were carrying, they fled in terror.

The village has two public houses, the Boar's Head, which claims to be one of the final overnight stops of the Pendle Witches before their eventual trials and sentencing at Lancaster in 1612, and the Royal Oak at Riley Green. The other pub in the village, The Sirloin, dating from 1617, burnt down in early February 2019. It had previously contained a restaurant. The name derived from a visit to nearby Hoghton Tower by James I in 1617.

== Notable people ==
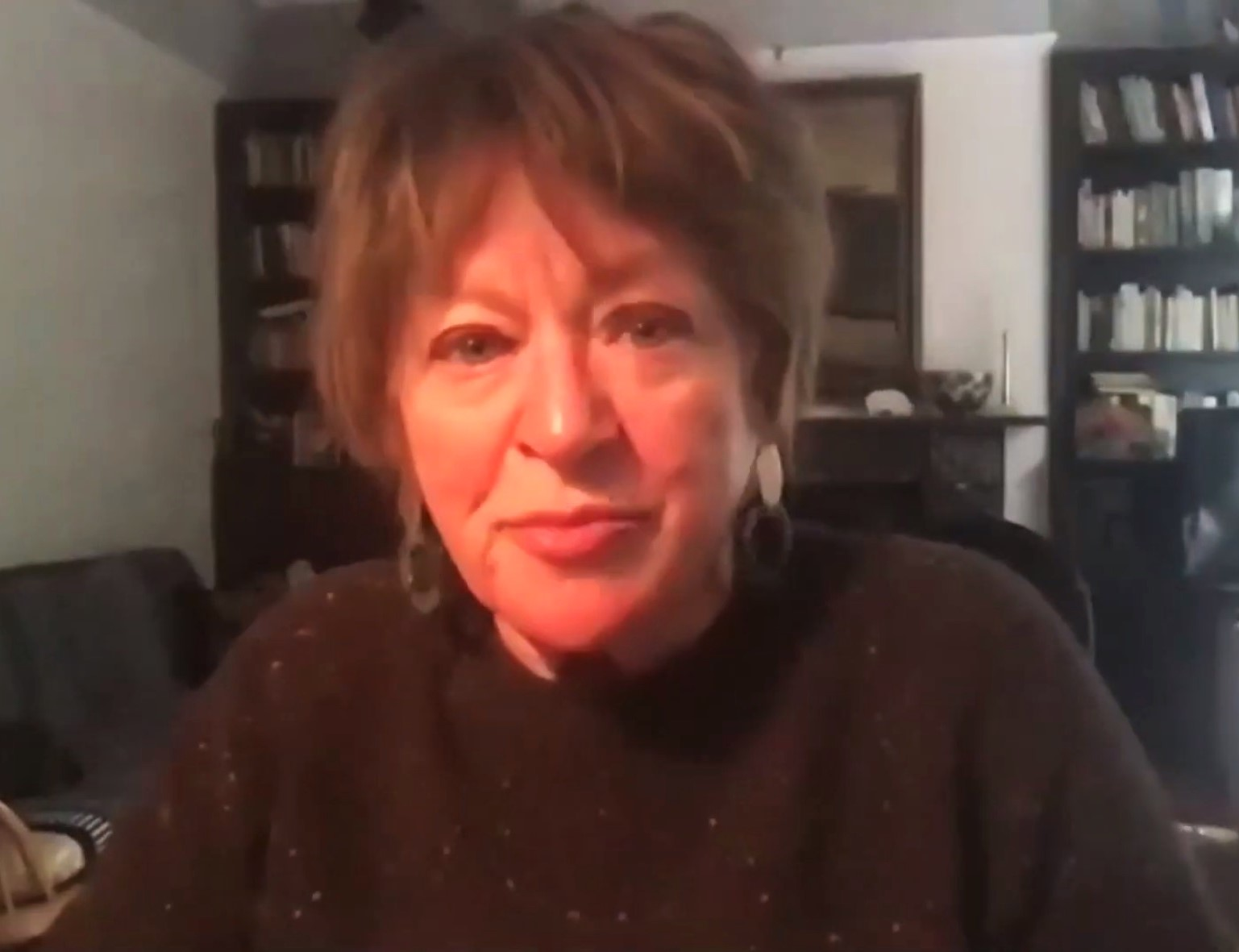
Sheila Dillon, 2020

- Sir Richard Hoghton, 1st Baronet (1570–1630), landowner and politician, sat in the House of Commons, 1601 and 1611.
- Sir Gilbert Hoghton, 2nd Baronet (1591–1648), Royalist and politician, sat in the House of Commons, 1614 and 1640.
- Sir Richard Hoghton, 3rd Baronet (c. 1616–1678), Roundhead and politician, sat in the House of Commons, 1640 and 1656.
- James Miller (1890–1916), Private in the King's Own Royal Regiment (Lancaster), recipient of the Victoria Cross
- Sheila Dillon (born c. 1955), British food journalist, presenter of the BBC Radio 4's The Food Programme

== See also ==
- Listed buildings in Hoghton
