= Leyla Kazim =

British broadcaster and journalist

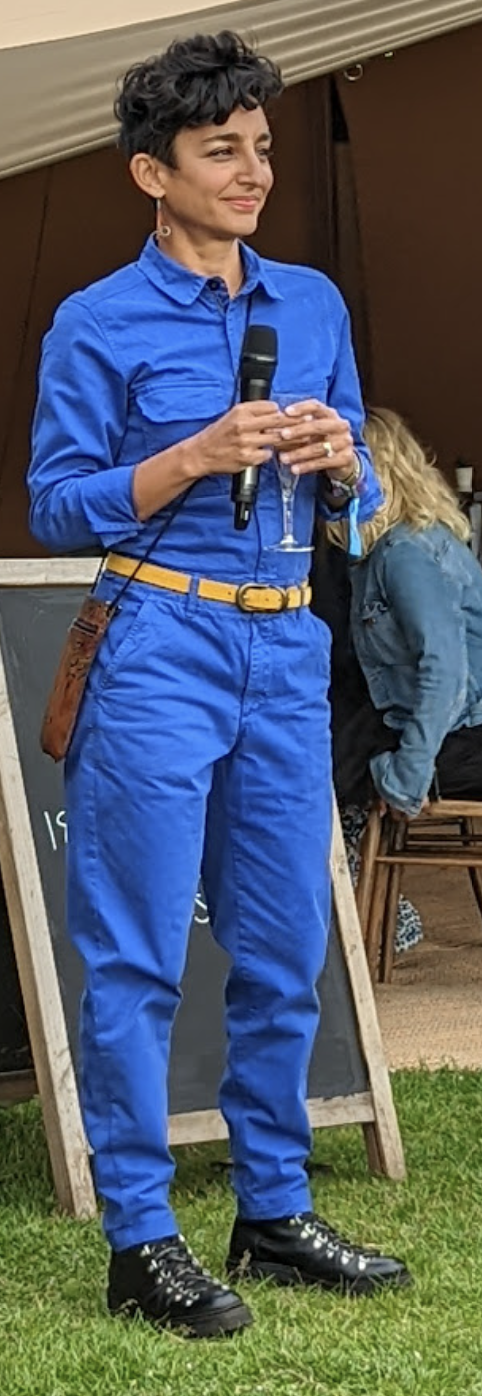
- Kazim in 2022
- Born: August 1985 (age 40–41); Sidcup, London, England
- Education: University College London
- Years active: 2012–present
- Website: www.thecutlerychronicles.com

Leyla Kazim (born August 1985) is an English writer and media personality. She gained prominence through her food and travel blog before joining The Food Programme on BBC Radio 4 as a presenter. On television, she appeared in Beat the Chef on Channel 4 and the BBC One MasterChef franchise. Her work has received a number of accolades, including being nominated for a Fortnum & Mason Food and Drink Award.

== Early life and education ==
Kazim was born in Sidcup, South London to a Turkish-Cypriot father and Mauritian mother and grew up in Welling. Kazim attended Townley Grammar School in Bexleyheath. She graduated with a degree in astrophysics from University College London. In 2010, Kazim ran the Royal Parks Half Marathon and raised money for a local Croydon charity.

== Career ==
Kazim started her personal food and travel blog in October 2012 under the name The Cutlery Chronicles. The Cutlery Chronicles was a 2013 Good Food favourite blogs pick. Kazim also contributed to the likes of Great British Chefs and the Sutton & Croydon Guardian. She created a second website in 2015 called London Cheap Eats dedicated to archiving meals at independent London joints for £8 or less. Kazim appeared on the Evening Standard list of top 10 London foodie influencers on Instagram. By 2018, Kazim had garnered over 100 thousand Instagram followers.

In 2018, Kazim and Adam Liaw helped curate Lonely Planet's inaugural Ultimate Eatlist guide by assessing and narrowing down submitted food recommendations. For this, Kazim drew upon her experiences traveling circa 2015.

In early 2019, Kazim judged the BBC Food & Farming Awards for the first time, later returning to host annually, as well as the new Channel 4 cooking competition show Beat the Chef as part of the critic panel.

After making her first appearances in September and October for the show's 40th anniversary, Kazim officially joined The Food Programme on BBC Radio 4 as a presenter in November 2019. The Food Programme won Best Food Podcast or Broadcast at the 2021 Guild of Food Writers (GFW) Awards. An episode Kazim presented titled "Pure umami: should we learn to love MSG?" was shortlisted for a Fortnum & Mason Food and Drink Award in the Radio category.

Kazim joined the BBC One cooking competition series MasterChef: The Professionals and Masterchef as a food critic, making her first appearance on the former in November 2022. She took part in MasterChef: Battle of the Critics in 2023. Also in 2023, Kazim presented the BBC One programmes Coast to Coast Food Festival and Food Fest England and hosted installments of the Fortnum & Mason supper club series Food Behind the Pages with the likes of Max La Manna.

Kazim's debut book Pathways was published in 2025. Emma Gannon provided the foreword. The book consists of personal essays that cover change, disillusionment, and growth as Kazim muses on her decision to move to a farm in rural Portugal.

== Personal life ==
Kazim married her husband Matt in June 2018. Before moving to Portugal, she lived near Colliers Wood.

== Bibliography ==
- Pathways (2025)
