= Bob Kennard =

Bob Kennard is an author and agriculturalist from Mid-Wales. He has over 20 years experience in farming, organic food and notably mutton. He was named a Food Hero by The Times in 2005. He received the 'Best Campaigner Award' from BBC Radio 4's The Food Programme in 2009. In 2014, his first book "Much Ado about Mutton" was published by Merlin Unwin press.
