= Mutton Renaissance Campaign =

2004 British campaign to eat sheep

The organization's logo

The Mutton Renaissance Campaign was founded in 2004 by King Charles III (then Prince of Wales) to advocate for the consumption of mutton (and not lamb) by Britons. The King, whose favourite dish is mutton, also aimed to support British sheep farmers struggling to sell their older animals. The Renaissance Campaign sought to create a specific new definition for mutton, which is that the meat has to be traceable to an origin on a particular farm where the animal was fed on forage (rather than high-concentration grain), from an animal older than two years, and after slaughter has been aged for two weeks by hanging. The organization's website also maintained lists of restaurants serving mutton as well as places to buy the meat in the UK.

== See also ==
- Mutton curry
