= Riley Green, Lancashire =

Hamlet in Lancashire, England

Coordinates: 53.723°N 2.573°W

Riley Green
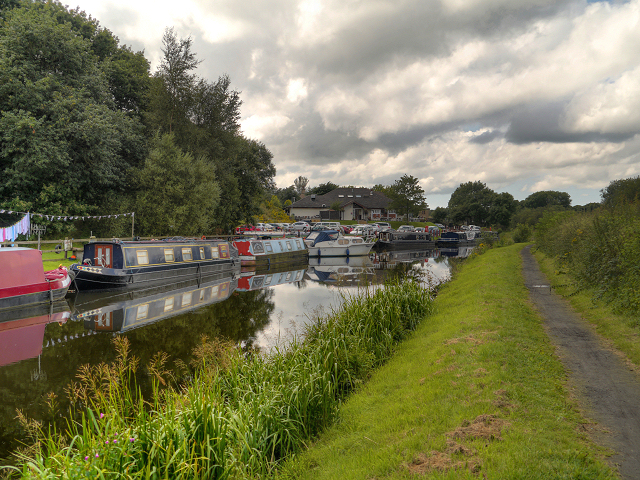
- Leeds and Liverpool Canal, Riley Green Marina

- Shown within Chorley Borough Location within Lancashire
- OS grid reference: SD621254
- Civil parish: Hoghton
- District: Chorley
- Shire county: Lancashire
- Region: North West
- Country: England
- Sovereign state: United Kingdom
- Post town: PRESTON
- Postcode district: PR5
- Dialling code: 01254
- Police: Lancashire
- Fire: Lancashire
- Ambulance: North West
- UK Parliament: Chorley

Riley Green is a hamlet, part of the civil parish of Hoghton, within the Borough of Chorley, Lancashire, England. It is located at the junction of the A675 and A6061 roads, between Preston, Blackburn and Chorley. The hamlet consists of a small number of houses and one pub - the Royal Oak on the A6061 on the A675 beside the Leeds and Liverpool Canal. Most of the surrounding area is pasture land. There is also a marina where many narrowboats are moored, and some are for hire. The original route to Hoghton Tower starts in Riley Green, however it is now only a track as a new route was built straight up to the Tower when motorised transport came to pass. The village is on the Blackburn Bus Company bus route from Burnley to Preston (route 152) and near junction 3 of the M65. Boats were formerly constructed at the Boat Yard in the village which the Boatyard pub was named after (The Boat Yard pub no longer exists following a fire). The Boatyard was refurbished by the brewery Thwaites in 2016 and reopened as the Grill and Grain but was destroyed by fire in 2017.
