= Lamb and mutton =

Meat of domestic sheep

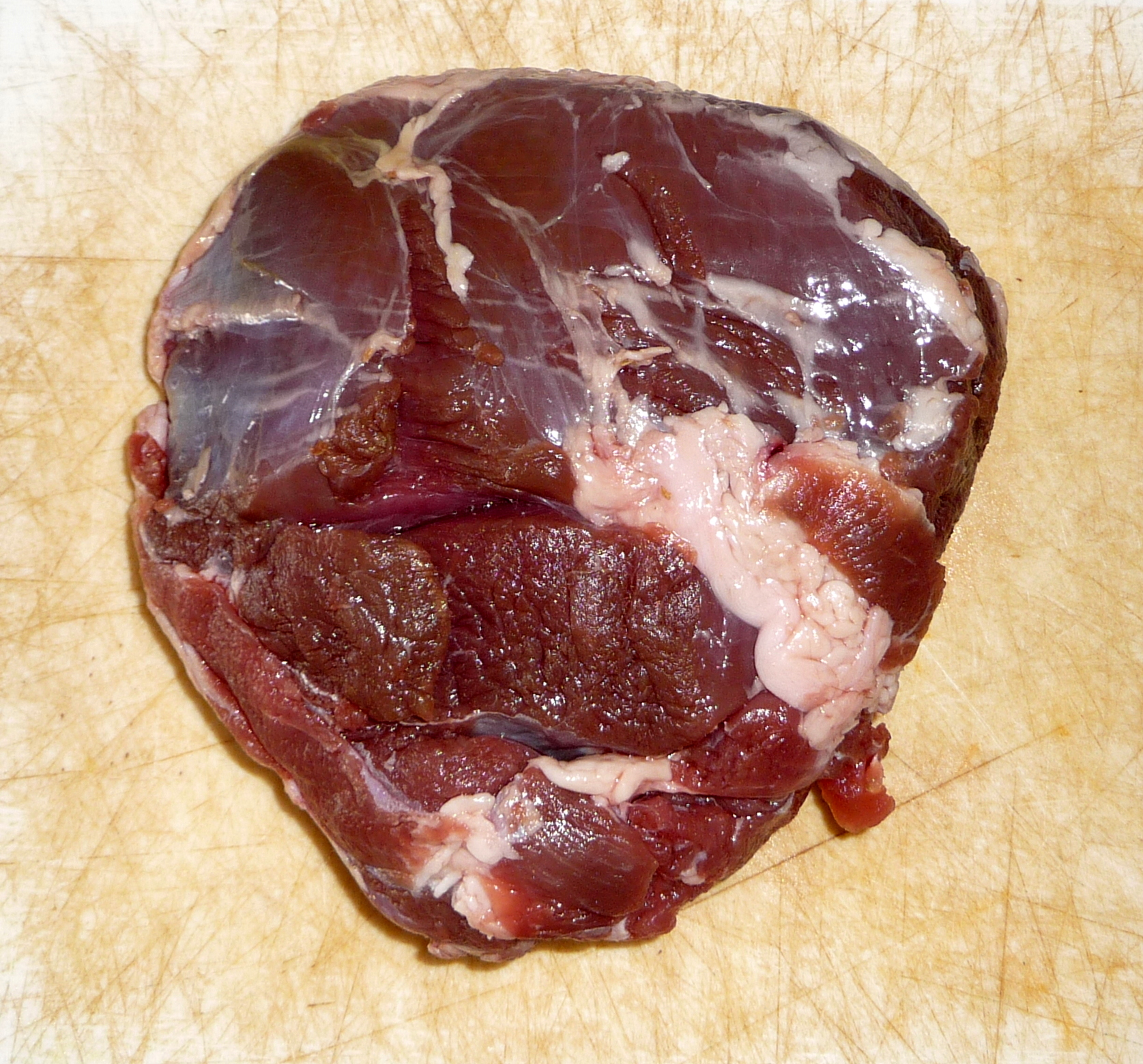
Lamb

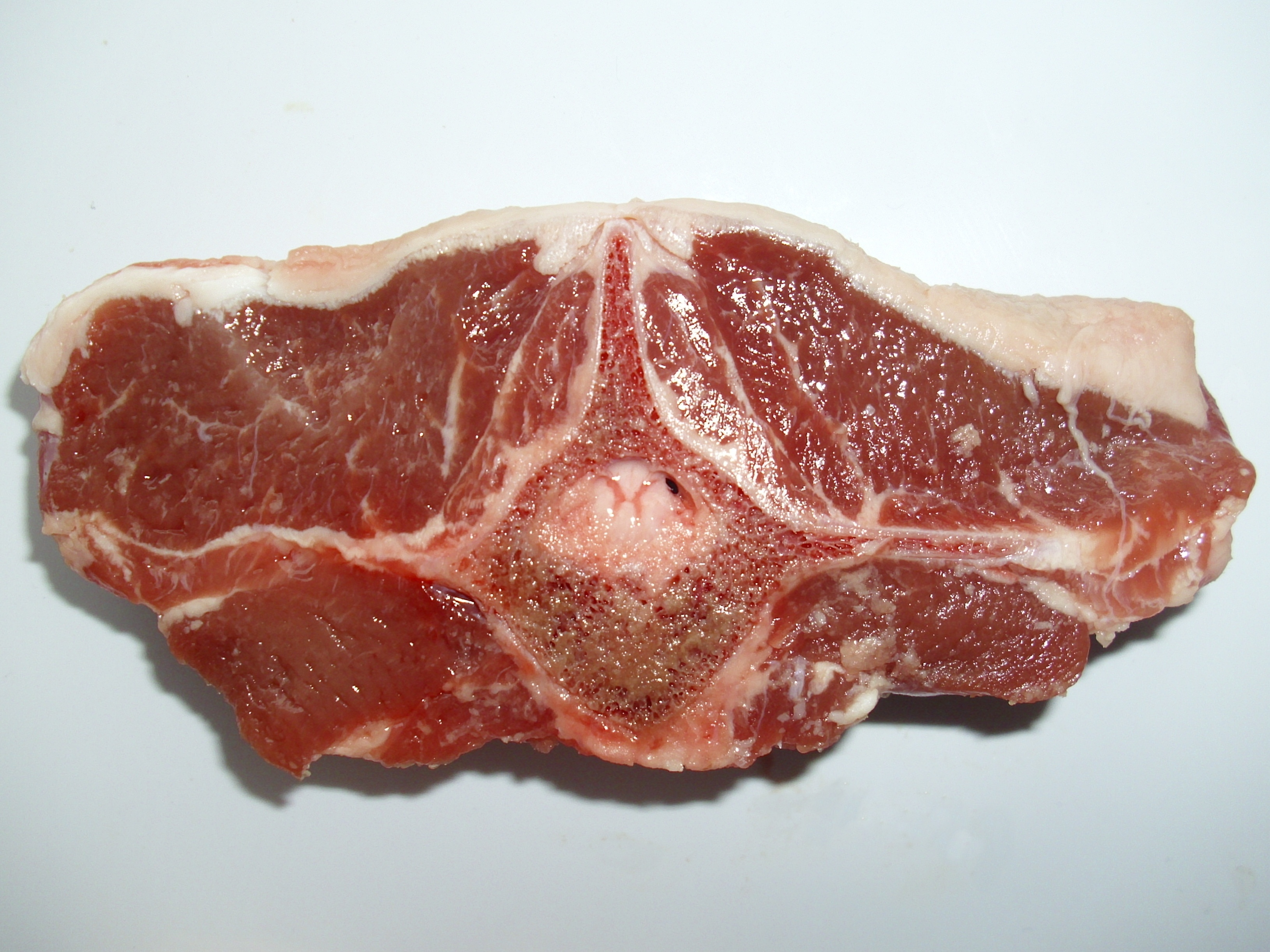
Mutton

Lamb and mutton, collectively sheep meat (or sheepmeat), is meat from the domestic sheep, Ovis aries. It is generally divided into three types: lamb, from sheep in their first year; hogget, from sheep in their second; and mutton, from older sheep. The name "mutton" comes from French language mouton, sheep.

Lamb is the most expensive of the three types, and in recent decades, sheep meat has increasingly only been retailed as "lamb", sometimes stretching the accepted distinctions given above. The stronger-tasting mutton is now hard to find in many areas, despite the efforts of the Mutton Renaissance Campaign in the UK. In Australia, the term prime lamb is often used to refer to lambs raised for meat. Other languages, such as French, Spanish, and Italian, make similar or even more detailed distinctions among sheep meats by age and sometimes by sex and diet—for example, lechazo in Spanish refers to meat from milk-fed (unweaned) lambs.

== Classifications and nomenclature ==
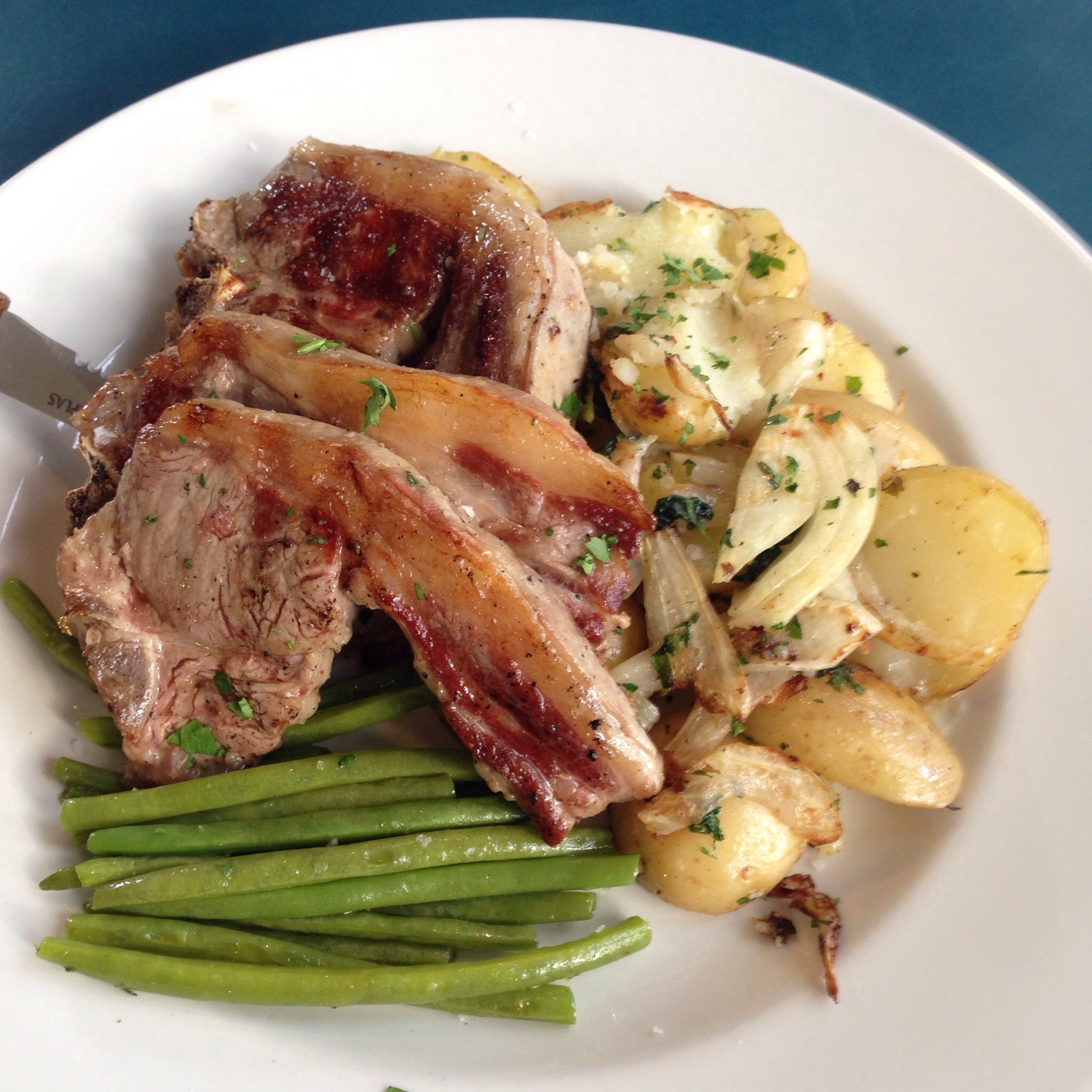
Lamb chops with new potatoes and green beans

The definitions for lamb, hogget and mutton vary considerably between countries. Younger lambs are smaller and more tender. Mutton is meat from a sheep over two years old, and has tougher flesh. In general, the darker the colour, the older the animal.

=== Britain, Australia, and New Zealand ===
Lamb
A young sheep which is less than one year old. From 1 July 2019, the Australian definition is "an ovine animal that: (a) is under 12 months of age, or (b) does not have any permanent incisor teeth in wear". This new definition meant that Australian farmers could extend the term "lamb" by another month. This followed a similar definition change in New Zealand in 2018. In Britain the definition is still "0 permanent incisor teeth". A permanent incisor tooth is said to be "in wear" if it protrudes further than the nearest milk teeth.
Hogget
A sheep of either sex having no more than two permanent incisors in wear. The term is also used to refer to meat from the aforementioned animal. In the UK, it means animals that are 11 to 24 months old, while Australian butchers use the term for animals that are 13 to 24 months old. Still common in farming usage and among speciality butchers, it is now a rare term in British, Australian and New Zealand supermarkets, where meat of all sheep less than two years old tends to be called "lamb".
Mutton
The meat of a female (ewe) or castrated male (wether) sheep having more than two permanent incisors in wear.

=== Italy ===
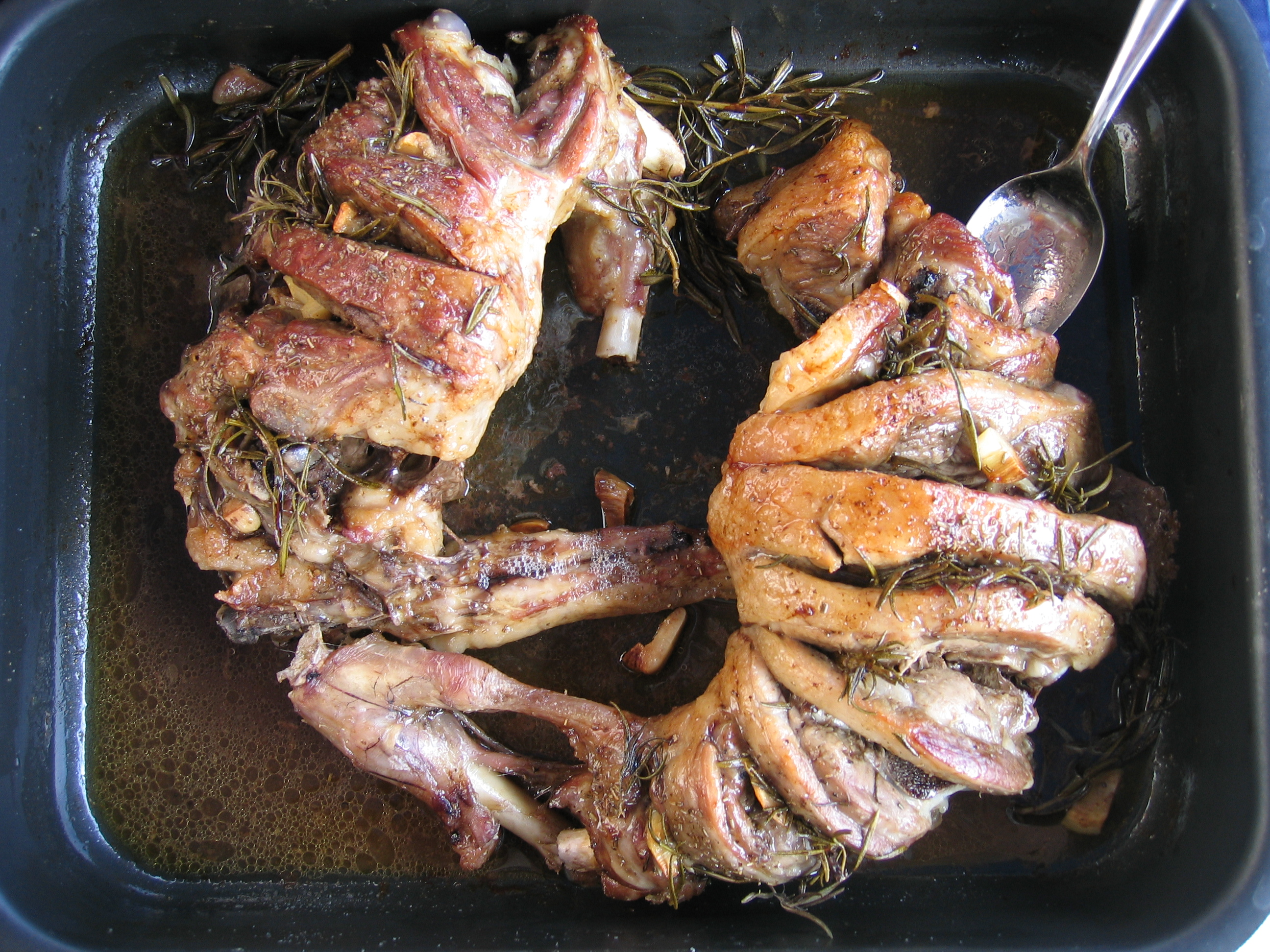
Abbacchio is consumed throughout central Italy as an Easter and Christmas dish. It is a product protected by the European Union with the PGI mark.

In the Romanesco dialect, the offspring of a sheep which is still suckling or is recently weaned is called abbacchio, while the offspring of a sheep almost a year old which has already been shorn twice is called agnello (lit. 'lamb'). This distinction exists only in the Romanesco dialect. Abbacchio is consumed throughout central Italy as an Easter and Christmas dish. It is a product protected by the European Union with the PGI mark.

Throughout central Italy, including Sardinia, pastoralism was the main source of meat. Since ancient times, abbacchio has been one of the staple foods of the Lazio region, especially for rural communities, whose consumption at the table was considerable. The tradition of consuming abbacchio spread in ancient times, when mainly adult sheep were slaughtered. The slaughter of abbacchio was forbidden except during the Easter and Christmas periods, and until June. Over the centuries, given the importance of the food, around 100 recipes for preparing lamb have been developed in Lazio. Given the importance of abbacchio in social life, historical events dedicated to abbacchio are still organized in the Lazio region today, i.e. sagre, country festivals and popular events. In ancient times, sheep was eaten during work in the countryside, while abbacchio was consumed only during the Easter holidays.

=== South and Southeast Asia ===
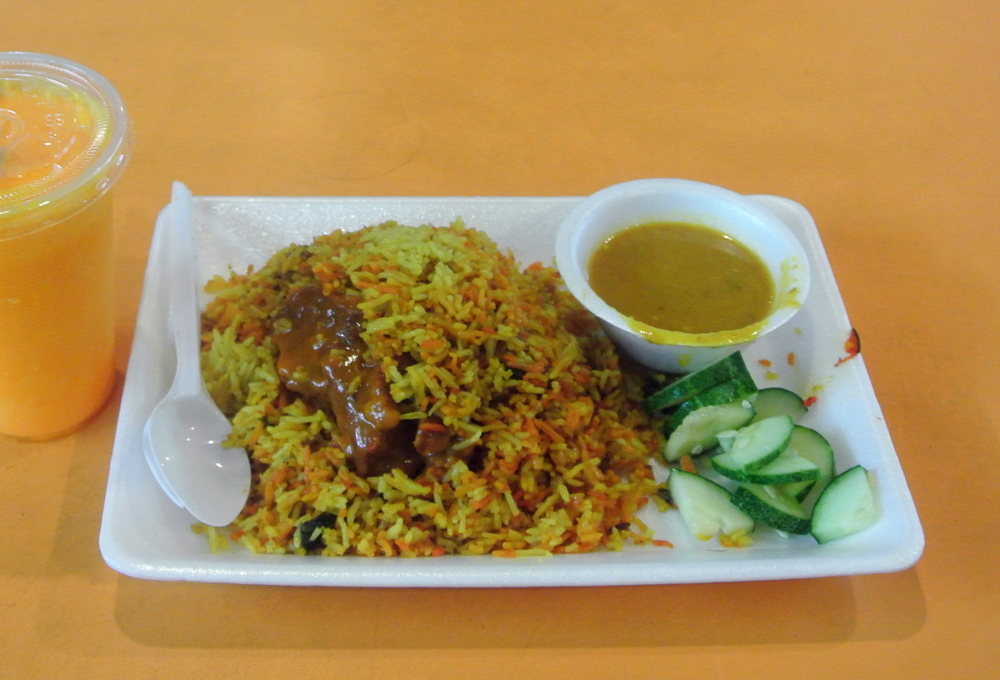
Indian-style mutton biryani

The term "mutton" is applied to goat meat in most countries of South and Southeast Asia, and the goat population has been rising. For example, mutton curry is usually made from goat meat. It is estimated that over a third of the goat population is slaughtered every year and sold as mutton.

The domestic sheep population in India and the Indian subcontinent has been in decline for over 40 years and has survived at marginal levels in mountainous regions, based on wild-sheep breeds, and mainly for wool production. However, in some Indian states such as karnataka, Andhra Pradesh, Tamil Nadu and Telangana sheep meat is also popular.

=== United States ===
In the early 1900s, mutton was widely consumed in the United States, but mutton consumption has declined since World War II. As of 2010, most sheep meat in the United States comes from animals in between 12 and 14 months old, and is called "lamb"; the term "hogget" is not used. Federal statutes and regulations dealing with food labeling in the United States permit all sheep products to be marketed as "lamb." USDA grades for lamb are only partly a function of the animal's age. Animals up to 20 months old may meet the quality of the "USDA prime" grade depending on other factors, while "USDA choice" lamb can be of any age. "Spring lamb" is defined by the USDA as having been slaughtered between March and October.

=== Other types ===
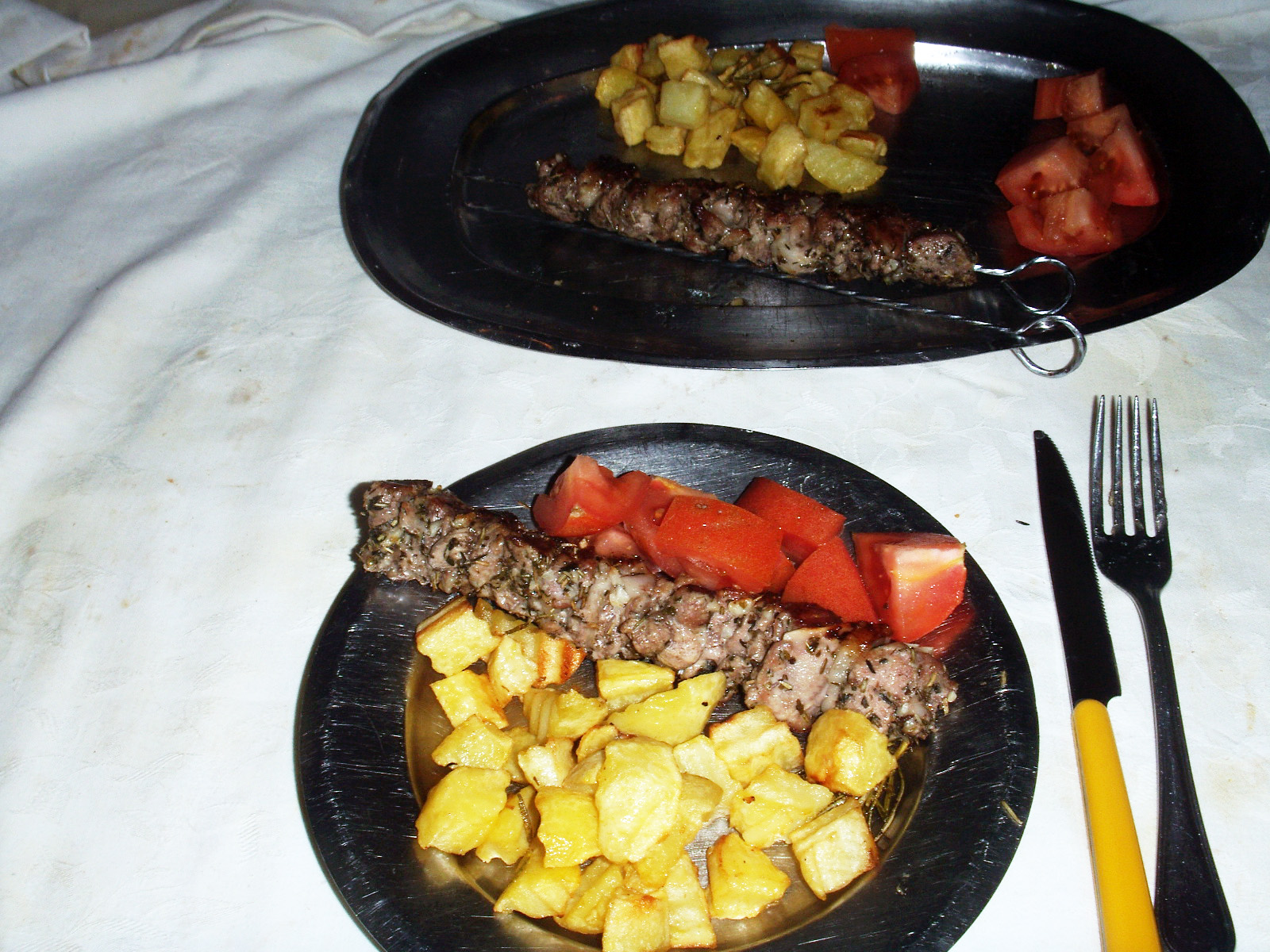
Lamb skewers with potatoes and tomatoes, Italy

Suckling lamb or milk-fed lamb
Meat from an unweaned lamb, typically 4–6 weeks old and weighing 5.5–8 kg (12–18 lb); this is typically unavailable in the United States and the United Kingdom. The flavour and texture of milk-fed lamb when grilled (such as the small lamb cutlets known as chuletillas in Spain) or roasted (lechazo asado or cordero lechal asado) is generally thought to be finer than that of older lamb, and fetches higher prices. The areas in northern Spain where this can be found include Asturias, Cantabria, Castile and León, and La Rioja. Milk-fed lambs are especially prized for Easter in Greece, when they are roasted on a spit.
Young lamb
A milk-fed lamb between six and eight weeks old
Spring lamb
A lamb, usually three to five months old, born in late winter or early spring and sold usually before 1 July (in the northern hemisphere).
Sucker lambs
A term used in Australia—includes young milk-fed lambs, as well as slightly older lambs up to about seven months of age which are also still dependent on their mothers for milk. Carcasses from these lambs usually weigh between 14 and 30 kg (31 and 66 lb). Older weaned lambs which have not yet matured to become mutton are known as old-season lambs.
Yearling lamb
a young sheep between 12 and 24 months old
Saltbush mutton
a term used in Australia for the meat of mature Merinos which have been allowed to graze on atriplex plants
Salt marsh lamb
(Also known as 'saltmarsh lamb' or by its French name, agneau de pré-salé) The meat of sheep which graze on salt marsh in coastal estuaries that are washed by the tides and support a range of salt-tolerant grasses and herbs, such as samphire, sparta grass, sorrel and sea lavender. Depending on where the salt marsh is located, the nature of the plants may be subtly different. Salt marsh lamb has long been appreciated in France and is growing in popularity in the United Kingdom. Places where salt marsh lamb are reared in the UK include Harlech and the Gower Peninsula in Wales, the Somerset Levels, Morecambe Bay and the Solway Firth.
Saltgrass lamb
A type of lamb exclusive to Flinders Island (Tasmania). The pastures on the island have a relatively high salt content, leading to a flavor and texture similar to saltmarsh lamb.

== Butchery and cookery ==
The meat of a lamb is taken from the animal between one month and one year old, with a carcass weight of between 5.5 and 30 kg (12 and 66 lb). This meat generally is more tender than that from older sheep and appears more often on tables in some Western countries. Hogget and mutton have a stronger flavour than lamb because they contain a higher concentration of species-characteristic fatty acids and are preferred by some. Mutton and hogget also tend to be tougher than lamb (because of connective tissue maturation) and are therefore better suited to casserole-style cooking, as in Lancashire hotpot, for example.

Lamb is often sorted into three kinds of meat: forequarter, loin, and hindquarter. The forequarter includes the neck, shoulder, front legs, and the ribs up to the shoulder blade. The hindquarter includes the rear legs and hip. The loin includes the ribs between the two.

Lamb chops are cut from the rib, loin, and shoulder areas. The rib chops include a rib bone; the loin chops include only a chine bone. Shoulder chops are usually considered inferior to loin chops; both kinds of chops are usually grilled. Breast of lamb (baby chops) can be cooked in an oven.

Leg of lamb is a whole leg; saddle of lamb is the two loins with the hip. Leg and saddle are usually roasted, though the leg is sometimes boiled.

Forequarter meat of sheep, as of other mammals, includes more connective tissue than some other cuts, and, if not from a young lamb, is best cooked slowly using either a moist method, such as braising or stewing, or by slow roasting or American barbecuing. It is, in some countries, sold already chopped or diced.

Mutton barbeque is a tradition in Western Kentucky. The area was strong in the wool trade, which gave them plenty of older sheep that needed to be put to use.

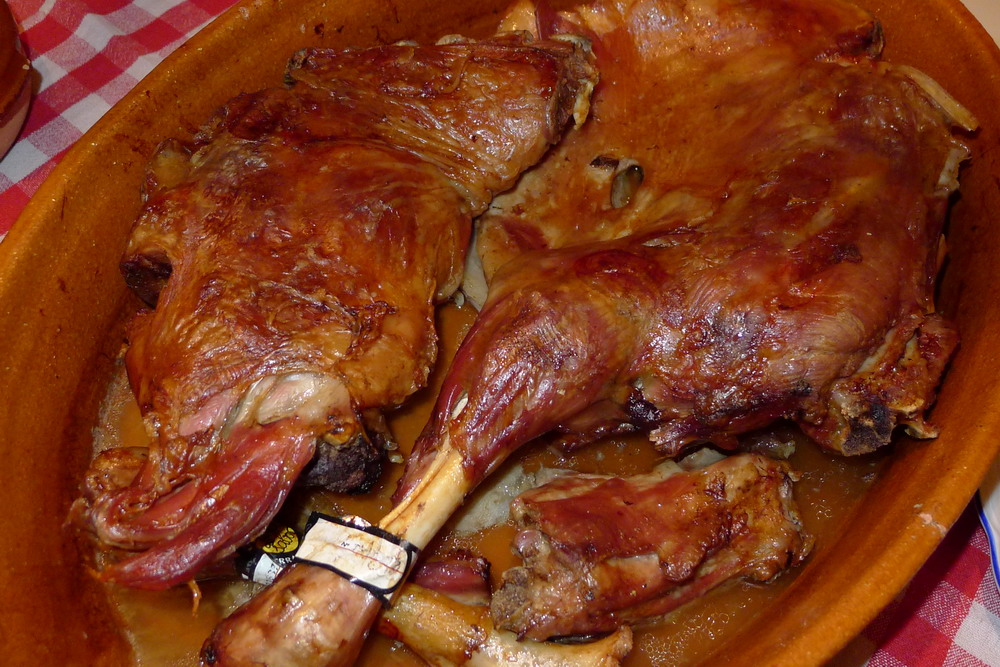
Lechazo asado (roast lamb) is a typical dish from the province of Valladolid and other Castilian provinces in Spain.

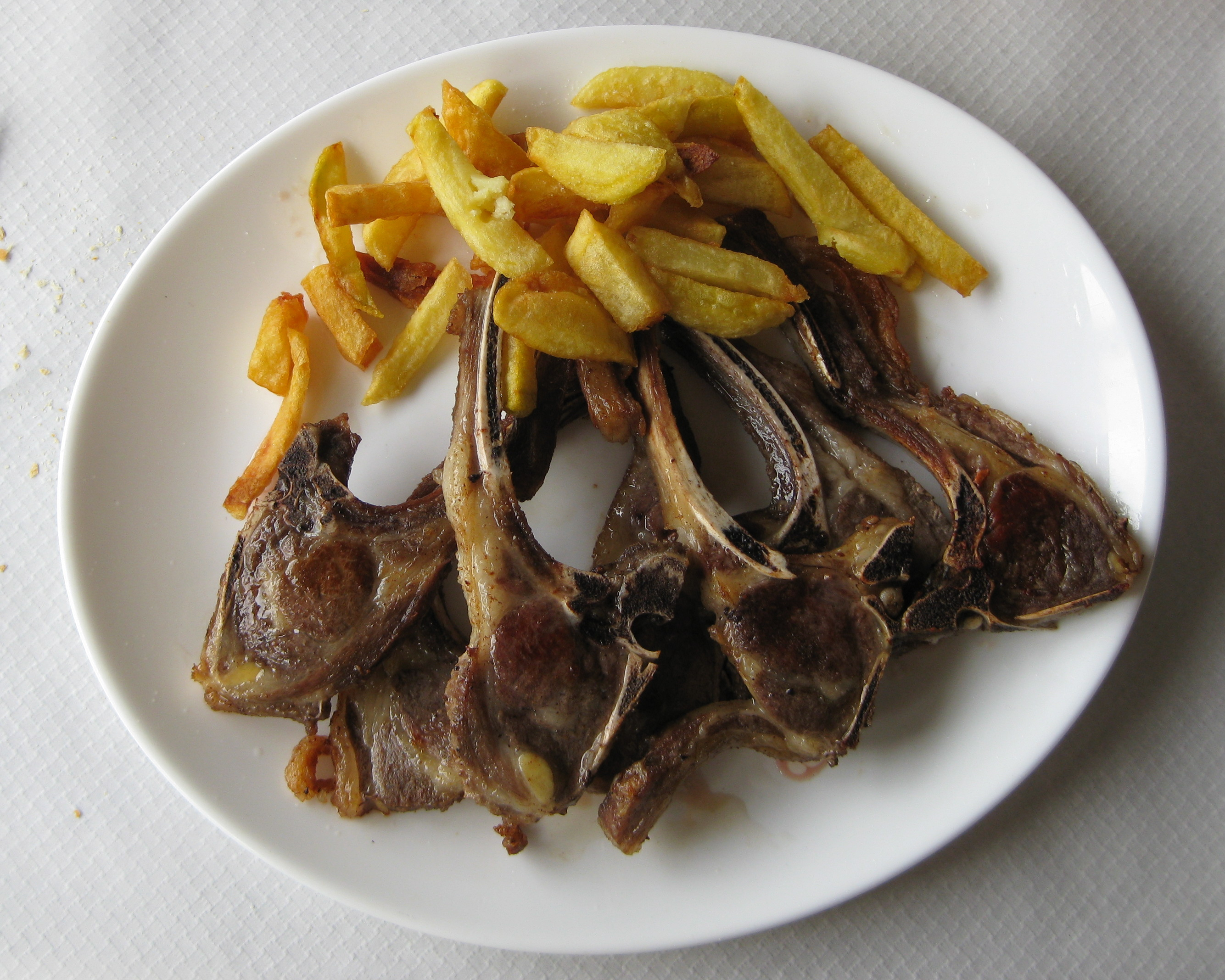
Chuletillas of milk-fed lamb in Asturias

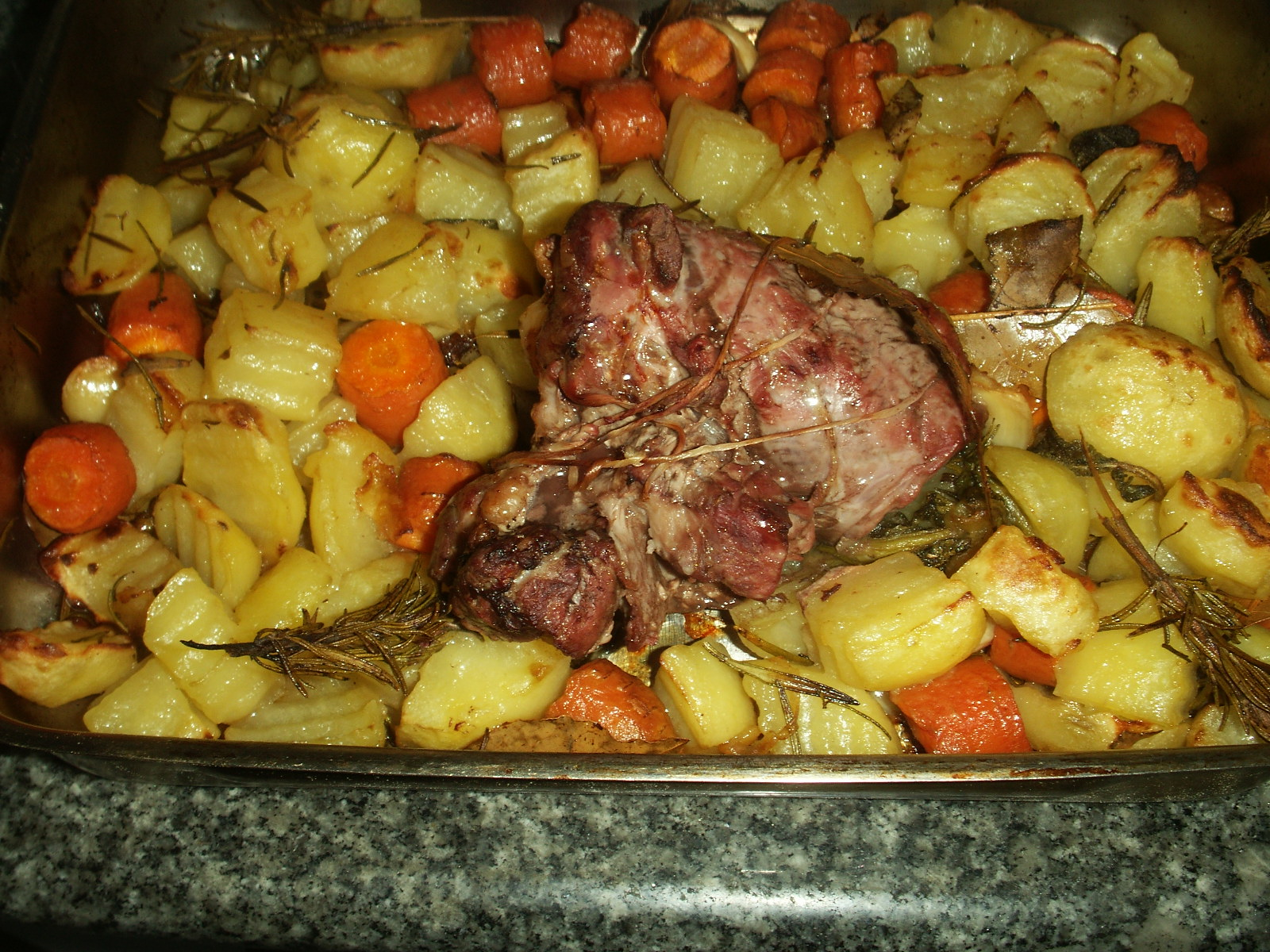
Cooked boneless leg of lamb with potatoes and carrots, Italy

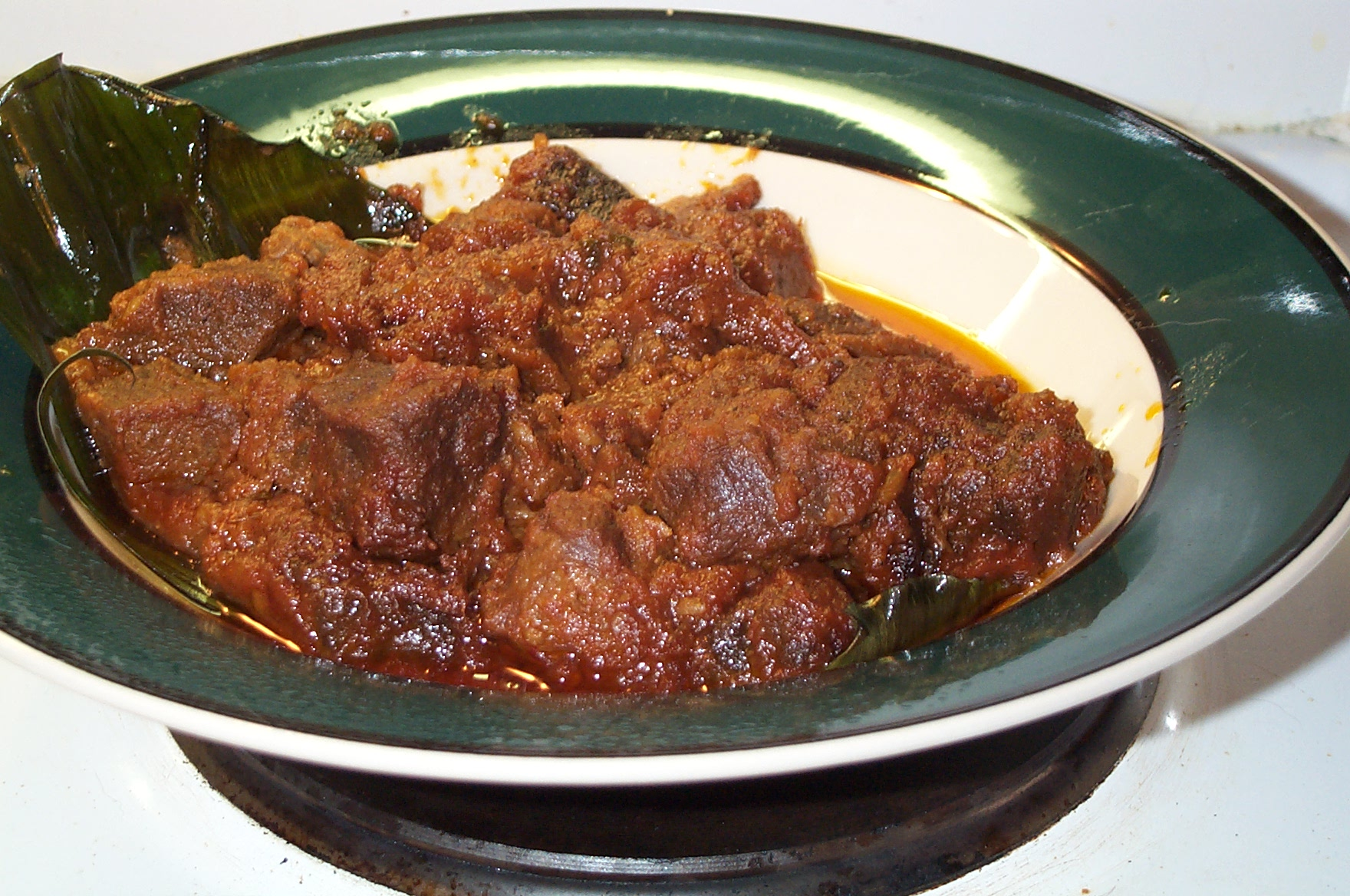
Lamb rendang

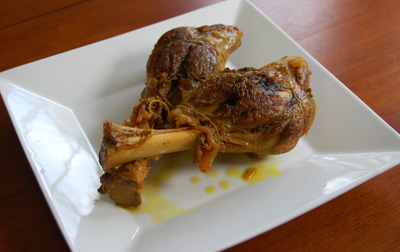
Lamb shanks of a young lamb

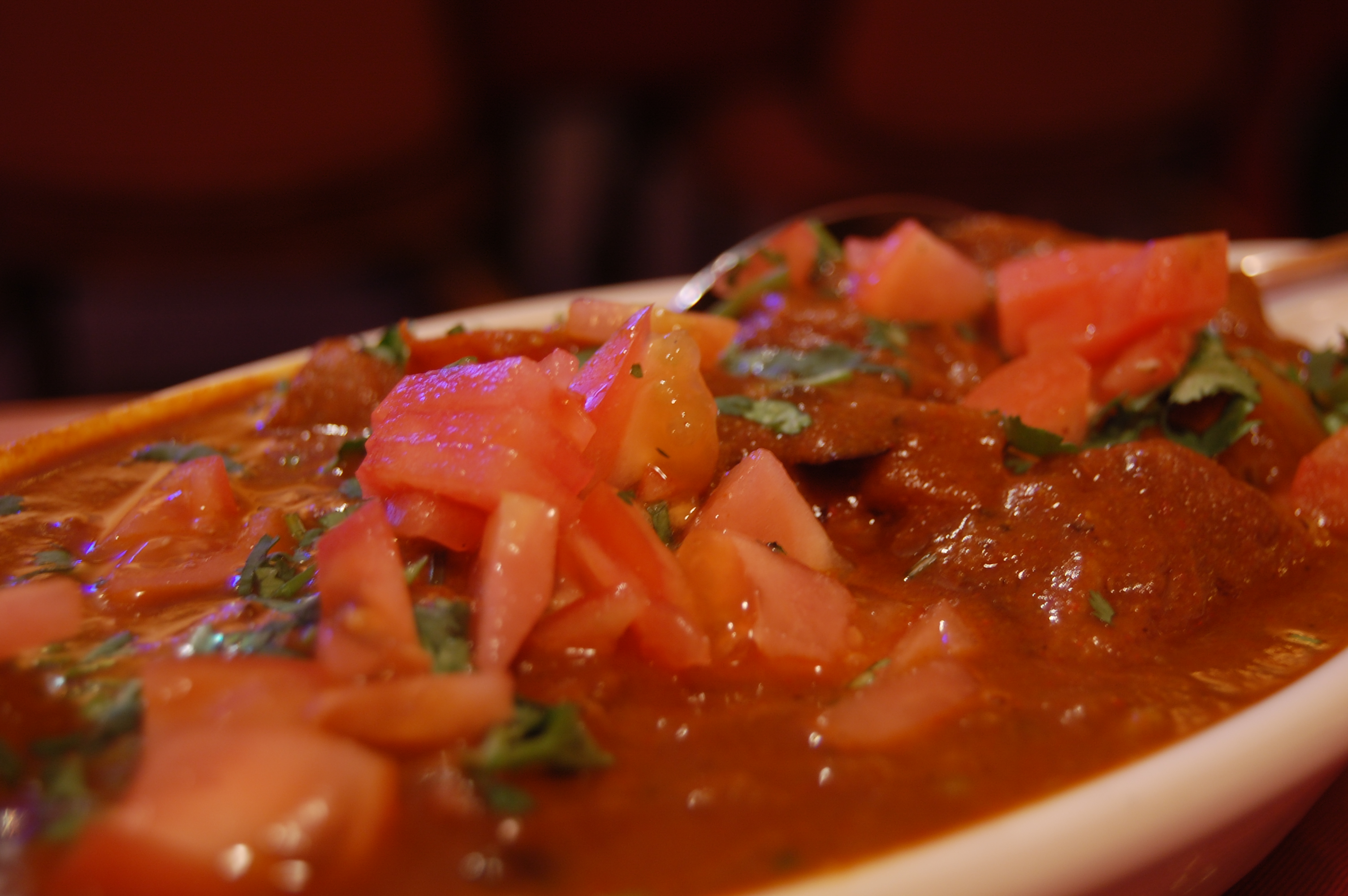
Mutton rogan josh from India

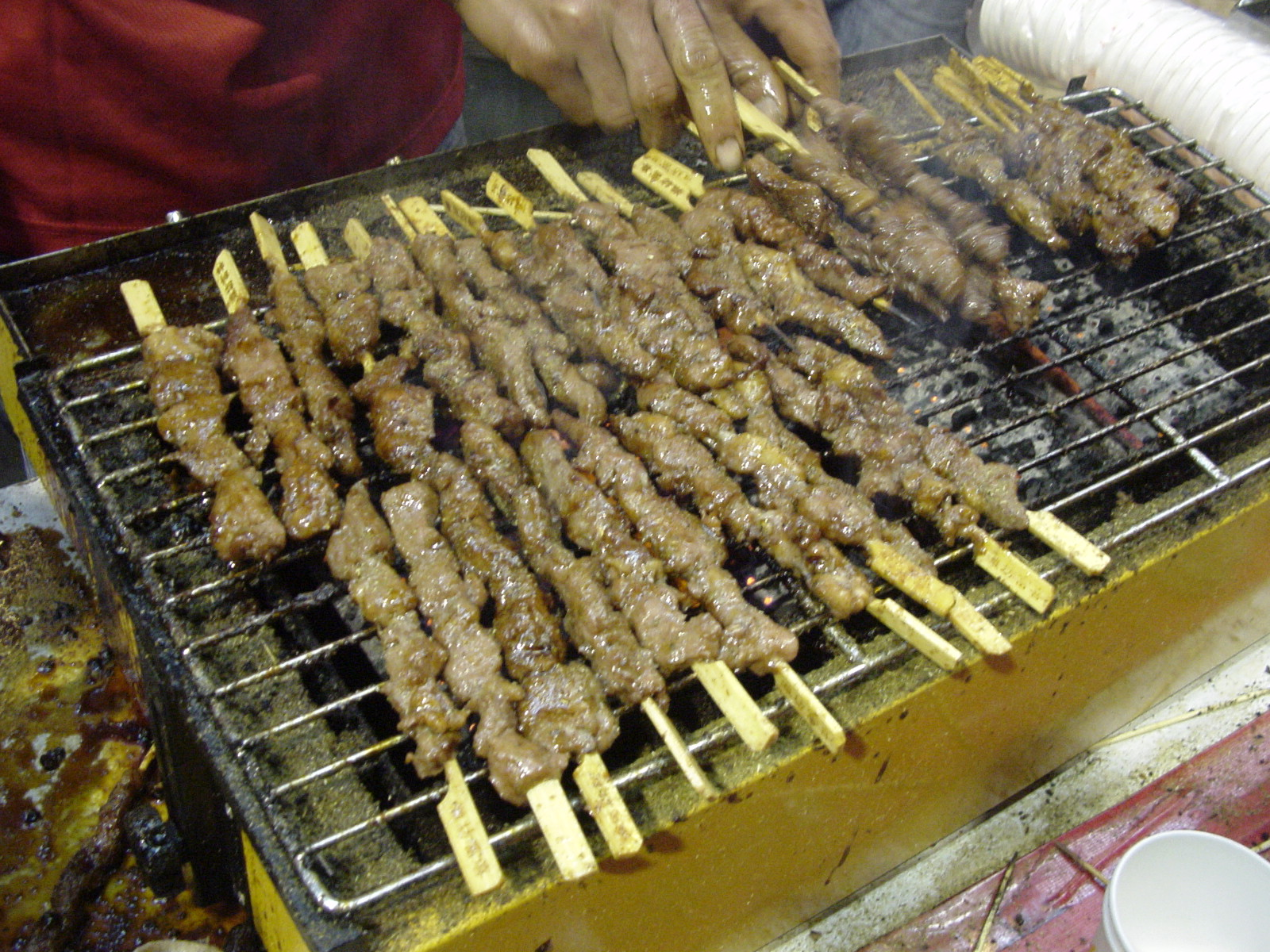
Lamb chuanr (Uyghur grilled lamb kebabs)

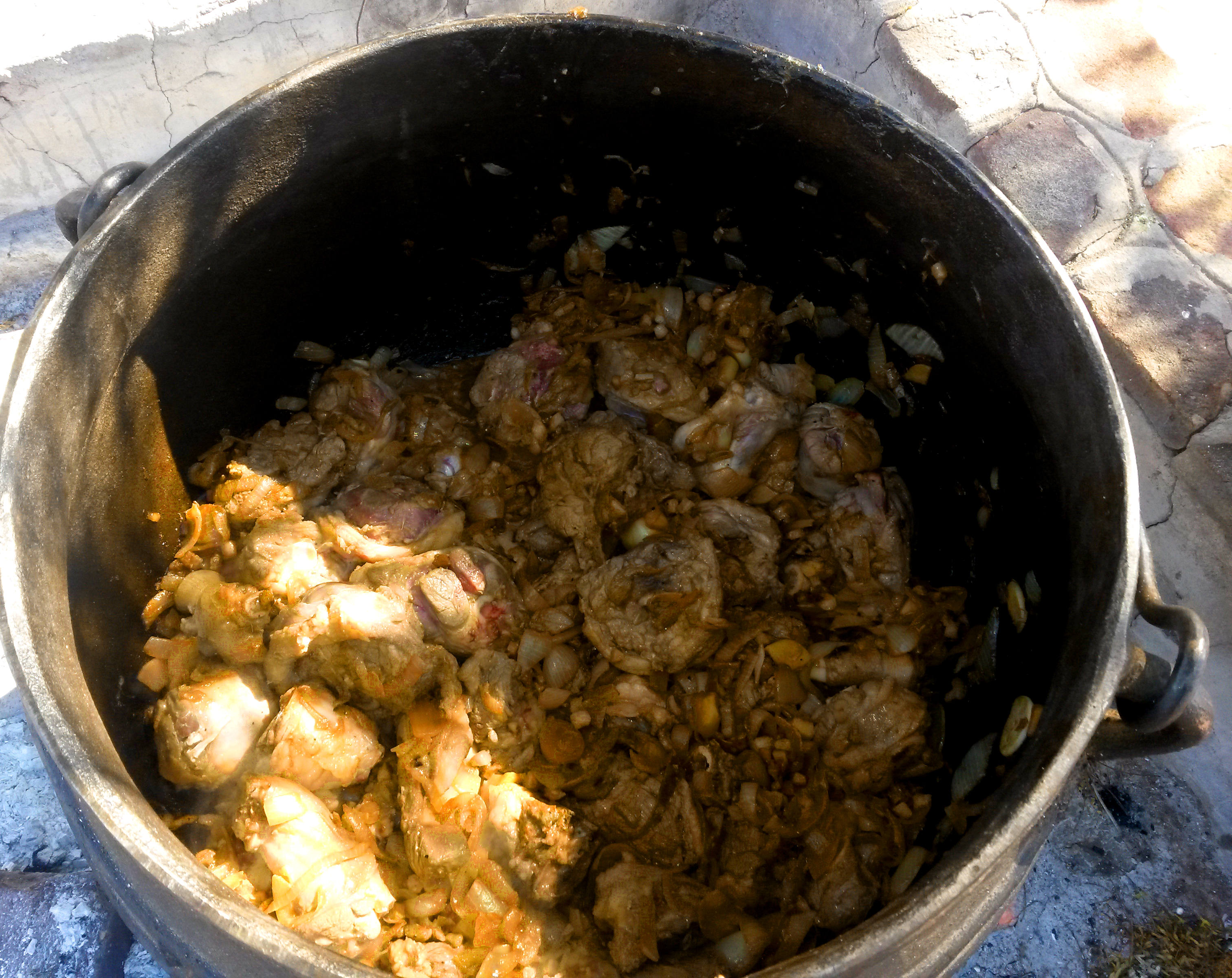
Lamb shanks cooked on an open fire in Aroab, Namibia

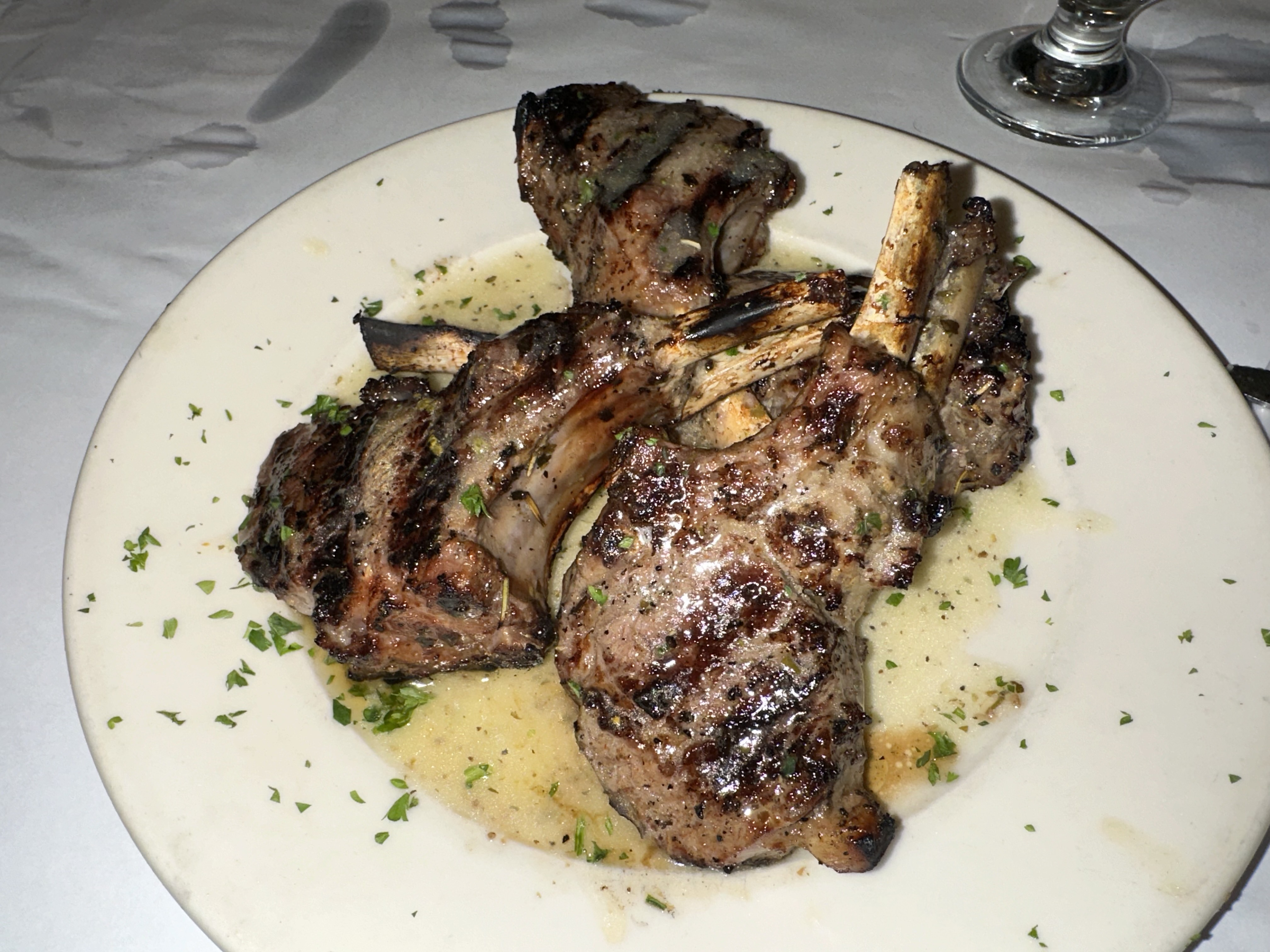
A plate of lamb chops from a Greek restaurant in Fort Lauderdale, Florida

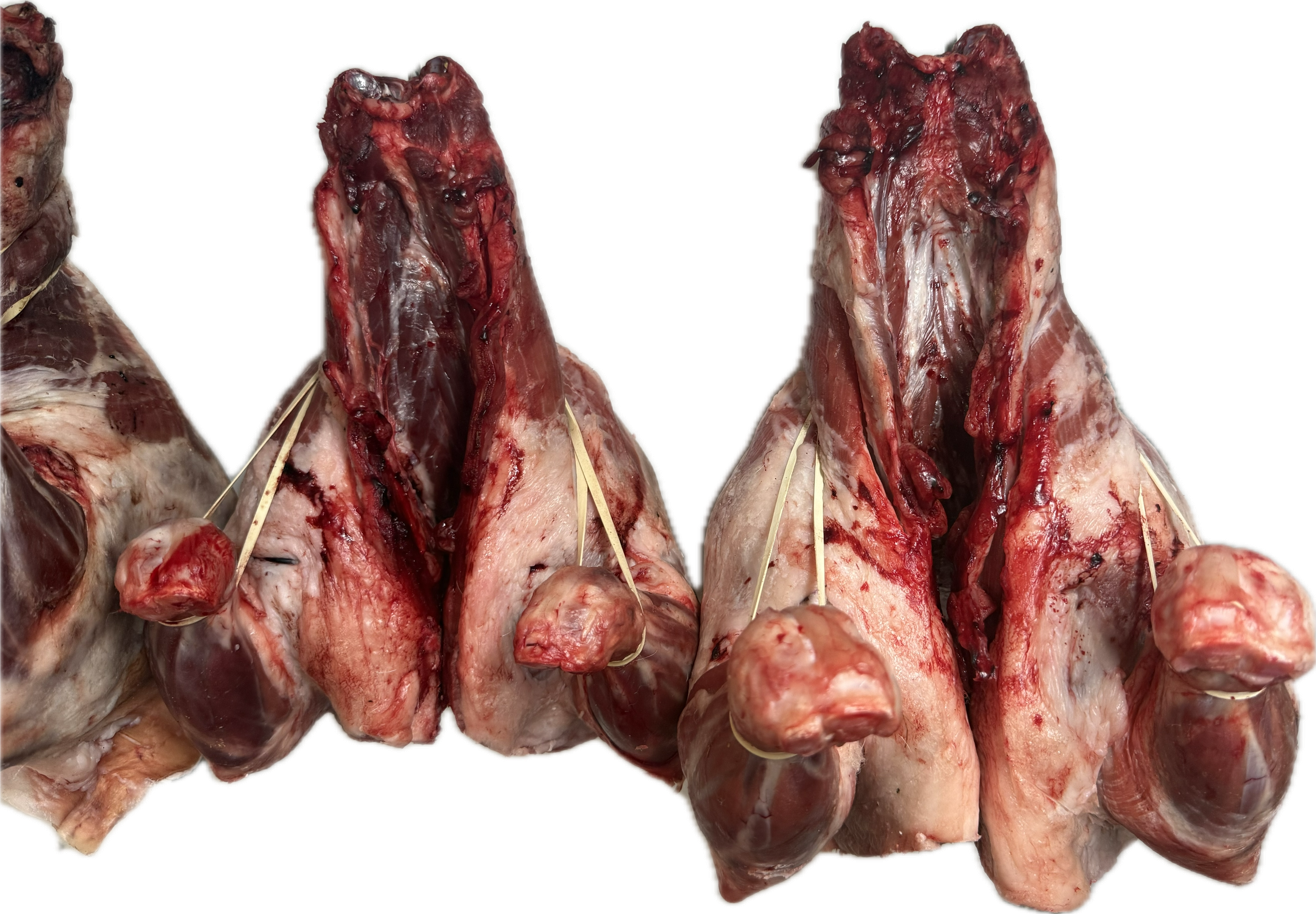
Forequarters of lamb

== Cuts ==
=== UK, Canada, and other Commonwealth countries ===
British cuts of lamb

Approximate zones of the usual UK cuts of lamb:

- Scrag end (of neck)
- Middle neck
- Best End (of neck)
- Loin
- Chump (and chump chops)
- Barnsley chop, a large double loin chop.
- Leg (gigot in Scotland)
- Shank
- Shoulder
- Breast

=== US and Ireland ===
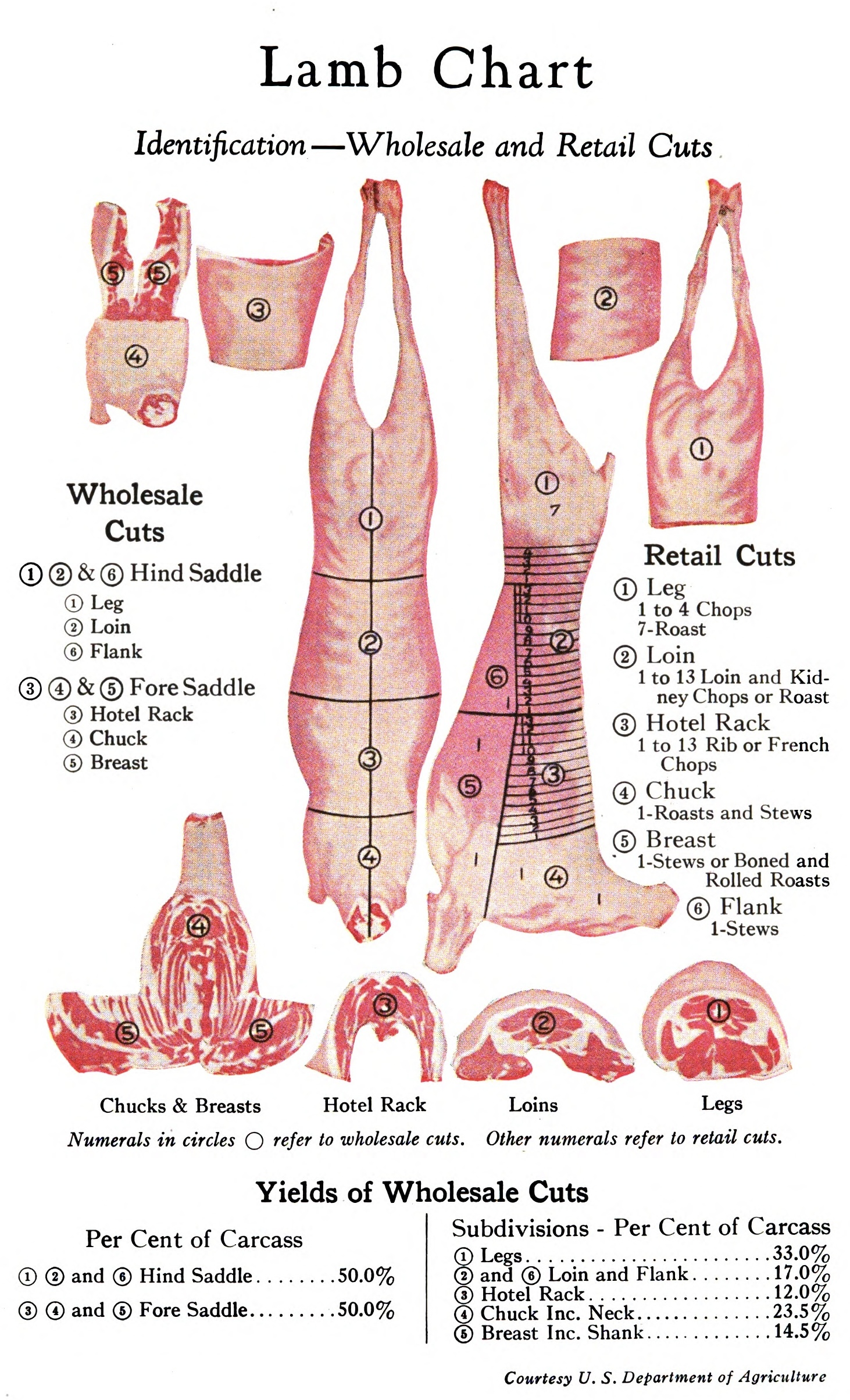
Cuts of lamb (United States, 1927)

- Square cut shoulder – shoulder roast, shoulder chops and arm chops
- Rack – rib chops and riblets, rib roast
- Loin – loin chops or roast
- Leg – sirloin chops, leg roast (leg of lamb)
- Neck
- Breast
- Shanks (fore or hind)
- Flank

=== New Zealand ===
- Forequarter
  - Neck – neck chops
  - Shoulder – shoulder chops, shoulder roast (usually boned and rolled)
  - Rib-eye
  - Breast
  - Knuckle
- Loin
  - Rib-loin – racks, frenched cutlets, spare ribs
  - Mid-loin – striploin (backstrap), loin chops
  - Tenderloin
  - Flap
- Full leg – leg roast (may be boned and rolled), leg chops. A short-cut leg is a full leg without the chump; a carvery leg is a short-cut leg without the thick flank
  - Chump (rump) – chump chops, rump steak
  - Thick flank (knuckle) – schnitzel
  - Topside and silverside – steaks
  - Shank

== Production and consumption ==
=== Consumption ===
Per capita production of lamb and mutton meat

According to the OECD-FAO Agricultural Outlook for 2016, the top consumers of sheep meat in 2015 were as follows: EU countries are not individually surveyed in this list. Among EU nations, Greece is the per capita leader in consumption at 12.3 kg, with Cyprus following right after, while the UK's annual per capita lamb consumption is 4.7 kg. Outside of the OECD, the largest per capita consumer overall is Mongolia, with 45.1 kg.

=== Production ===
The table below gives a sample of producing nations, but many other significant producers in the 50–120 kt range are not given.

Sheep meat production (kt)
	2008	2009	2010	2011	2012
World	8,415	8,354	8,229	8,348	8,470
Algeria	179	197	205	253	261
Australia	660	635	556	513	556
Brazil	79	80	82	84	85
China	1,978	2,044	2,070	2,050	2,080
France	130	126	119	115	114
Germany	38	38	38	39	36
Greece	91	90	90	90	90
India	275	286	289	293	296
Indonesia	113	128	113	113	113
Iran	170	114	90	104	126
Kazakhstan	110	116	123	128	128
New Zealand	598	478	471	465	448
Nigeria	145	149	171	172	174
Russia	156	164	167	171	173
Turkey	278	262	240	253	272
Turkmenistan	124	128	130	130	133
United Kingdom	326	307	277	289	275
United States	81	80	76	69	72
Source: Helgi Library, World Bank, FAOSTAT

Production of lamb and mutton meat

Production of lamb and mutton meat per animal

== Dishes ==
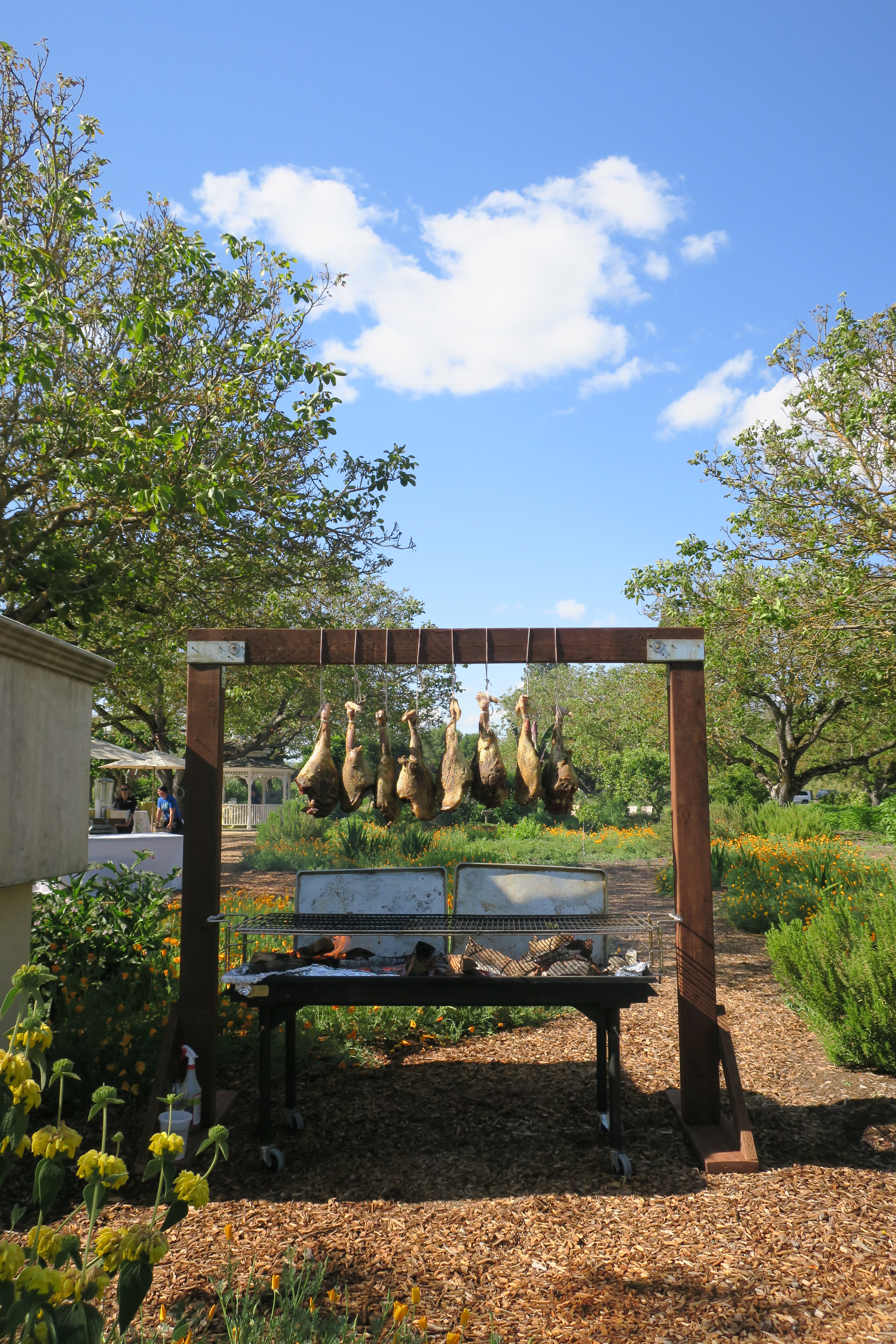
Lamb legs grilling over an open fire at Kendall-Jackson Wine Estate

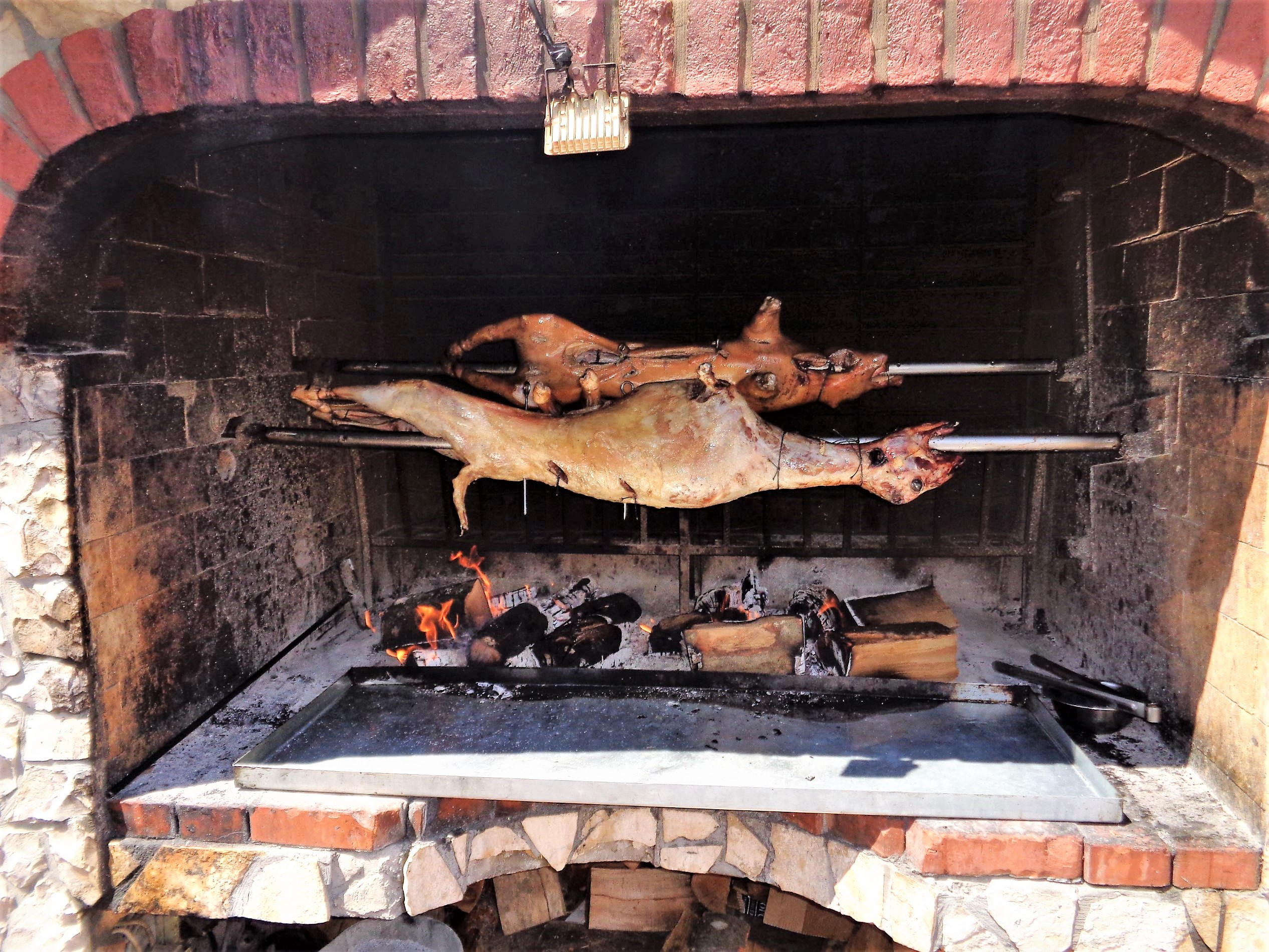
Lamb, in front, being roasted on a roasting spit in Novalja, island of Pag, Croatia

Meat from sheep features prominently in the cuisines of several Mediterranean cultures including Greece, Croatia, Turkey, North Africa, Jordan, and the Middle East, as well as in the cuisines of Iran and Afghanistan. In Greece, for example, it is an integral component of many meals and of religious feasts such as Easter, like avgolemono and magiritsa. It is also popular in the Basque culture, both in the Basque country of Europe and in shepherding parts of the Western United States, where shepherds of Basque descent have been active since the 1850s.

In the United States, the Navajo have incorporated mutton and lamb into their traditional cuisine since the introduction of sheep by Spanish explorers and settlers in the 17th century, replacing wild turkey and venison and creating a pastoral culture. In Northern Europe, mutton and lamb feature in many traditional dishes, including those of Iceland, Norway and the United Kingdom.

Mutton is popular in Australia. Lamb and mutton are very popular in Central Asia and in certain parts of China, where other red meats may be eschewed for religious or economic reasons. Barbecued mutton is also a specialty in some areas of the United States, chiefly Owensboro, Kentucky, and Canada. Meat from sheep is generally consumed far less in the US than in many European, Central American and Asian cuisines. Average per-capita consumption of lamb in the United States is only 400 grams (14 oz) per year.

In Australia, the leg of lamb roast is considered to be the national dish. Commonly served on a Sunday or any other special occasion, it can be done in a kettle BBQ or a conventional oven. Typical preparation involves covering the leg of lamb with butter, pushing rosemary sprigs into incisions cut in the leg, and sprinkling rosemary leaves on top. The lamb is then roasted for two hours at 180 °C (350 °F) and typically served with carrots and potato (also roasted), green vegetables and gravy.

In Indonesia, lamb is popularly served as lamb satay and lamb curry. Both dishes are cooked with various spices from the islands, and served with either rice or lontong. A version of lamb and bamboo shoot curry is the specialty of Minang cuisine, although similar dishes can be found in Thai cuisine.

In Mexico, lamb is the meat of choice for barbacoa, in which the lamb is roasted or steamed wrapped in maguey leaves underground.

In Japan, although lamb is not traditionally consumed in most of the country, on the northern island of Hokkaido and in the northeastern Tohoku regions, a hot-pot dish called jingisukan (i.e. "Genghis Khan") is popular. In that dish, thin-sliced lamb is cooked over a convex skillet alongside various vegetables and mushrooms in front of the diners, then dipped in soy-sauce-based dipping sauces and eaten. It was so named because lamb is popular in Mongolia (see "Sheep meat consumption" above).

=== Organ meats/offal ===
Lamb's liver, known as lamb's fry in New Zealand and Australia, is eaten in many countries. It is the most common form of offal eaten in the UK, traditionally used in the family favourite and pub grub staple of liver with onions, potentially also with bacon and mashed potatoes. It is a major ingredient, along with the lungs and heart (the pluck), in the traditional Scottish dish of haggis.

Lamb testicles or lamb fries are a delicacy in many parts of the world.

Lamb kidneys are found in many cuisines across Europe and the Middle East, often split into two halves and grilled (on kebabs in the Middle East), or sautéed in a sauce. They are generally the most highly regarded of all kidneys.

Lamb sweetbreads are a delicacy in many cuisines.

== Nutrition and health effects ==
Lamb and mutton are forms of red meat. Red meat is a good source of protein, iron, zinc, and vitamins B_{1}, B_{2}, B_{6}, and B_{12}. According to the International Agency for Research on Cancer (IARC), unprocessed red meat probably leads to an increased risk of cancer, particularly colorectal cancer. Studies have also linked red meat with higher risks of cardiovascular disease and type 2 diabetes. If meat is processed, such as by salting, curing, or smoking, health risks further increase. The World Cancer Research Fund recommends limiting red meat to no more than three servings per week.

== Environmental impact ==
Mean land use of different foods
Food Types	Land Use (m^{2}year per 100g protein)
Beef	50
Lamb and Mutton	20
Cheese	11
Pork	7.6
Farmed Fish	6
Poultry	5.7
Eggs	4.2
Tofu	2
Groundnuts	1.2
Peas	0.4

Sheep have the second highest emissions intensity of any agricultural commodity.

Production of lamb emits more greenhouse gas per gram of protein than other common foods, except for beef.

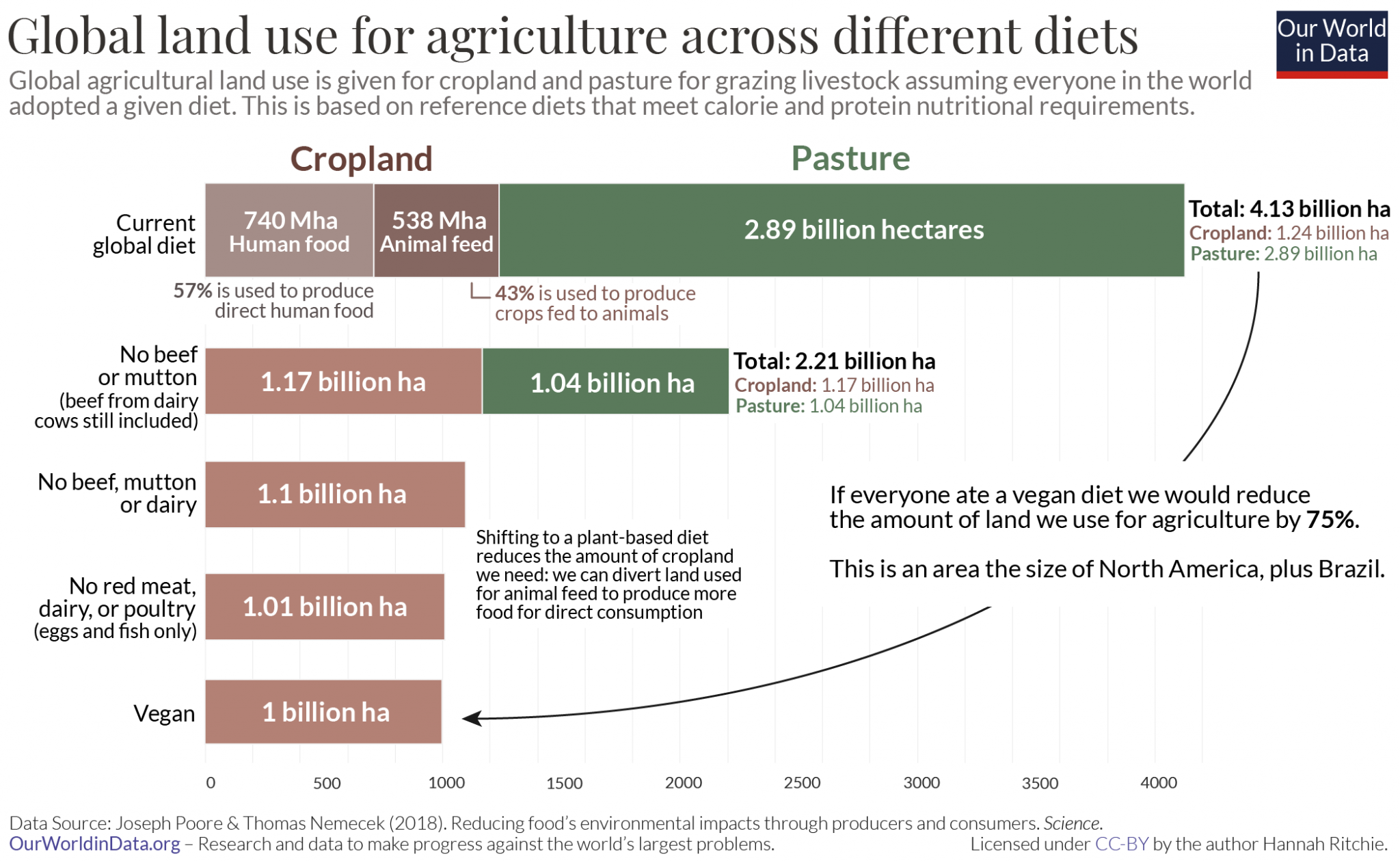
The amount of agricultural land needed globally would be reduced by almost half if no beef or mutton were eaten.

== See also ==
- Lechazo de Castilla y León – milk-fed lamb meat from Spain
- List of lamb dishes
- Mutton curry
- Mutton flaps
- Goat meat
- Sheep's trotters
- Smalahove – a Western Norwegian dish of sheep head

== Bibliography ==
- K.F. Warner, "Boning Lamb Cuts", Leaflet 74, U.S. Department of Agriculture, Bureau of Animal Industry, June 1931. full text.
- Bob Kennard, "Much ado about mutton". Ludlow: Merlin Unwin, 2014.
