= James Miller (VC 1916) =

Recipient of the Victoria Cross

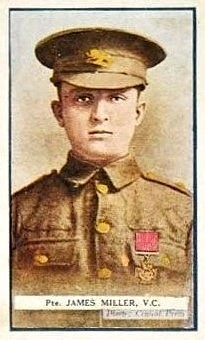
- Miller depicted in a cigarette card
- Born: 13 March 1890; Hoghton, Lancashire, England
- Died: 31 July 1916 (aged 26); Bazentin-le-Petit, France
- Burial place: Dartmoor Cemetery, France
- Military career
- Allegiance: United Kingdom
- Branch: British Army
- Service years: 1914–1916 †
- Rank: Private
- Units: King's Own (Royal Lancaster) Regiment
- Conflicts: World War I: Battle of the Somme †
- Awards: Victoria Cross

James Miller VC (13 March 1890 – 31 July 1916) was an English recipient of the Victoria Cross, the highest and most prestigious award for gallantry in the face of the enemy that can be awarded to British and Commonwealth forces.

== Biography ==
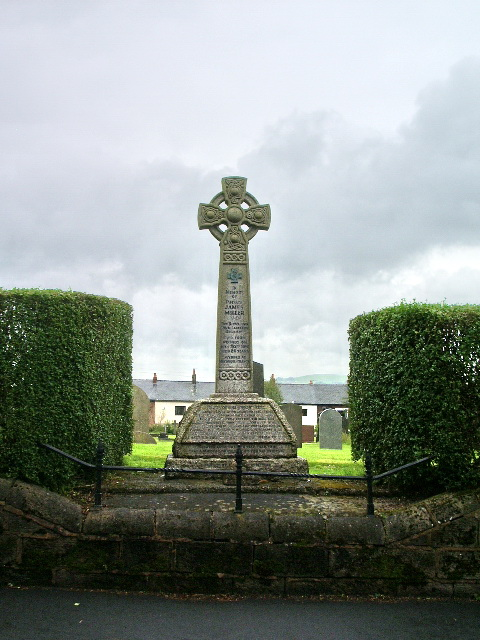
Memorial to Miller in Withnell, Lancs

Miller was born on 13 March 1890 in Hoghton, Lancashire. He worked at a paper mill until the outbreak of the First World War when, in September 1914, he joined the army. He went to France in July 1915 with the King's Own (Royal Lancaster) Regiment and saw action that autumn at the Battle of Loos. His battalion then took part in the Battle of the Somme from early July 1916.

Miller was a 26 years old private in the 7th Battalion, The King's Own (Royal Lancaster) Regiment during the First World War when the following deed took place on 30/31 July 1916 at Bazentin-le-Petit, France for which he was awarded the VC:

For most conspicuous bravery. His battalion was consolidating a position after its capture by assault. Private Miller was ordered to take an important message under heavy shell and rifle fire and to bring back a reply at all costs. He was compelled to cross the open, and on leaving the trench was shot almost immediately in the back, the bullet coming out through his abdomen. In spite of this, with heroic courage and self-sacrifice, he compressed with his hand the gaping wound in his abdomen, delivered his message, staggered back with the answer, and fell at the feet of the officer to whom he delivered it. He gave his life with a supreme devotion to duty.

Miller is buried in Dartmoor Cemetery, Bécordel-Bécourt, France. In 1917 a memorial to him was erected in Withnell churchyard, his family's local church, in the town where he worked as a paper mill worker. It was funded by public subscription. In 2024 the memorial was given Grade II listed status.

His Victoria Cross is displayed at The King's Own Royal (Lancaster) Regiment Museum, Lancaster, England.

== Bibliography ==
- Gliddon, Gerald (2011) [1991]. Somme 1916. VCs of the First World War. Stroud, Gloucestershire: The History Press. ISBN 978-0-7524-6303-2.
