= Sheila Dillon =

British food journalist

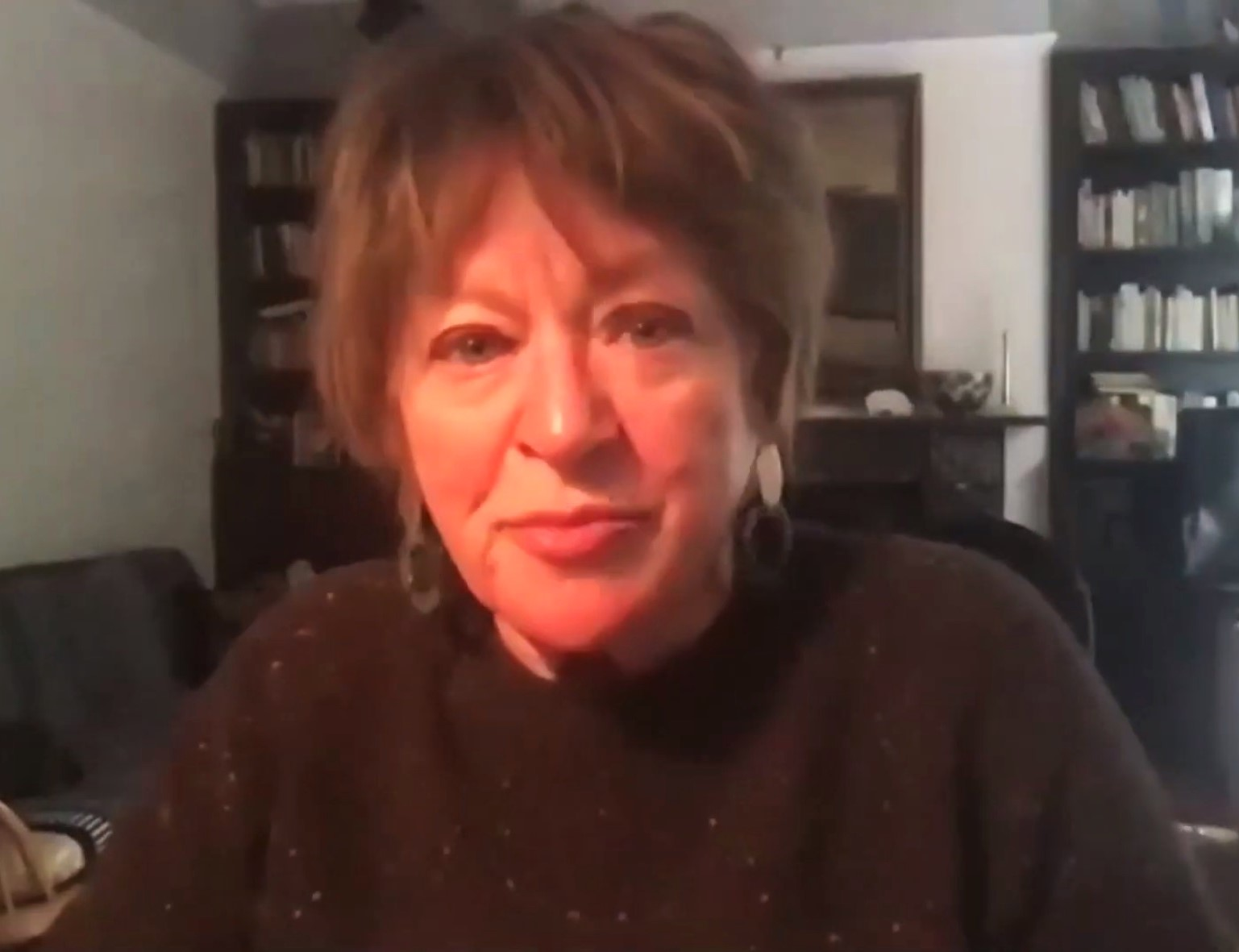
- Dillon speaks to the British Library in 2020
- Born: Hoghton, Lancashire
- Occupation: Food journalist

Sheila Dillon is a British food journalist who began her career writing for the New York food magazine Food Monitor. She is known as a presenter of BBC Radio 4's The Food Programme, on which she has appeared for more than 20 years. Dillon has been the programme's regular presenter since 2001.

== Early life and education ==
Dillon was born in Hoghton, Lancashire, and grew up in the 1950s and 1960s. She is from a farming background and went to a Roman Catholic primary school. Her grandfather was a head joiner on the Hoghton Tower Estate. Her mother worked as a weaver and her father was a barber who came from a farming family in County Tyrone, Northern Ireland. She has one younger sister, Sandra, and a younger brother, Eddie.

Dillon studied English at Leicester University where she wrote for the university newspaper. At university she became involved in the women's movement.

== Career ==
After university, Dillon spent a year in Finland with the British Council. She then undertook postgraduate work in the American Midwest before getting a job in publishing at the Indiana University Press. During her time at Little Brown & Co Publishers, she was involved in a landmark sex discrimination case pertaining to issues of equal pay which helped change discriminatory employment practices in the USA.

Working with Derek Cooper, Dillon was responsible for coverage of Bovine spongiform encephalopathy (BSE), GM and food irradiation which helped establish food as an important, newsworthy subject. She has been the presenter of Radio 4’s The Food Programme since taking over from Derek Cooper. She hosts the annual BBC Radio Food and Farming Awards.

== Awards and honours ==
Dillon has won awards for her work, including the Glaxo Science Prize, the Caroline Walker Award and several Glenfiddich Awards. In 2008, she was awarded an honorary degree by City University for her work, which, the citation says, "has changed the way in which we think about food." She is a patron of Oxford Gastronomic.

In 2010, Dillon received an "Outstanding Achievement Award" from Observer Food Monthly magazine and was one of the "100 Leading Influential Ladies".

== Personal life ==
Dillon was diagnosed with multiple myeloma, a cancer of the bone marrow, in December 2011. She has become increasingly interested in the link between diet and treatment and prevention of cancer. In 2013, she spoke to Jenni Murray on Woman's Hour about her experience of the disease and her views on how diet can affect recovery.
