= Sippi =

Coordinates: 28.066°N 94.169°E

Sippi is a semi-town near Daporijo in Upper Subansiri district of Arunachal Pradesh it is inhabited by mostly Tagin's of central zone, Sippi also has plain parts which is surrounded by two rivers namely Subansiri, sippi. (Sippi comes under Sigin-I of Dapriojo Circle and it is also populated with people from chetam circle).

== Topography ==
Located 14 km from district headquarter Daporijo. It is beside two rivers and acts as center for many other villages. It is situated in between Pissa hill and Batam-Belu hill in two sides and Subansiri River in other side. While the Sippi river which has long been travelling down the mountains from Nilling and Chetam circles, with different names flows directly through the heart of the land. Providing water for the paddy fields and most of people in the area. The western side has paddy fields, with mesmerising greenery to golden rice paddies in harvest seasons. Also Sippi region is famous for its oranges.

== Festivals ==
Locals celebrate Donyi-Polo day (indigenous day) with much gaiety and festivity. It is organized by village community on 1 December every year, with worship starting from Donyi-Polo Namlo. With cultural program following afterwards. The Sippi River Festival was organized for the first time in the year 2020 on 23 to 26 February.
