= Broadcasting House, Bristol =

Building in Bristol, England

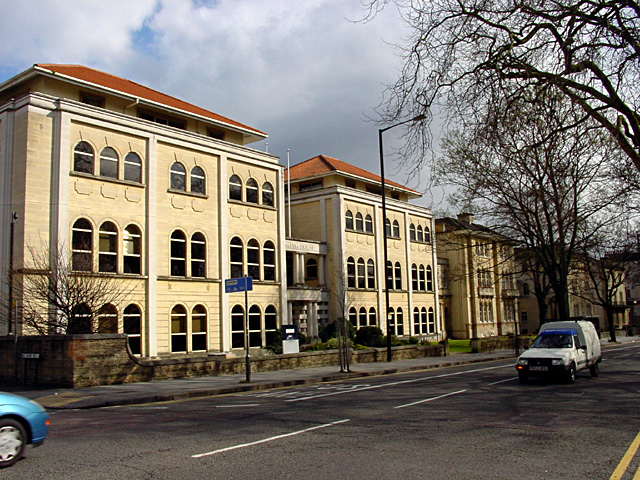

General information
- Coordinates: 51°27′40″N 2°36′29″W

The BBC campus, Broadcasting House, Bristol, is located on Whiteladies Road, Bristol. The first building to be occupied was 21/23 Whiteladies Road, which was built in 1852 and is a Grade II listed building, with four radio studios. It was formally opened by the Lord Mayor of Bristol on 18 September 1934. The BBC has been on the same site ever since.

Prior to the opening of Broadcasting House in Bristol, the BBC had provided a very limited service to the local area. It began broadcasting on 13 February 1923 operating as its 5WA station (this being the fifth BBC station to go on air). The new station broadcast from Cardiff to people living within 25 miles of Bristol. The station's initial output was limited and even in 1931 the Bristol programme centre employed a staff of just three people, operating from a small studio above the Midland Bank in Queen's Road.

== Main site ==
Since first opening, Broadcasting House has grown to incorporate 25, 27/29, 31/33, (all also Grade II listed) and 33A&B Whiteladies Road, as well as nos 1, 3, 5, 7/9, 11/13, 15/17 and 19 Tyndall's Park Road (all Grade II listed except no 3). It now provides offices and technical facilities for BBC Radio & Music Production Bristol, BBC West and BBC Radio Bristol.

Network radio studios, a network television studio (Studio A - later converted to Green Screen Virtual Studio for regional use), a regional television studio (Studio B - now demolished), and an Outside Broadcast base have all been built on the site.

The 1969 BBC policy document, Broadcasting in the Seventies, recommended a significant increase in national television production from Bristol, as well as from Birmingham and Manchester. While new centres were built in Birmingham (Pebble Mill) and Manchester (New B.H.) no suitable site could be found in Bristol. Consequently the Bristol B.H. site was developed in two phases to provide capacity for the increased production, and to modernise the local broadcasting facilities.

Phase I provided local radio studios, a combined television and radio newsroom, and a new scene dock for Studio A. Phase II was more controversial. An initial 1984 proposal of a five storey building with a glass façade was rejected by the City Planning Committee, with Councillor Brian Richards likening it to the Spectrum development, another glass building in Bristol that faced criticism for its incongruity with the surrounding area. In 1986 33A&B Whiteladies Road were demolished to make way for a new three block development providing post-production facilities, a staff restaurant, library and headquarters offices for the South and West Region, as well as a new reception for Broadcasting House. The new building was opened by Chris Patten on 19 January 1990.

After being formally established here in 1957, the BBC Studios Natural History Unit moved to a new home in Bridgewater House, Bristol city centre, in 2022. The Bristol portfolio of BBC Studios Factual Entertainment Productions was also relocated to Bridgewater House.

In May 2024 the intention to create a new base for BBC Local and BBC Audio Production on the existing Whiteladies Road site was announced. The goal is to redevelop the current OB base as a new home for the local, regional and audio teams. The rest of the Whiteladies Road site will be put up for sale.

== Other Bristol facilities ==
At the time of World War II the BBC transferred 700 people from London to Bristol. Radio facilities were provided at Redland Park Hall, All Saints Hall, the Chapter House, College Road, Clifton Parish Hall, the Cooperative Hall and the Clifton Rocks Railway.

Subsequently 15 Whiteladies Road, St Mary's Church in Belgrave Road, and Christchurch Hall have also provided accommodation and facilities. A radio control room was built in St George's Church, Brandon Hill.

From 1986, the BBC leased warehouses on the Kingsland Trading Estate, and also (from 2002) on the Lawrence Hill Industrial Park, to provide facilities for Casualty when it was produced in Bristol. However, the production moved to Cardiff in 2011.
