= The Food Programme =

- Genre: Documentary-style narration
- Running time: 45 mins (Fridays at 11.00)
- Country of origin: UK
- Home station: Radio 4
- Hosted by: Sheila Dillon, Dan Saladino, Leyla Kazim, Jaega Wise
- Edited by: Dimitri Houtart
- Original release: 30 September 1979
- Website: The Food Programme
- Podcast: Podcasts

The Food Programme is a BBC Radio 4 programme investigating and celebrating good food, founded by Derek Cooper and currently presented by Sheila Dillon, Dan Saladino, Leyla Kazim and Jaega Wise. The series is produced by BBC Audio in Bristol.

It is a programme about food production, consumption and quality rather than a cookery programme with recipes. It looks at the food industry (usually that of Britain) at the macroscopic level. Farming Today covers the upstream section of the British food industry and The Food Programme covers the downstream section.

== History ==
The programme has run since 1979 and was initially broadcast at 12:30 on a Sunday afternoon, immediately preceding The World This Weekend. It is repeated the following day (i.e. on Monday afternoon) at 3:30 p.m.

In November 2019 The Food Programme celebrated its 40th anniversary. A live show was broadcast from the BBC Radio Theatre with guests Rick Stein, Leyla Kazim, Yotam Ottolenghi and Grace Dent.

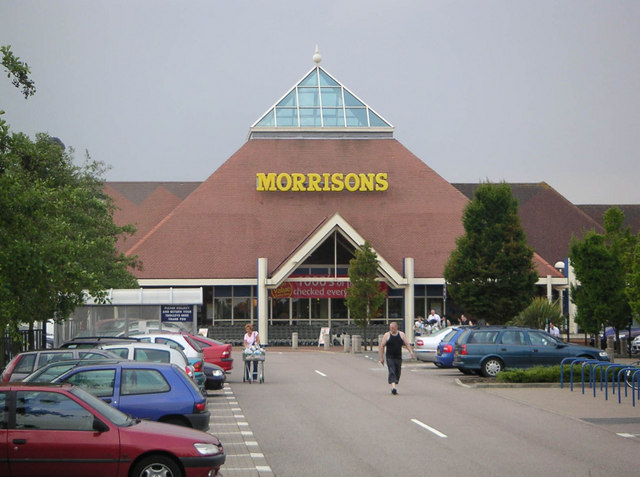
Supermarkets are where most British people buy food, and influence our eating habits

=== Guests ===
- 1987 Lady Eve Balfour founder of the Soil Association

== Structure ==
Programmes are usually devoted to discussion of a single topic, from a consumer angle, such as:

- Topical issues related to food, such as institutional cookery or dealing with food waste;
- A specific food item, such as a particular fruit or traditional dish;
- Food of a certain geographical area or of certain ethnic peoples;
- Health issues in relation to food.

Sometimes, the theme of a programme may fit into several of the above categories. For example, the programme broadcast on 14 and 15 August 2011 dealt with institutional policies to improve the diets of people in Scotland so as to make their diets more salubrious, a topic which is at once a topical issue related to food, a health issue related to food and a topic relating to the diet of people in a certain geographical group.

All the most recent programmes are now available indefinitely at the Radio 4 website to listen again.

== BBC Food and Farming Awards ==
The show hosts the annual BBC Radio Food and Farming Awards, and in so doing has been praised by Charles, Prince of Wales as a "national institution".

=== 2009 ===
- Bob Kennard won "Best Campaigner".

=== 2019 ===
- Best Streetfood/Takeaway, Liberty Kitchen

== Awards won by The Food Programme ==
The Food Programme, which celebrated its thirtieth anniversary in November 2009, has won multiple UK radio awards.

== See also ==
- You and Yours, covers the more popular (mass market) types of food stories and food scares.
