= Mutton flaps =

Cut of meat from a domestic sheep

Mutton flaps, or breast of lamb, are an inexpensive cut of meat from a sheep.

Consisting of a sheep's lower rib meat, mutton flaps are considered a low-quality cut in Western countries, as opposed to pork and beef ribs. They have been described there as a "tough, scraggy meat", if not properly prepared. Their high fat content has also contributed to their unpopularity in many Western countries, although they are widely used as gyro meat in the United States.

Mutton flaps are a staple in the South Pacific where their high fat content has been linked with the development of obesity problems. In 2000, Fiji banned their import. On 1 July 2020, Tonga banned the import of mutton flaps from New Zealand, claiming their consumption plays a major role in increasing obesity among the population.

== Method of cooking ==
In Indonesia, a similar cut of meat called breast of goat is cooked by cutting it into pieces and grilling using skewers. This dish, called sate kronyos, is especially popular in Bantul, Yogyakarta.

== See also ==
- Lamb and mutton
- Turkey tails
