= Jaega Wise =

English brewer, campaigner, broadcaster and author

- Born: 1988 (age 37–38); London, England
- Education: Loughborough University
- Occupations: Brewer; broadcaster; author
- Known for: Head brewer of Wild Card Brewery; Presenter on The Food Programme, Beer Masters and The Wine Show

Jaega Wise (/ˈdʒeɪɡə/ JAY-ga; born 1988) is an English beer brewer, campaigner, broadcaster and author. Born in London and raised in Nottingham, she is the head brewer and co-founder of London-based Wild Card Brewery and in 2018 was named "Brewer of the Year" by the British Guild of Beer Writers.

Before becoming a brewer, she studied chemical engineering and worked as a chemicals trader. Alongside brewing, Wise campaigns on various issues within the beer and wider drinks industries, including sexism, race and disability. She has also presented several radio and television shows, including BBC Radio 4's The Food Programme and Amazon Prime's Beer Masters and has appeared as a guest beer sommelier on ITV’s ‘Love Your Weekend’ with Alan Titchmarsh.

== Early life ==
Wise was born in London in 1988. She spent time in her maternal grandparents' native Trinidad and Tobago as a youngster before returning to the United Kingdom at the age of six or seven, where she was raised in Nottingham. She went on to study at Loughborough University, where she graduated with a bachelor's degree in chemical engineering in 2010. During her degree, Wise completed a placement year as a process technician with General Electric and after leaving university, she moved to London where she worked as an international chemicals trader with Whyte Chemicals.

== Wild Card Brewery ==
After working in the chemical trade for around three years, Wise left her job and began working at various bars and breweries around London. In 2012, she co-founded Wild Card Brewery with her partner, William Harris, and his friend, Andrew Birkby. The trio had often frequented beer festivals in Nottingham and were amateur homebrewers. Wise has described her background in chemical engineering as an asset in transitioning to a brewing role as she already had knowledge of some of the equipment used.

Wild Card initially operated as a "cuckoo" brewery, brewing on other breweries' equipment. They later set up a small brewing kit in the cellar of a public house, but soon outgrew this and acquired their own commercial premises for the brewery in Walthamstow, northeast London, in 2014. As the business grew, Wise became recognised for her brewing and in 2018 was named joint winner of the British Guild of Beer Writers' "Brewer of the Year" award along with John Keeling of Fuller's Brewery. She has expressed her desire to ensure that the beer she produces at the brewery remains affordable and accessible to local people despite extensive gentrification in the Walthamstow area. Wild Card Brewery ceased trading in October 2024.

== Campaigning ==
Wise has often campaigned for change within the beer industry. In November 2017, she called for groups such as the Society of Independent Brewers (SIBA) and the Campaign for Real Ale to ban beers featuring sexist language or imagery from being sold at beer festivals or entered into competitions. She has also proposed the introduction of an advertising code of practice for breweries and beer producers. Along with other British female brewers such as Sara Barton and Sophie de Ronde, Wise is an advocate for greater representation of women within the traditionally male-dominated brewing industry. She regularly takes part in the International Women's Collaboration Brew Day to commemorate International Women's Day. In 2018, Wise was elected as one of three SIBA directors for the South East region.

Wise's first book, Wild Brews, was released on 19 May 2022. The book is aimed at home brewers and explores beers produced via spontaneous fermentation from around the globe, including lambic, gose and farmhouse ale.

== Broadcasting career ==
Outside of brewing, Wise has made a number of radio and television appearances. She has been a regular presenter of BBC Radio 4's The Food Programme since 2018, and in 2020 was awarded "Best Beer Broadcaster" by the British Guild of Beer Writers for her work on the series. She has presented episodes on social issues such as race and disability within the drinks industry, and has also talked about the racist and misogynistic messages she has received on social media. Wise has also presented on Channel 5's The Wine Show along with actors Matthew Goode and Matthew Rhys, as well as wine expert Joe Fattorini.

In October 2021, it was announced that she would co-host the new Amazon Prime series Beer Masters alongside musician and publican James Blunt. The show, which ran for five episodes, featured competing teams of homebrewers recreating a range of beer styles from around the world. Outside her career with brewing shows and content, she did work with the television show "mysteries of the abandoned." Appearing in several episodes in season 9, covering engineering context, infrastructure failure, and even the social impact behind abandoned sites.
