= Max La Manna =

American chef (born 1989)

- Born: April 18, 1989 (age 37)
- Occupation: Chef
- Spouse: Venetia Falconer (m. 2019)

Max La Manna (born April 18, 1989) is an American plant-based chef and cookbook writer that advocates waste minimisation. He has been described as bridging the gap between vegan food and waste-free cooking.

== Biography ==
La Manna became interested in cooking as a teenager at his father's restaurants in Connecticut. As a young man he pursued a modelling career in New York City and Los Angeles where he also worked late nights at restaurants. At age 25, La Manna appeared on two episodes of Days of Our Lives. By 2017 he became interested in veganism and a zero-waste lifestyle.

He is a self-taught chef who promotes an affordable low-waste approach to cooking. It is reported that La Manna has cut his own food waste down to "nearly zero". La Manna's recipes have been featured in The Guardian, The Sunday Times, Vice, Vogue, and on the BBC.

In 2020, his cookbook More Plants Less Waste was named the "Most Sustainable Cookbook" at the Gourmand World Cookbook Awards. His 2023 cookbook You Can Cook This! has been described as "deliver[ing] simple vegan food with big flavour to keep things quick and easy" and was voted "World's Best Vegan Cookbook" at the Gourmand World Cookbook Awards. La Manna has commented that his favourite ingredient to cook with is broccoli. VegNews listed him as one of the "37 Creative Chefs Crafting the Future of Vegan Food" in 2023. In 2024, Food & Wine named You Can Cook This!: Easy Vegan Recipes to Save Time, Money and Waste, one of "the 20 Best Vegan Cookbooks for Every Type of Meal."

In 2023, La Manna no longer identifies as zero-waste and has stated that "zero-waste is impossible". He describes himself as low-waste, especially in the kitchen.

== Selected publications ==
- More Plants Less Waste: Plant-based Recipes + Zero Waste Life Hacks with Purpose (Yellow Kite, 2019) ISBN 978-1529396201
- You Can Cook This!: Easy Vegan Recipes to Save Time, Money and Waste (Ebury Press, 2023) ISBN 978-1529148800
