= Listed buildings in Kendal =

Kendal is a civil parish in Westmorland and Furness, Cumbria, England. It contains 187 listed buildings that are recorded in the National Heritage List for England. Of these, three are listed at Grade I, the highest of the three grades, twelve are at Grade II*, the middle grade, and the others are at Grade II, the lowest grade. The parish contains the market town of Kendal, and its surroundings. The major industries historically were wool, weaving and dyeing, and snuff is still made in the town. The Lancaster Canal came to the town in 1819, and this created new industries, including a large shoe and boot factory.

Almost all the buildings are in local limestone with roofs of slate, also obtained locally, and most of the major buildings were designed by local architects, including Francis Webster, his son George, their partner Miles Thompson, J. F. Curwen, and Stephen Shaw. Most of the listed buildings are houses with associated structures, shops, public houses, hotels, and offices, those in the centre of the town often having adjacent yards. Outside the centre of the town are farmhouses and farm buildings. Other listed buildings include churches and associated structures, a chapel, a Friends' meeting house, a well associated with an ancient spring, warehouses, a snuff works, bridges over the Lancaster Canal, which is now dry in the town, civic buildings, a pair of milestones, a bank, drinking fountains, a library, and memorials, including two war memorials.

== Key ==
Grade	Criteria
I	Buildings of exceptional interest, sometimes considered to be internationally important
II*	Particularly important buildings of more than special interest
II	Buildings of national importance and special interest

== Buildings ==
Name and location	Photograph	Date	Notes	Grade
Anchorite Well; 54.32064°N 2.74850°W	—	Medieval (possible)	A spring associated with a hermit. It is enclosed by a rectangular stone wall, about 4 feet (1.2 m) high on two sides.	II
Castle Dairy; 54.33088°N 2.74065°W	—	14th century	A medieval hall house, consisting of a central single-storey hall with two-storey cross wings. It is in stone with quoins, and a stone-flag roof. The hall has a three-light window with trefoil heads.	I
Holy Trinity Church; 54.32253°N 2.74431°W		Mid 15th century	The church was extensively restored and a porch was added in the 19th century. It is stone on chamfered plinths, with stepped buttresses, and is in Perpendicular style. The roof is slated, and has pinnacles and gargoyles. The church consists of a nave with a clerestory, double aisles, a chancel and an enclosed west tower. It is the largest church in Cumbria, and one of the widest in the country.	I
Helsington Laithes Farmhouse; 54.30950°N 2.76041°W	—	Late 15th to early 16th century	A manor house that was extended in about 1690. It is rendered on a plinth, and has a slateroof. It is mainly in two storeys with attics, and has an asymmetrical plan. The oldest part is the western block, with the central block and an east cross-wing added later. The east front is symmetrical with four bays, a central doorway and mullioned and transomed windows.	II*
Gilthwaiterigg; 54.35113°N 2.73892°W	—	Early 16th century	A stone house, partly rendered that has slate roofs with ball finials and gabled dormers. It consists of a hall with cross-wings with two storeys, and five bays. There is a central gabled porch with a squirrel finial. Some of the windows are mullioned with hood moulds, and others are 19th-century casements.	II*
69 and entry to yard of 67 Stricklandgate; 54.32935°N 2.74702°W		16th century	A house that was modernised in about 1810 and later used for other purposes. It is in stone with quoins on the right, a moulded cast iron gutter, a Welsh slate roof, and chimneys with tapering cylindrical chimneys. There are three storeys and three bays. In the ground floor is a shop front, a small window, and, on the right, a yard entrance. In the upper floors are sash windows.	II
7 Stramongate; 54.32813°N 2.74474°W	—	16th century	Originally a town house, it was restored in 1863, and later converted into a shop. It is in rendered stone with a slate roof. There are two storeys with a cellar, and three bays. In the ground floor is a door and shop windows, and the upper floor contains two three-light mullioned windows. Above is a central gabled dormer containing a similar window, and with decorative bargeboards.	II*
Collinfield Farmhouse; 54.31580°N 2.75337°W	—	Mid to late 16th century (possible)	The farmhouse was remodelled in 1668. It is in rendered stone with a slate roof and two storeys. On the roof is a gabled jettied dormer and cylindrical chimneys. The west front has a porch with a dated and initialled panel. The east front has four bays, The right two bays contain casement windows, a mullioned fire window and a mullioned cellar window. In the left two bays are a round-headed doorway, a canted bay window, and casement windows above.	II*
9 and 11 Church Walk; 54.32290°N 2.74504°W	—	1588	Originally a grammar school, later converted into houses, it is in stone with quoins, and has a slate roof, hipped to the east. There are two storeys, six bays, and a gabled wing added to No. 9, with decorative bargeboards and finials. The doorway of No. 11 has a canopy on brackets. The windows on the front are mullioned and transomed, and at the rear are some sash windows.	II
Bridge north-east of Helsington Laithes Farmhouse; 54.30979°N 2.75935°W	—	16th to 17th century	The bridge carries a farm road over a stream. It is in stone, and consists of a single semicircular arch with a span of about 5 feet (1.5 m). The roadway is about 12 feet (3.7 m) wide, and has parapets about 3 feet (0.91 m) high.	II
52 and 54 Branthwaite Brow; 54.32819°N 2.74526°W	—	17th century	Two shops on a sloping site, one above the other. They are in stone, with a moulded cast iron gutter and a slate roof. There are three storeys and four bays. In the ground floor is a recessed doorway, a fixed window, a bow window and a mullioned casement window, and steps leading up to the shop in the middle floor. In this floor is a recessed doorway, a bay window and sash windows. The top floor contains mullioned casement windows.	II
26 and 28 and entry to yard at 24 Highgate; 54.32728°N 2.74761°W		17th century	A timber framed shop, it is rendered and has a moulded cast iron gutter, and a slate roof. In the roof are two gabled dormers with tile-hung sides, decorative bargeboards and finials. There are two storeys and three bays. In the ground floor is a shop front dating from about 1838, with fluted and reeded pilasters, a cornice, three arcaded windows, and two recessed doors. In the upper floor are three canted bay windows.	II*
96 Highgate; 54.32555°N 2.74773°W	—	Mid 17th century (possible)	A rendered stone shop with a hipped slate roof. There are two storeys and one bay. In the ground floor is a shop front with panelled pilasters and a cornice, and above is a sash window.	II
147 and entry to yard at 149 Highgate; 54.32412°N 2.74708°W	—	17th century	Originally a house and a tannery, later a shop, it is rendered with a bracketed eaves cornice and a slate roof. There are three storeys and three bays. In the ground floor is a 19th-century shop front with a recessed door, reeded pilasters, and a cornice, and to the right is a yard entry. The upper floors contain sash windows.	II
151 and entry to yard at 153 Highgate; 54.32405°N 2.74704°W	—	17th century	Originally an inn, later a shop, it is in stone with a bracketed eaves cornice and a slate roof. There are three storeys and two bays. In the ground floor there is a shop front in the first bay, and an entry in the second. The shop front has panelled pilasters and a cornice, and the entry has a semicircular head and a rusticated surround. In the upper floor are sash windows in architraves, those in the middle floor also having cornices.	II
28 Kirkland and entry to yard 54.32271°N 2.74638°W	—	17th century	A house, later a shop, in rendered lath and plaster on a stone plinth, and with a slate roof. There are three storeys, each of the upper floors is jettied, and three bays. In the ground floor is a doorway between two shop windows with a cornice above, and to the right is a yard entry. In the middle floor are two paired sash windows, and the top floor has three gabled dormers containing casement windows.	II
22–28 with entry to yard at 30 Market Place; 54.32861°N 2.74590°W		17th century	A row of shop with the Working Men's Institute above, that was largely rebuilt in about 1760, refronted in 1865, and restored in 1979. It is stuccoed and has moulded eaves, a slate roof, three storeys and four bays. In the ground floor is an arcaded shop front, and stone steps lead up to a porch in the middle floor over a garage. The windows are sashes, and between the floors is an inscribed rectangular sign.	II
28 and 30 Milnthorpe Road; 54.31974°N 2.74513°W	—	17th century	Originally one house, later subdivided into two, it is in stone on a plinth, and has a moulded cast iron gutter on dentils, a slate roof, and two storeys with attics. No. 28, on the right is rendered, it has two bays, and a gabled dormer. In the ground floor is a passage to the rear on the left, and a small sash window, and there is a larger sash window in the upper floor. No. 30 has four bays, a stair wing and an outshut at the rear. Steps lead up to the doorway, and the windows are sashes, some of them blocked.	II
25 and entry to yard at 23 Stramongate; 54.32834°N 2.74422°W	—	17th century (possible)	A rendered shop that has a slate roof with a skylight and a central gabled dormer. There are two storeys, three bays and a rear extension. In the ground floor is a door between shop windows in a chamfered surround and with a cornice, and to the right is a yard entry. The upper floor contains sash windows, in the dormer is a casement window, and in the extension is a mullioned window.	II
108 and entry to 110 Stricklandgate; 54.33003°N 2.74749°W	—	17th century (possible)	Originally an inn, later a shop, the front was rebuilt in the 19th century. The shop is stuccoed with rusticated quoins at the south end, and a slate roof. There are three storeys and three bays. On the ground floor, the first two bays contain a shop front, and in the third bay is an entry to a passage. The middle floor has two double sash windows with an architrave and central colonnettes, and in the top floor are three sash windows. All the sash windows have segmental heads.	II
Oxenholme Farmhouse and Raysholme; 54.30586°N 2.72325°W	—	17th century (possible)	A farmhouse, later extended and divided into two dwellings, it is in stone, partly rendered, on a plinth, with quoins, slate roofs with projecting eaves and ball finials, and two storeys. The house consists of a central block, with north and south wings at right angles. There is a gabled porch in the north wing, and in the central block is a verandah on cast iron columns. Most of the windows are mullioned and transomed.	II
Sleddale Hall; 54.33062°N 2.74062°W	—	17th century	Originally a house, later used for other purposes, it is in stone with a slate roof. There are two storeys, and the building has an L-shaped plan, with a front range of five bays and a rear wing. In the first two bays is a shop front, and there is another doorway in the third bay. The ground floor windows are multi-paned, and in upper floor they are sashes. In the rear wing external stairs lead to a first floor gallery.	II
Wattsfield Farmhouse and Cottage; 54.31492°N 2.74416°W	—	17th century	The cottage was added to the former farmhouse in the 18th century. They are rendered, on a plinth, and have slate roofs. The house has two storeys and three bays. In the centre is a two-storey porch and has a doorway with and architrave and a segmental pediment. The windows are casements. The cottage has two storeys with cellars, and two bays. Above the door is a rectangular fanlight, the windows are sashes, and at the rear is a stair window.	II*
Property to south of Fleece Inn; 54.32743°N 2.74759°W		1654	Originally a house, later a restaurant, it is stuccoed, and has a slate roof containing a gabled segment-headed dormer. There are two storeys, a single bay, a 20th-century shop front in the ground floor, and a sash window in an architrave above.	II
New Inn; 54.32546°N 2.74774°W		1654	The public house is rendered on a plinth, with an eaves cornice and a slate roof. There are two storeys, four bays, and a rear wing. In the centre is a plank door, and the windows are casements with mullions and transoms.	II
Flats A–F Grandy Nook; 54.32904°N 2.75116°W	—	1659	Originally a house, or two houses, forming two blocks, the northern block slightly recessed. They are in stone on a plinth, and have slate roofs. The southern block has two storeys and attics, and five bays. It contains two central doors with a wooden oriel window above them, two gabled dormers, and mullioned and transomed windows. The northern block has two storeys, a symmetrical front of two bays, a central doorway with a canopy on consoles, two porches at the rear, and mullioned and transomed windows.	II
Sandes Hospital Cottages; 54.32594°N 2.74822°W		1659	A row of almshouses that were rebuilt, or refronted, in 1852. They are in stone with quoins, and have a slate roof with stone copings. They have a single storey and form a symmetrical row with a central block, originally a library, and four cottages on each side, giving a front of 15 bays. The cottage are arranged in pairs, and have gabled porches and mullioned windows.	II
80 and 80A Highgate; 54.32577°N 2.74775°W		1663	This was originally the gatehouse to Sandes Hospital, and has since been used for other purposes. It is in rendered stone with a slate roof. There are two storeys, and a symmetrical front of five bays, the middle three bays projecting forward and having an eaves cornice. In the centre is a passage with a semicircular arch, above which is a panel containing a coat of arms. The windows are mullioned, and inside the passage is a niche containing an alms box, above which are inscriptions.	II
41 and entry to yard at 43 Highgate; 54.32655°N 2.74735°W	—	Mid to late 17th century (probable)	A shop that was refronted in 1826, it is in stone with a band, a slate roof, three storeys and two bays. There is a shop front in the first bay and an entry in the second. The shop front has paired, panelled pilasters and a cornice, with a curved door on the right and an arcaded window on the left. In the upper floors are sash windows.	II
Birk Hag Farmhouse; 54.31870°N 2.72211°W	—	1666	The farmhouse was later extended. It is in rendered stone, and has slate roofs with gabled dormers and cylindrical chimneys. The farmhouse has two storeys with an attic, and an L-shaped plan. There is a porch, plank doors and casement windows. Inside is an inglenook and a chamfered bressumer.	II
2 Police Yard; 54.32815°N 2.74583°W	—	Late 17th century (probable)	Originally a town house, later altered and used for other purposes, including being the first police station in the town. It is in stone with a slate roof, and incorporates a stair turret. There are three storeys and a basement. It contains doorways and windows of varying types, and many of the original internal features have been retained.	II*
13–19 Stricklandgate; 54.32808°N 2.74711°W	—	1688	Originally houses, later a row of shops, refronted in about 1822. They are partly timber-framed, and have stucco applied to a lath and plaster front, a dentilled eaves cornice, and a slate roof. There are three storeys, and a total of seven bays; the top floor is jettied with a moulded bressumer. In the ground floor are shop fronts with features including bow windows and cast iron barley-sugar-twist columns, and the windows in the upper floors are sashes in architraves.	II*
Former Woolpack Inn and entry to yard of 56 Stricklandgate; 54.32865°N 2.74729°W		Before about 1695	Originally an inn, later used for other purposes, it is rendered on a stuccoed plinth, and has a moulded cast iron gutter and a slate roof. The main block has three storeys and two bays, and contains sash windows. To the left is a carriage entrance, above which is a canted oriel window. The entrance is in the passage.	II
50 and entry to yard at 52 Branthwaite Brow; 54.32825°N 2.74530°W	—	Late 17th to early 18th century	A stone shop, the ground floor rendered, with a moulded cast iron gutter and a slate roof. There are two storeys and two bays. In the ground floor is a shop front, with steps on the right leading up to the yard. In the upper floor are sash windows.	II
32, entry to yard of 32A, and 32B Kirkland; 54.32254°N 2.74626°W	—	Late 17th to early 18th century	A house, later divided into two, in rendered stone with quoins, an eaves cornice, and slate roofs. There are two storeys and a front of four bays. Above the doorway is a shell canopy on brackets, and to the left is a doorway leading to the yard. The windows are mullioned, and at the rear are two French windows.	II
Fleece Inn and yard entrance 54.32747°N 2.74753°W		Late 17th to early 18th century	The public house is timber framed and roughcast, with a dentilled eaves cornice, and a slate roof. There are two storeys, each upper floor being jettied, and two bays. A passage runs through to the left, and in it are a doorway, a mullioned and transomed casement window, and an 18th-century sash window. On the front are five wooden Tuscan columns carrying a bressumer and casement windows, most dating from the 20th century.	II
90 Stricklandgate; 54.32940°N 2.74741°W	—	1710	A house that was largely rebuilt following an explosion in 1788, it is in rendered stone with a moulded cast iron gutter on dentils, and a slate roof. There are three storeys and four bays. In the ground floor is a shop front with reeded columns attached to pilasters, and a cornice. To the left is a window, and in the upper floor are sash windows.	II
Unitarian Chapel and schoolroom 54.32861°N 2.74520°W		1720	The schoolroom and the porch were added in 1822. The chapel is stuccoed on a chamfered plinth, it has a gutters on dentils, and a slate roof. The building is symmetrical with two storeys and five bays. The porch is gabled and has buttresses and a hipped roof, and the doorway has a segmental head and a decorative hood mould. The windows are mullioned and most also have transoms. The schoolroom is in stone with a slate roof, and has a single storey and three bays.	II
4 and 6 Dr Manning's Yard; 54.32564°N 2.74709°W	—	Early 18th century (probable)	A pair of rendered cottages with a slate roof, two storeys and four bays. The windows are sashes, and in the roof of No. 4 is a dormer.	II
8, 10 and 12 Dr Manning's Yard; 54.32567°N 2.74696°W		Early 18th century (probable)	A row of three rendered cottages with a slate roof, two storeys and a total of seven bays. They have plank doors and sash window, and there are three dormers.	II
14 and 16 Dr Manning's Yard and passage 54.32565°N 2.74677°W	—	Early 18th century (probable)	A pair of rendered cottages with a slate roof, two storeys and three bays. In the ground floor is an elliptical-headed wagon arch containing a doorway, a plank door and a sash window, and in the upper floor is a sash window and a casement window.	II
7 Finkle Street; 54.32769°N 2.74684°W	—	Early 18th century (probable)	A stuccoed shop that has a slate roof with two small skylights. There are three storeys and four bays. The shop front dates from about 1830, it has reeded pilasters and an egg and dart cornice, and there is a door to the left leading to a passage. The windows in the upper floor are sashes, and elsewhere are mullioned and transomed windows.	II
27 and 29 and entry to yard of 31 Market Place; 54.32834°N 2.74609°W	—	Early 18th century	The shops were refronted in the 19th century. They are rendered and have a moulded cast iron gutter and a slate roof. There are three storeys and three bays. In the ground floor are shop fronts with panelled pilasters and a cornice, and the entry to the yard is at the left. Above, there is one casement window, the other windows are three-light sashes.	II
The Brewery and passage to south 54.32470°N 2.74755°W		Early 18th century	This was built as a town house and later used for other purposes. It is rendered on a plinth, with an eaves cornice on dentils, and a slate roof. There are three storeys and three bays. Steps lead up to a central doorway with a pediment and a traceries fanlight. To the left is a segment-headed coach entrance, and the windows are sashes.	II
95 Stricklandgate; 54.33007°N 2.74712°W	—	1728	A house, later used for other purposes, in rendered stone with an eaves cornice, a moulded cast iron gutter on dentils, and a slate roof. There are three storeys and five bays. Above the door is a rectangular fanlight, and the windows are sashes.	II
Romney House; 54.31984°N 2.74512°W		Early to mid 18th century	A house, once the home of the painter George Romney, it is rendered, on a plinth, and has rusticated corner pilasters, a dentilled eaves cornice, and a slate roof. There are three storeys and three bays. The doorway has tapered pilasters, a cornice, and a rectangular fanlight, and the windows are sashes. On the front is a circular inscribed cast iron plaque.	II
Ring 0' Bells Public House; 54.32237°N 2.74525°W		1741	The public house is in stone, partly rendered, and has a slate roof. There are seven bays, the two western bays have three storeys and the others have two. On the south front are two doorways with canopies. Most of the windows are sashes, some with segmental heads.	II
46 and 48 Appleby Road; 54.33423°N 2.73674°W	—	18th century	A stone house and cottage with a slate roof and two storeys. The cottage on the right has one bay and a two-storey canted bay window. The house has five bays, a central doorway with an architrave and a cornice, and sashes.	II
33 and 33A Beast Banks; 54.32547°N 2.75053°W	—	Mid 18th century	Originally a shop and a cottage, later two houses, they are in stone with quoins, slate roofs, and two storeys. No. 33 has a moulded cast iron gutter, and a symmetrical front of three bays. In the centre is a doorway with a wooden architrave flanked by bow windows, all in a surround with panelled pilasters and a cornice; above are sash windows. No. 33A has two bays, a doorway with a segmental head, and sash windows.	II
44 Branthwaite Brow; 54.32831°N 2.74531°W	—	18th century (possible)	A shop, the front remodelled in the 19th century, it is in stone with quoins, a string course, a moulded cast iron gutter on brackets, and a slate roof. There are three storeys and two bays. In the ground floor is a wooden shop front with panelled pilasters and a cornice, and to the right is an entry. There are two sash windows in each of the upper floors.	II
Warehouse, Collin Croft; 54.32626°N 2.74883°W	—	18th century (probable)	The warehouse is in stone with quoins and a slate roof. There are three storeys and a single bay. It contains doors and windows, mainly blocked, and a hoist at the gable end, with a door and a window.	II
2 Dr Manning's Yard; 54.32563°N 2.74721°W	—	18th century	A rendered cottage with a slate roof, two storeys and three bays. It has a plank door and sash window.	II
60 and entry to yard at 62 Highgate; 54.32645°N 2.74770°W	—	18th century (probable)	A shop, refronted in the early 19th century, in ashlar stone, with a band, an eaves cornice on dentils, and a slate roof with two gabled dormers. There are three storeys and two bays. In the ground floor is a shop front with paired, fluted and panelled pilasters, and a cornice. It contains a recessed doorway with a fanlight between plate glass windows, and a yard entry to the left.	II
71–75 Highgate; 54.32579°N 2.74737°W	—	18th century	A house, later a shop, stuccoed, with rusticated quoins and a slate roof. There are three storeys with attics and four bays. In the ground floor is a shop front, the upper floors contain sash windows, and in the roof are two dormers containing horizontally-sliding sashes.	II
130 and 132 Highgate; 54.32409°N 2.74747°W	—	Mid 18th century	A house and a shop in pebbledashed stone, with an eaves cornice on dentils, and a slate roof. There are three storeys and six bays. No. 130, the house, has steps with wrought iron handrails leading up to a doorway, and in front are area railings. In the ground floor of the shop, to the left, is a symmetrical shop front with reeded pilasters, a central doorway and flanking curved bay windows. Under the right window is a plinth, and under the left window are cellar doors. The windows in the upper floor of both parts are sashes.	II
138 Highgate; 54.32383°N 2.74735°W	—	18th century	A shop in stuccoed stone with an eaves cornice, a slate roof, three storeys and two bays. In the ground floor is a shop front with pilasters and a cornice, and to the left is a doorway with a pilastered surround leading to the rear. In the upper floors are sash windows.	II
74 Kirkland; 54.32186°N 2.74532°W	—	18th century	A pebbledashed house on a plinth, with a slate roof. It has three storeys and two bays. There is one fixed window, and the other windows are sashes.	II
34 Market Place; 54.32853°N 2.74574°W	—	18th century	Once a public house, the building is stuccoed, and has a moulded cast iron gutter on brackets, and a slate roof. There are three storeys and a symmetrical three-bay front. The ground floor projects, and above are sash windows.	II
29 and entry to yard at 27 Stramongate; 54.32838°N 2.74413°W	—	18th century	A rendered shop with a moulded cast iron gutter and a slate roof. There are three storeys and two bays. In the ground floor is a shop front with panelled pilasters, a cornice and an arcaded shop window, and to the right is a yard entry. In the upper floors are sash windows.	II
36 Stramongate; 54.32865°N 2.74419°W	—	18th century	A house, later a shop, on a corner site, it is in rendered stone with rusticated quoins, a moulded cast iron gutter on modillions, and a slate roof. There are three storeys and three bays. In the ground floor are shop fronts, above are sash windows.	II
42 and 46 and entry to yard at 44 Stramongate; 54.32882°N 2.74388°W	—	18th century	A former public house and a shop, rendered on a chamfered plinth, with a moulded cast iron gutter on dentils, and a slate roof. There are three storeys, and each building has two bays. No. 46 has a shop front and a yard entry to the left, and the windows are sashes.	II
George and Dragon public house 54.32835°N 2.74543°W		18th century (probable)	The public house is stuccoed, on a rusticated plinth, and has a string course, moulded eaves, a moulded cast iron gutter, and a slate roof with two gabled dormers. There are two storeys and three bays. In the ground floor is a doorway with a fanlight flanked by sash windows, and at the right is a semicircular carriage arch with a rusticated surround, moulded imposts, and a projecting keystone. In the upper floor are sash windows in moulded frames, and between the floors is a moulded frame.	II
Globe Inn; 54.32853°N 2.74649°W		18th century	The public house was rebuilt in the 20th century following fire damage as a reproduction of the original. It is stuccoed with rusticated quoins and a slate roof. There are three bays and three storeys, the first floor being jettied. On the front is a door in an architrave, and all the windows are 20th-century casements in architraves.	II
Bridge to Helsington Laithes Farmhouse; 54.30985°N 2.75960°W	—	18th century (probable)	The bridge over a stream is in stone and consists of a single elliptical arch with a span of about 5 feet (1.5 m). The roadway is about 10 feet (3.0 m) wide, and the parapets are about 3 feet (0.91 m) high.	II
Threshing barn and gin-gang, Spital farm 54.34231°N 2.72933°W	—	18th century (possible)	The building is in stone with quoins, and has a slate roof, hipped at the west. It has an elliptical-headed wagon door and doorway, windows, and a winnowing door. At the rear is a later gin-gang with a circular plan containing a door and four windows.	II
Gate piers and forecourt wall, Wattsfield Farmhouse; 54.31494°N 2.74440°W	—	18th century (probable)	The gate piers are in ashlar stone, with a square plan, and are about 10 feet (3.0 m) high. Each has a plinth, a corniced top, and a ball finial, and between them is a wrought iron gate. The piers are flanked by drystone walls about 5 feet (1.5 m) high with flat copings.	II
Abbot Hall Art Gallery; 54.32296°N 2.74391°W		1759	Originally a town house, it was converted into an art gallery in 1957–62. The building is in stone on a plinth, with quoins, a belt course, a modillioned eaves cornice, and a parapet. The central block has two storeys with cellars, and there is a symmetrical east front of seven bays. Curved steps lead up to a central round-headed doorway in an architrave with moulded imposts, a projecting keystone, and an interlaced fanlight. This is flanked by two-storey canted bay windows, and outside these are recessed bays in one storey containing Venetian windows. The outermost two bays on each side are gabled, lower and further recessed, and have one storey. They contain two round-headed sash windows with an oval window in a pediment above.	I
Museum of Lakeland Life and Industry; 54.32299°N 2.74479°W		c. 1759	This originated as the stables and carriage entrance to Abbot Hall, and was later converted into a museum. It is in limestone, on a plinth, with quoins and a hipped slate roof. There are two storeys and a symmetrical front of seven bays. The central and end bays project forward, and have impost bands and pyramidal roofs, and the central bay also has a dentilled cornice. In the centre is a semicircular-headed carriage arch with an oval window above.	II
163 and 163A Highgate; 54.32382°N 2.74704°W	—	Mid to late 18th century	A shop and living accommodation in rendered stone on a plinth, with a gutter on dentils and a hipped slate roof. It has three storeys and three bays, the central bay forming a rounded corner. In the ground floor is an ornate shop front, the door in the middle on the corner having a fanlight, there is a fixed window to the left, and a long sash window to the right. The surround has panelled pilasters, egg and dart moulding, a frieze with wreaths, and a cornice. In the upper floors are sash windows.	II
Highgate Hotel; 54.32418°N 2.74747°W		1769	A large house, later a hotel, it is rendered with some slate-hanging, on a plinth, and has an eaves cornice, a boxed gutter on dentils, and a slate roof. There are three storeys and five bays. Steps lead up to the main doorway, and to the left is a doorway with a chamfered surround leading to the rear. The windows are sashes, the window between the doorways having an inscribed lintel, and with a dated panel above.	II*
100 Highgate; 54.32535°N 2.74771°W	—	c. 1770	Originally a house, later used for other purposes, it is stuccoed, on a plinth, and has a band, rusticated corner pilasters, an eaves cornice, and a slate roof. There are three storeys with cellars, and three bays. In the ground floor, the left bay has a carriage entrance, and in the other bays are windows, all of which have elliptical arches, imposts and keystones. In the upper floors are sash windows, and at the rear is a stair window.	II
99 and entry to yard of 97 Highgate; 54.32516°N 2.74732°W	—	Late 18th century	Originally a town house, later used for other purposes, it is in ashlar stone, with end pilasters on the ground floor, a band, an eaves cornice, and a slate roof. There are three storeys and three bays. In the ground floor are a doorway with a cornice on brackets, two tall 20th-century windows to the right, and an elliptical-headed yard entrance to the left. In the upper floors are sash windows.	II
18 and 20 Market Place; 54.32861°N 2.74590°W	—	Late 18th century	Originally a public house, later two shops, the building is in stone with quoins, a moulded cast iron gutter, and a slate roof. There are three storeys and two bays. No. 18 has a 19th-century shop front with fluted pilasters, and a cornice, No. 20 has a 20th-century shop front, and above are sash windows.	II
31 and 37 Stramongate; 54.32846°N 2.74399°W	—	Late 18th century	Houses, later a shop and offices, the building is rendered, and has a plinth with rusticated quoins, a dentilled cornice, and a slate roof. There are three storeys with cellars, and five bays. On the front are a doorway to an office and an entry to a passage, both with semicircular heads, projecting imposts and keystones, and to the left is a shop front. The windows are sashes.	II
48, 50, 50A and 52 Stramongate and yard entry 54.32900°N 2.74364°W	—	Late 18th century	A row of four houses, three of which have been converted into shops. They are in limestone and have a band, moulded gutters, some with dentils, and a slate roof. There are three storeys and a total of 13 bays. Between Nos. 49 and 50, and between Nos. 50A and 52 are semicircular-headed carriage arches with rusticated surrounds. In the passages are doorways, one with a Doric doorcase. The shops have projecting shop fronts, and the house, No. 52 has three semicircular-headed sash windows in the ground floor, and a forecourt with railings in front. In the upper floors are sash windows, those above the carriage arches with segmental heads.	II
Queen's Club; 54.32329°N 2.74707°W	—	Late 18th century	Originally a house, later used as a convent, and then as a club, it is in rendered stone on a plinth, and has rusticated quoins, an eaves cornice, a wooden gutter on dentils, and slate roofs, partly rendered. There are three storeys, and the building has a T-shaped plan, consisting of a five-bay west wing, a two-bay east wing, and a two-bay north wing. The windows are sashes.	II
Cottage adjoining Queen's Club; 54.32320°N 2.74741°W	—	Late 18th century	A stone house on a plinth, with quoins and a slate roof, hipped at the right. There are two storeys and five bays. The door is in the left bay and has a wooden surround with pilasters and a rectangular fanlight, and the windows are sashes.	II
Stricklandgate House; 54.32955°N 2.74747°W		c. 1776	A house, later used for other purposes, it is stuccoed and on a plinth, and has rusticated quoins, bands, and a slate roof. There are three storeys and a seven bays. There is a central doorway with a pediment, and in the first bay is a semicircular-headed carriage entrance. The windows in the lower two floors are sashes, and in the top floor they are casements. The central window in each floor has a decorative architrave.	II
40 Market Place and entrance to Unitarian Chapel; 54.32842°N 2.74554°W	—	c. 1777	Originally a manse for the Unitarian Chapel, later a shop, it is in stone with a moulded wooden eaves cornice, and a slate roof. There are three storeys and four bays. In the ground floor is a shop front with fluted pilasters and a cornice. At the right is a semicircular arch leading to a passage, along which is a moulded rubbing strip. On the north front steps lead up to a doorway, and at the rear is a projecting staircase and a stair window.	II
Warehouse, Old Shambles; 54.32747°N 2.74980°W	—	1779	Originally a public house, later a warehouse, it is in stone on a plinth, with a hipped slate roof. There are three storeys and a symmetrical front of five bays. The central three bays are flanked by pilasters and have a pediment containing a blocked oculus. The central doorway has a semicircular head, imposts and a projecting keystone, and the windows are sashes.	II
Bank Cottage and Bank House; 54.32590°N 2.74969°W	—	c. 1780	Two stone houses, both pebbledashed on plinths, with quoins, moulded cast iron gutters on dentils, slate roofs, and two storeys. Bank House has four bays, a decorated porch, and sash windows. In the north return is a two-storey canted bay window and a tall stair window. Bank Cottage projects forward, it has three bays, two doorways and sash windows.	II
9 Lowther Street; 54.32677°N 2.74679°W	—	c. 1782	A stone shop with an eaves cornice and a slate roof, three storeys with a cellar, and two bays. In the ground floor is a shop front with arcaded windows and a door to the right. To the right of this is a doorway with panelled pilasters, and above the window and doorway is a cornice. The upper floors contain sash windows.	II
19 Lowther Street; 54.32684°N 2.74631°W	—	c. 1782	Originally a warehouse, later a shop, it is in rendered stone, and has a slate roof with a central gabled dormer. There are three storeys with an attic, and a symmetrical front of three bays. In the ground floor is a shop front with a cornice and a door with a fanlight. Above, the central bay is recessed, and at the top is a loading door. The windows in the upper floors are sashes.	II
20 Lowther Street; 54.32705°N 2.74577°W	—	c. 1782	A stone house on a limestone plinth, with a modillioned cornice. There are three storeys with cellars, and three bays. The doorway has a wooden surround, a rectangular fanlight, and a cornice, and the windows are sashes.	II
24 and 26 Lowther Street; 54.32709°N 2.74555°W	—	c. 1782	A pair of houses in a terrace, in stone on a limestone plinth. They have three storeys and cellars, and a symmetrical front of three bays. Steps lead up to two central recessed doors in a doorway with a semicircular-headed stuccoed arch. The windows are sashes, and the cellar windows have segmental heads.	II
28 Lowther Street; 54.32710°N 2.74544°W	—	c. 1782	A stone house on a limestone plinth, with a modillioned cornice. There are three storeys with cellars, and three bays. The doorway has a 20th-century doorcase, the windows are sashes, and there are grilles in front of the segment-headed cellar windows.	II
29 Lowther Street; 54.32695°N 2.74553°W		c. 1782	The house is in limestone with rusticated quoins, a modillioned eaves cornice, and a slate roof. There are three storeys with cellars, and three bays. In the centre is a semicircular arch with a rusticated surround, imposts and a projecting keystone. Through the arch steps lead up to a recessed doorway with reeded pilasters and a semicircular fanlight. The windows are sashes, with one cellar window blocked.	II
30 Lowther Street; 54.32711°N 2.74530°W	—	1782	A house in a terrace, in stone on a limestone plinth, with quoins, an eaves cornice, and a slate roof. There are three storeys and cellars, and a symmetrical front of five bays. The doorway is recessed, with a semicircular head and a fanlight. The windows are sashes, and there are grilles over the cellar windows.	II
Snuff works 54.32690°N 2.74584°W	—	c. 1782	The snuff works and offices occupy Nos. 25 and 27 Lowther Street. They are in limestone on a plinth, with a band, slate roofs, and two storeys. No. 27 has three bays, in the ground floor are a doorway with a rectangular fanlight, a shop window and a sash window. In the upper floor are a sash window and a casement window, with a trade sign in the form of a Turk between and an inscribed plaque. No. 25 is higher, with a cornice and four bays. In the ground floor are two round-headed doorways with fanlights, one also with imposts and a keystone. Between them are two round-headed fixed windows and above are four sash windows.	II
Mint House and barn 54.34228°N 2.73713°W	—	1783	The barn has been incorporated into the house resulting in a symmetrical plan. The house is in stuccoed stone with quoins and a slate roof. The central block has three storeys, three bays, and a modillioned wooden cornice. In the centre is a recessed doorway with a semicircular fanlight, and a wrought iron balcony with a balustrade on the porch. The flanking wings have two storeys and two bays, an all the windows are sashes.	II
34 Lowther Street; 54.32715°N 2.74511°W	—	c. 1788	The house is in limestone with bands, an eaves cornice, and hipped slate roof. There are three storeys with cellars, and three bays. In the left bay steps lead up to a round-headed doorway with a Gibbs surround, and a recessed door with a fanlight. The windows on the front are sashes, and the cellar windows are blocked. In the right return is a full-height bay window with a semicircular plan containing curved sashes.	II
156–164 Stricklandgate; 54.33130°N 2.74821°W	—	1788	Originally a factory that later incorporated a bank, and was subsequently divided into dwellings. It is in stone with quoins and moulded cast iron gutters. Most of the roof is in 20th-century concrete tiles, with a wing in Welsh slate. The building is in two and three storeys, and has eight bays. There is a doorway with a cornice on consoles, and a panel with a coat of arms above. The windows are sashes in stone surrounds.	II
69, 69A and 69B Highgate; 54.32588°N 2.74734°W	—	1792	Originally a bank, later used for other purposes, it is stuccoed with a band, rusticated quoins, an eaves cornice and a slate roof. There are three storeys and three bays. In the ground floor is a shop front that has windows with a traceried frieze, to the left is a passage entry, and in the upper floors are sash windows.	II
53 Stramongate; 54.32877°N 2.74349°W	—	1792	A house, later used for other purposes, it is in stone with quoins on the right, an eaves cornice, and a slate roof. There are three storeys with cellars, and four bays. Steps lead up to a recessed doorway with a cornice on brackets, and the windows are sashes. There is a full-height stair window in the left return.	II
134 and 136 Highgate; 54.32392°N 2.74740°W		c. 1798	A pair of houses by Francis Webster, later used as offices, in ashlar stone on a plinth, with a band, an eaves cornice on dentile, and a slate roof. There are three storeys, and each house has three bays. Both houses have a doorway in the left bay, approached by steps flanked by wrought iron railings with square standards and a cast iron urn finial at the top. All the windows are sashes.	II
109 Burneside Road; 54.33888°N 2.74838°W	—	Late 18th to early 19th century	A rendered house with a band, a moulded cast iron gutter on dentils, and a hipped slate roof. There are two storeys and three bays on both the south and west fronts. On the south front is a gabled porch. The windows are sashes, some of them in the south front have pilasters and a cornice, and on the west front they are in architraves, some with cornices.	II
32–36 Finkle Street; 54.32802°N 2.74567°W	—	Late 18th to early 19th century	A pair of stone shops with slate roofs, and a yard entry between, with three storeys. No. 32 has two bays, with a shop front and the yard entrance in the ground floor. No. 36 has a symmetrical three bay front with a doorway flanked by bow windows. Both shops have sash windows in the upper floors.	II
8, 10 and 10A Highgate; 54.32756°N 2.74752°W	—	Late 18th to early 19th century	A pair of stone shops with a slate roof, four storeys and four bays. In the ground floor are two 20th-century shop fronts, and the entry to the Old Shambles on the left. In the upper floors are sash windows.	II
17 at east end of 19 Highgate; 54.32714°N 2.74705°W	—	Late 18th to early 19th century	Originally a house, then a shop, in stone with quoins and a slate roof. There are three storeys and two bays. Above the door is another door leading to a walkway over a porch. The windows are sashes and there is a stair window.	II
21 and 25 and entry to yard at 23 Highgate; 54.32705°N 2.74729°W	—	Late 18th to early 19th century	A pair of shops, formerly a shop and the Angel Hotel, in rendered stone with a cornice, a moulded cast iron gutter on dentils. The roof is in slate and at the centre of the ridge is a lantern. There are three storeys and five bays. In the first two bays in the ground floor is a shop front, to the right is a doorway and two sash windows, and in the upper floors are more sash windows. The central bay contains an entry with an elliptical head, imposts and a projecting keystone.	II
17, 19 and 21 Market Place and entrance to New Shambles; 54.32833°N 2.74631°W	—	Late 18th to early 19th century	Shops, formerly with a meeting room above, they are stuccoed with a slate roof, and have two storeys and five bays. In the ground floor are shop fronts with pilasters and a cornice, and the entrance to New Shambles is on the left. In the upper floor is a three-light sash window flanked by two sash windows.	II
54 and entry to yard at 56 Stramongate; 54.32913°N 2.74330°W	—	Late 18th to early 19th century	A house, later a shop, in ashlar stone with a moulded cast iron gutter and a slate roof. There are three storeys and three bays. In the ground floor is a shop front on a plinth, with a panelled pilasters and a cornice. To the right is a semicircular-headed carriage arch, and the windows in the upper floors are mullioned and transomed.	II
56 Stramongate; 54.32917°N 2.74319°W	—	Late 18th to early 19th century	A stuccoed house with rusticated end pilasters, a band, a moulded cast iron gutter and a slate roof. There are three storeys and two bays. On the right is a doorway with a semicircular fanlight, and the windows are sashes.	II
2–10 New Shambles; 54.32819°N 2.74619°W		1803	A shopping arcade, originally five shops, some of which have been combined. They are in stone, with two storeys, and have wooden shop fronts and a slate canopy running the length of the shops. In the upper floor are one blocked window, two fixed windows, and two trompe-l'œil windows.	II
3–23 New Shambles; 54.32816°N 2.74630°W	—	1803	A shopping arcade, originally twelve shops, some of which have been combined. They have wooden shop fronts with paired pilasters, and most have panelled doors. The roof is in slate with the eaves extended to provide canopies.	II
117 and entry to yard at 119 Highgate; 54.32479°N 2.74724°W	—	1811	A stone house on a plinth, with an eaves cornice, a slate roof, three storeys and four bays. In the ground floor, on the left is a recessed round-headed doorway with a semicircular fanlight, and a semicircular passage entrance on the right. The windows are sash windows.	II
Garden House; 54.33587°N 2.73135°W	—	c. 1812	A house built for John Gough and later used for other purposes, it is in rendered stone and has an eaves cornice, and a slate roof with three skylights. There are two storeys, a symmetrical front of three bays, and a verandah carried on an iron arcade. The central doorway has panelled pilasters, a cornice, and a semicircular fanlight, and the windows are sashes.	II
Friends' Meeting House; 54.32849°N 2.74307°W		1816	The Friends' Meeting House, designed by Francis Webster, was extended in 1936. It is in limestone on a plinth, with an eaves cornice and a blocking course. The slate roofs have parallel ridges. There are two storeys and five bays. On two fronts are porches, each with a cornice and a lunette above. The ground floor windows have round heads, and those in the upper floor have flat heads.	II*
Change Bridge; 54.31902°N 2.73914°W		c. 1816–18	The change bridge carries a road over the Lancaster Canal, which is dry at this point. It is in limestone, and consists of a single elliptical arch. The bridge has voussoirs, bands, projecting keystones, coped parapets, and pilasters at the ends.	II
2 Market Place; 54.32854°N 2.74678°W	—	c. 1818	A stuccoed shop with a moulded cast iron gutter and a slate roof. There are four storeys and two bays. In the ground floor is a 20th-century shop front, and above are sash windows.	II
4 Market Place; 54.32854°N 2.74670°W	—	c. 1818	A stuccoed shop with panelled pilasters, a moulded cast iron gutter and a slate roof. There are four storeys and a single bay. In the ground floor is a 19th-century shop front with a recessed doorway and curved windows, flanked by pilasters and with a dentilled cornice. Each of the upper floors contains a sash window in an architrave, in the first floor it has a bracketed pediment, in the second floor is a segmental pediment, and the window in the top floor has an apron.	II
Central Primary School; 54.32635°N 2.75007°W		1818	A former school in stone on a plinth, with quoins and a slate roof with projecting eaves. There is a single tall storey and twelve bays. The entrance is in a gabled porch in the south gable end, and has an elliptical-headed doorway with an impost band. This is flanked by round-headed windows, and there is an inscribed slate tablet above the porch. Most of the windows on the sides have elliptical heads.	II
Natland Mill Beck Bridge; 54.31122°N 2.74030°W		1818	The bridge carries Natland Mill Beck Lane over the Lancaster Canal, now dry in this area. It is in stone, and consists of a single elliptical arch with a span of about 20 feet (6.1 m). The bridge is on a plinth, and has a band, projecting keystones, parapets with flat copings, and a roadway about 12 feet (3.7 m) wide. On the plinth is a benchmark.	II
Bridge House, 1 Bridge Street and 1 Aynam Road; 54.32680°N 2.74397°W	—	1819	Originally a showroom and offices designed by Francis Webster for his marble works, and later converted into three houses. They are in stone with quoins, a moulded cast iron gutter, and slate roofs. There are two storeys, and each house has three bays. Bridge House has end pilasters and a doorway with a cornice, and No. 1 Aynam Road is on a plinth. Each house has a mix of sash and casement windows, and two have wrought iron balconies.	II
Mint Cottage; 54.34313°N 2.73866°W	—	1821	A rendered stone house with slate roofs and two storeys. The main block has a symmetrical front of three bays, there is a single-storey extension to the left, and a two-storey wing to the right. In the main block is a doorway with a semi-circular head, flanked by sash windows in recesses, and sash windows in the upper floor. In the wing is a French door and a casement window.	II
27 Stricklandgate; 54.32854°N 2.74695°W	—	1822	A stuccoed shop on a corner site, with a cornice over the ground floor on ornamental consoles, an eaves cornice, a moulded cast iron gutter on brackets, and a hipped slate roof. There are three storeys and six bays. In the corner is a doorway in an architrave with a rectangular fanlight. To the left is an arcaded shop window, and to the right are small shop windows. In the upper floors are sash windows.	II
Gate piers, gates, and railings, Kendal Parish Church; 54.32248°N 2.74555°W		1822	The gate piers are in stone with a square plan, and have moulded bases, rusticated columns, and corniced caps surmounted by urns. The gates and railings are in wrought iron. The gates are ornamented with scrollwork, and the railings are about 4 feet (1.2 m) high, with spearhead standards and fleur-de-lis finials.	II
3 Thorney Hills; 54.32808°N 2.73941°W	—	c. 1823	A stone house on a plinth, with bands, a dentilled eaves cornice, a moulded cast iron gutter, and a slate roof. There are two storeys with a cellar, and two bays. In the ground floor, the right bay contains a semicircular-headed carriage arch. To the left is a sash window in a recess, and in the top floor are two sash windows. The doorway is in the passage and has a doorcase with a cornice.	II
4 Thorney Hills; 54.32816°N 2.73938°W	—	c. 1823	A house designed for the use of George Webster, it is stuccoed and has bands, an eaves cornice and blocking course, and a slate roof. There are two storeys with a cellar, and three bays. On the right steps lead down to a cellar door, and in the left bay steps lead up to a recessed doorway with a frieze containing wreaths and a pediment. The windows are sashes.	II
5 Thorney Hills; 54.32823°N 2.73940°W	—	c. 1823	A stone house on a plinth, with bands, a dentilled eaves cornice, a moulded cast iron gutter, and a slate roof. There are three storeys and two bays. On the ground floor, the right bay contains a semicircular-headed doorway with a fanlight, and in the left bay is a three-light sash window with pilasters and a cornice. There are two sash windows in each of the upper floors.	II
6 Thorney Hills; 54.32830°N 2.73931°W	—	c. 1823	A house in ashlar stone on a plinth, with bands, a moulded cast iron gutter on dentils, and a slate roof. There are three storeys and a symmetrical front of three bays. In the outer bays are doorways in architraves with semicircular heads and fanlights, and the windows are sashes.	II
7 Thorney Hills; 54.32838°N 2.73929°W		c. 1823	A house, later subdivided, in ashlar stone on a plinth, with bands, a moulded cast iron gutter, and a slate roof with two pedimented dormers. There are two storeys with attics, and three bays. In the ground floor is a doorway with an architrave, a fanlight and a cornice, and two sash windows to the left. The upper floor has a balcony with a balustrade, and contains a sash window, a French window, and a bay window.	II
9 Thorney Hills; 54.32863°N 2.73930°W	—	c. 1823	A house in ashlar stone on a plinth, with a band, a moulded cast iron gutter on dentils, and a slate roof. There are two storeys and three bays. In the ground floor is a semicircular-headed carriage arch with moulded imposts and a projecting keystone. The windows are sashes, those in the ground floor having recessed surrounds. The doorway, with a fanlight, is in the passage.	II
10, 10A, 11 and 11A Thorney Hills; 54.32883°N 2.73921°W	—	c. 1823	A pair of houses in ashlar stone on a plinth, with corniced pilasters, bands, a moulded cast iron gutter on dentils, and a slate roof. There are two storeys and seven bays overall. It contains a semicircular-headed passage that has a door with a semicircular fanlight on each side. On the front are three canted bay windows with cornices, and the windows are sashes.	II
Kentdale Nursing Home; 54.32849°N 2.73933°W	—	c. 1823	Originally a house, it is on a plinth, with corner pilasters, bands, projecting dentilled eaves, a moulded cast iron gutter, and a hipped slate roof. It has two storeys and a symmetrical front of three bays, flanked by single-storey arches linking to the adjacent buildings. The central bay projects forward, and contains a recessed door in an architrave with a pediment and a fanlight. On each side is a three-light sash window with a cornice, and a balcony with an ornamental iron balustrade. In the upper floor are three sash windows in architraves with consoles, the central window with consoles.	II
Aynam Lodge and Aynacote; 54.32701°N 2.74356°W	—	1823	A house by Francis Webster, later subdivided and used for other purposes, it is in ashlar stone on a plinth, with corner pilasters, bands, a moulded cast iron gutter on dentils, and a slate roof with two gabled dormers. There is a central block with two storeys and three bays, flanked by recessed single-storey, one-bay wings. The doorway has panelled pilasters and a cornice, and the windows are sash windows.	II
Kirkbie Kendal Lower School; 54.32792°N 2.73953°W	—	1823	Originally two houses designed by Francis and George Webster, and later used as a school. It is in stone on a plinth, and has corner pilasters, bands, a dentilled eaves cornice, a moulded cast iron gutter, and a hipped slate roof with dormers. There are three storeys and seven bays, the central bay recessed and containing a semicircular-headed carriage door. In the second bay is a doorway with an architrave and a semicircular fanlight, and in the sixth bays is a porch containing a similar doorway. Most of the windows are sashes. The south return has three bays, and contains a porch.	II
Town Hall, Magistrates Court, and Call Stone; 54.32688°N 2.74729°W		1824–25	This was originally built as Assembly Rooms by Francis and George Webster, it was converted into a town hall in 1858–59 by George Webster, and extended in 1891–93. The building is on a corner site, built in ashlar stone, the ground floor being rusticated, and it has slate roofs. There are two storeys with attics, and in the Lowther Street front there are also cellars; on the Highgate front are seven bays, with 14 bays on Lowther Street. On the front are two round-headed entrances, the larger on the left with a broken pediment containing a cartouche, and two round-headed windows. In the upper floor above the main doorway is a window in an architrave with a swan-neck pediment, flanked by pilasters carrying a segmental pediment. To the right is a loggiaa with two pairs of Ionic columns, a balcony, and a pediment. At the top of the building is a balustrade with urn finials. Rising from the roof is a clock tower with an ogee lead roof, a lantern and a weathervane. The tower is flanked by two dormers, that on the right having a Venetian window.	II
Beezon Lodge; 54.33119°N 2.74151°W	—	1825	A house designed by Francis Webster and later used as offices. It is in limestone on a plinth, and has corniced corner pilasters, bands, and slate roofs with gabled dormers and projecting eaves. There are two storeys, three bays, and a recessed lower single-bay wing to the right. On the front steps lead up to a porch with a cornice. The windows are sashes, with lunettes on the returns of the main block.	II
Façade of Kendal Gas Company Meter House; 54.32304°N 2.74544°W	—	1825	The façade was moved and placed on its present site in 1984. It is in ashlar stone and consists of a portico with a pediment. There is a semicircular-headed entrance flanked by engaged Tuscan columns outside which are pilasters, all on plinths. On the entablature is a carved inscription.	II
12 Collin Croft; 54.32616°N 2.74849°W	—	Early 19th century	A stone house with quoins, a dentilled eaves cornice, and a slate roof. There are three storeys with cellars, a symmetrical three-bay front, and a rear outshut. Steps lead up to a central doorway with a semicircular fanlight, and the windows are sashes.	II
16, 18, 19 and 20 Collin Croft; 54.32631°N 2.74918°W	—	Early 19th century	Originally warehouses and factories, later converted into dwellings, they are in stone with quoins and slate roofs. They have three storeys, most have a single bay, and they incorporate a pedestrian semicircular arch. The windows are a mix of casements and sashes.	II
30 Highgate; 54.32721°N 2.74769°W	—	Early 19th century (probable)	A stuccoed shop with rusticated quoins, a string course, an eaves cornice, and a slate roof. There are three storeys and a single bays. In the ground floor is a shop front, and above are sash windows, the window in the middle floor having an architrave and a swan-necked pediment. In the south return is a broken swan-necked pediment with a finial.	II
Wall with bee boles, 45 Highgate; 54.32651°N 2.74724°W	—	Early 19th century (probable)	The wall is in limestone with flat slate coping, and is about 2 metres (6 ft 7 in) high and 10 metres (33 ft) long. It contains three recesses with voussoirs for bee boles, about 1.25 metres (4 ft 1 in) high and wide.	II
Milestones, 128 Highgate; 54.32419°N 2.74740°W	—	Early 19th century (probable)	A pair of milestones probably provided for the turnpike trust, they flank the steps at the entrance to the Highgate Hotel. The milestones consist of two cylindrical stones about 2 feet (0.61 m) high. The left stone is painted with the distance in miles to London, and that on the right with the distance to Edinburgh.	II
30 Kirkland; 54.32261°N 2.74630°W		Early 19th century (probable)	Originally a house, later a post office, then a shop, it is rendered on a plinth, and has a slate roof. There are three bays and three storeys, the upper storeys being jettied, with a bressumer carried on four cast iron Doric columns. In the ground floor is a doorway with a fanlight and two shop windows, and above are sash windows.	II
23 and 25 Market Place; 54.32833°N 2.74608°W	—	Early 19th century	A shop that was remodelled in about 1853, it is in stone with a moulded cast iron gutter on dentils, and a slate roof. There are three storeys and four bays. In the ground floor is a shop front with panelled pilasters and a cornice, and above are sash windows.	II
35 and 37 Market Place; 54.32830°N 2.74567°W	—	Early 19th century (probable)	A pair of shops, No. 35 is in ashlar stone, and No. 37 is stuccoed; both have gutters on dentils and a slate roof. Each shop has a shop front, that of No. 35 with a cornice, and in the upper floors are sash windows.	II
Wall with bee boles, 4 Prospect Terrace; 54.32835°N 2.75115°W	—	Early 19th century (probable)	The wall is in limestone and is about 2.5 metres (8 ft 2 in) high at the upper end, and about 3.5 metres (11 ft) at the lower end, and has triangular coping. It contains four recesses with voussoirs for bee boles, about 1.5 metres (4 ft 11 in) high and 0.75 metres (2 ft 6 in) wide.	II
58–62 and entry to yard at 58 Stramongate; 54.32923°N 2.74304°W	—	Early 19th century	A house, later offices, incorporating a house to the right, now a shop. They are stuccoed, on a plinth, and have moulded gutters on dentils, slate roofs, and three storeys. The house on the left has five bays, and the other house has one. The left house has a central Tuscan doorcase with a pediment. In the left bay is a semicircular-headed carriage arch with impost blocks and a projecting keystone, and the other bays have sash windows with cornices. The house on the right has a shop front, and in the upper floors of both houses are sash windows.	II
98 Stricklandgate; 54.32977°N 2.74762°W	—	Early 19th century (probable)	A rendered shop with a moulded gutter on dentils, and a slate roof. There are two storeys with a cellar, and two bays. In the ground floor are two shop windows, one in an architrave, between them is a door with a fanlight, and to the right is another doorway. In the upper floor are casement windows.	II
157 Stricklandgate; 54.33186°N 2.74867°W	—	Early 19th century	A limestone house with quoins, a moulded gutter on dentils, and a slate roof. There are two storeys and a symmetrical three-bay front. In the centre is a semicircular-headed doorway with moulded imposts and a fanlight. The windows are sashes.	II
Sand Aires House; 54.32917°N 2.74250°W		1827	The original house was designed by George Webster with a front on New Road. It was later used as offices and was extended at right angles in a similar fashion along Stramongate in 1935. The building is in ashlar stone on a plinth, and has corner pilasters, bands, modillioned eaves, hipped slate roofs, and three storeys. The New Road front has five bays and a Doric porch. The Stramongate front has ten bays, and has a Doric porch with an inscribed frieze. The windows are sashes.	II
Shakespeare Inn and basement shop 54.32591°N 2.74774°W		1830	The public house is rendered on a plinth, with a band and a slate roof. There are three storeys, three bays, and a two-bay shop in the basement. Steps lead down to the shop, which has a wooden shop front with a cornice. In the floors above are sash windows. In the left bay of the ground floor is a carriage arch with moulded imposts, and a projecting inscribed keystone. The entrance is in the passage, approached by steps.	II
1 Town View; 54.33216°N 2.75139°W	—	1831	A house, later subdivided, it is in limestone, and parts have a plinth, quoins, corner pilasters, a band, a moulded cast iron gutter on dentils, and a slate roof that is partly hipped. There are two storeys and nine bays. On the front is a French window and doorways, some with fanlights, and most of the windows are sashes.	II
HSBC Bank; 54.32635°N 2.74775°W		1834–35	Designed by George Webster for the Westmorland Bank, it is in ashlar limestone on a plinth, with a band, an eaves cornice, a blocking course, and a slate roof. There are two storeys and five bays, the central three bays projecting forward, with giant pilasters. At the top of these is an entablature inscribed with the name of the bank, and surmounted by a life-size cast iron sculpture of a lion flanked by scrolled supporters. In the centre is a doorway with an architrave, a fanlight and a pediment, the doorway being approached by steps from the sides with railings. The windows are sashes in architraves.	II
32 Market Place; 54.32858°N 2.74580°W	—	Early to mid 19th century	A stone house with a slate roof, three storeys and a single bay. The doorway is in the passage to the yard on the left, and the windows are sashes.	II
Gate piers, 162 Stricklandgate; 54.33117°N 2.74800°W	—	Early to mid 19th century	The gate piers are in limestone. They are about 6 feet (1.8 m) high, with a square plan, a plinth, and a stepped pyramidal cap.	II
26A Stricklandgate and passage to north 54.32823°N 2.74733°W	—	Early to mid 19th century	A stone shop with pilasters, a band, a dentilled cornice, and a slate roof. There are three storeys and five bays. In the ground floor is a shop front with a cornice, and in the upper floors are sashes.	II
Smoke House, Dr Manning's Yard; 54.32556°N 2.74687°W	—	Early to mid 19th century (probable)	The building is in stone and has a slate roof with a louvred vent running along the ridge. It is in a single storey, and has boarded doors on both sides.	II
Coach house, Mint House; 54.34243°N 2.73684°W	—	Early to mid 19th century	The coach house is stuccoed and has a slate roof with ball finials and a wrought iron weathervane. There are three doorways, two with elliptical heads, and mullioned windows with hood moulds.	II
Church of Holy Trinity and St George; 54.32809°N 2.74351°W		1835–37	A Roman Catholic Church designed by George Webster in Early English style, it is in ashlar limestone on a chamfered plinth, and has slate roofs. At each corner is a stepped buttress, and flanking the entrance bay are taller octagonal buttresses, all rising to pinnacles. The church consists of a nave without aisles, a chancel and a porch. In a niche above the door is a statue of Saint George and the Dragon. The windows are lancets and in the chancel are three stepped lancets.	II*
St Thomas' Church; 54.33159°N 2.74918°W		1835–37	The church, designed by George Webster, is in stone on a chamfered plinth, and has stepped buttresses with gabled tops, a partly embattled parapet, and a slate roof. The church consists of a nave, a chancel, a north octagonal vestry, and an embraced west tower. The tower has four stages with a clock face in the third stage, and an embattled parapet. The windows are lancets.	II
Rainbow Hotel and entry to yard at 32 Highgate; 54.32717°N 2.74768°W	—	1836	A stuccoed public house with a cornice on dentils and a slate roof. There are three storeys with cellars, and two bays, the left bay canted on the corner. In the right bay is an elliptical-headed carriage arch, to the left are the main doorway and cellar doors, and in the upper floors are sash windows.	II
Spital Farmhouse; 54.34210°N 2.72952°W	—	1836	The farmhouse is stuccoed on a plinth, and has quoins and a hipped slate roof. There are two storeys and a symmetrical front of three bays. On the front is a porch and a doorway with a hood mould. The windows on the front and sides have two pointed lights and mullions and hood moulds. At the rear is an elliptical-headed doorway and a horizontally-sliding sash window.	II
52 and 54 Kirkland; 54.32227°N 2.74553°W	—	1837	Originally two houses, later offices, the building is in ashlar stone on a plinth, with a band and a slate roof. There are three storeys and four bays. In the second bay of the ground floor is a carriage entrance with an elliptical head, pilasters, and impost blocks. There are three casement windows in the top floor, and the other windows are sashes.	II
28 Finkle Street; 54.32801°N 2.74601°W	—	1838	Originally a fire engine house with a registrar's office above, later shops and an office, the building is in limestone on a plinth, with a band and a slate roof. There are three storeys with an attic, and a symmetrical front of three bays. In the ground floor are three elliptical arches and a round-headed doorway, now converted into shop windows, and in the upper floors are sash windows. At the rear are steps with railings that lead up to a first floor doorway.	II
Parkside Bridge; 54.31984°N 2.72536°W	—	c. 1847	The bridge was built for the Kendal and Windermere Railway, designed by Joseph Locke and built by Thomas Brassey, to carry a farm track over the railway. It is in limestone and consists of a single elliptical arch. The bridge has voussoirs on impost bands, a moulded string course, and splayed parapets with flat copings.	II
65 Castle Street; 54.33048°N 2.73617°W	—	Mid 19th century	A limestone house with quoins, a band, and a hipped slate roof. There are two storeys and a symmetrical front of three bays. The central doorway has pilasters and a cornice, and above the door is a fanlight. The windows are sashes.	II
10 Market Place; 54.32856°N 2.74631°W	—	Mid 19th century	A stuccoed shop with end pilasters, string courses, and a slate roof. There are four storeys and three bays. In the ground floor is a 20th-century shop front, in the first and second floors are sash windows, and in the top floor the windows are casements, all between pilasters.	II
11 and entrance to yard of 9 Market Place; 54.32830°N 2.74668°W	—	19th century	Originally a public house, later a shop, it was refronted in 1865. The shop is stuccoed, it has a moulded cast iron gutter on dentils and a slate roof. There are two storeys and two bays. In the ground floor is a projecting shop front with a cornice, and to the right is a door to a yard entrance. In the upper floor are sash windows.	II
Dun Horse; 54.32809°N 2.74478°W	—	19th century	A public house in rendered stone on a plinth, with a moulded cast iron gutter on dentils, and a slate roof. There are two storeys with cellars, and three bays. The doorway has a chamfered surround, and the windows are sashes.	II
Smoke house, Stricklandgate; 54.32773°N 2.74876°W	—	Mid 19th century (probable)	The building is in stone with quoins and has a slate roof with projecting eaves. There are two storeys, and on the roof are two louvres with pyramidal roofs. On the east front are two sliding doors, another door, and two rows of four louvres.	II
47 and 49 Branthwaite Brow; 54.32816°N 2.74544°W	—	1851	A shop in rendered stone with a slate roof, two storeys and two bays. In the ground floor is a wooden shop front with a cornice, and above are sash windows.	II
39, 43, 45, 45A and entry to yard of 41 Branthwaite Brow; 54.32822°N 2.74555°W	—	1853	A row of shops built in cast iron panels on timber framing with a slate roof. The south return is in stone with a pilaster. The panels are decorated with saltire crosses, there are some Gothic details, and the uprights around the doors have lions' heads. There are three storeys and six bays, and on the left is a yard entry. In the rest of the ground floor are wooden shop fronts with fluted pilasters and cornices; each shop having different detailing. Above are cast iron casement windows.	II*
2 Stramongate; 54.32809°N 2.74513°W	—	c 1859	A shop on a corner site in stone with quoins, a moulded cast iron gutter on dentils, and a slate roof. There are three storeys with cellars, and six bays, the bay on the corner curved. The main door is on the corner and has a fanlight; it is flanked by arcaded windows. The shop front has panelled pilasters and a cornice, and the windows in the upper floors are sashes.	II
36 Market Place; 54.32845°N 2.74571°W	—	1863	A stone shop and cottage with quoins, bands, a moulded cast iron gutter, and a slate roof with a central gabled dormer. There are three storeys and a cellar, and three bays. In the ground floor is a shop window with pilasters and a cornice and to the left is a door with a rectangular fanlight. The upper floor contains sash windows, and the cottage door is in the north return.	II
Former public wash house and baths 54.32671°N 2.74854°W		1864	The building was designed by Miles Thompson, swimming baths were added in 1884, and it has since been used for other purposes. It is in stone on a plinth, with a pilaster at the west end, and a slate roof. The entrance block is gabled and has three bays, a doorway with a fanlight and sash windows, all with round heads. The block is flanked by wings with dentilled cornices, one storey on the right and two on the left. Towards the east end is a drinking fountain in a niche, and at the northeast corner is a tall tapered octagonal chimney for the boiler house.	II
Parkside House and Parklands; 54.32194°N 2.72378°W	—	1865	A country house designed by J. S. Crowther in Gothic style, later subdivided. It is built in slate blocks on a plinth, with stone quoins, string courses, a slate roof, and two storeys. Parkside House, the former servants' quarters, also has attics and two bays. Parklands has four bays, a gabled porch with a shield in the gable, a canted bay window in the east front, and at the rear are an oriel window and a two-storey canted bay window, both with conical roofs. All the windows have mullions, and most have pointed heads.	II
Icehouse; 54.31116°N 2.74055°W	—	Mid to late 19th century (probable)	The icehouse is in stone and consists of a vaulted chamber with a flat floor. It has a circular plan, and is built into the bank of the Lancaster Canal.	II
Sundial; 54.32258°N 2.74518°W		1866	The sundial is in the churchyard of Kendal Parish Church. It is in limestone, and consists of a square monolithic shaft on two steps, with a moulded base and a moulded cap, on which is a brass plate and a gnomon.	II
Drinking Fountain, Brewery Arts Centre; 54.32459°N 2.74826°W	—	Late 19th century	The drinking fountain was moved from a site near Windermere railway station in the late 20th century. The base has a limestone plinth, a stepped cornice, slate infill, and limestone quoins. It has an octagonal plan, and is about 7 feet (2.1 m) high. On alternate faces are carved lion-head spouts and projecting marble bowls. On the top is a fluted column carrying a cast iron tapered lantern with a pyramidal roof and a finial.	II
Memorial cross, Kendal Parish Church; 54.32249°N 2.74529°W		Late 19th century	The cross was erected in memory of a former vicar of the church. It is in monolithic slate and has carved interlace decoration on all sides, and on the west side is an inscription.	II
Market Hall; 54.32857°N 2.74616°W		1887	The entrance to the market hall is in stone with quoins, a cornice above the ground floor, two string courses, and a slate roof. There are three storeys and three bays. In the ground floor are rusticated piers. The first two bays have entrances to the market hall with wrought iron gates, and lintels with cartouches. The right bay contains the doorway to No. 16 Market Place, which has a semicircular fanlight and a projecting keystone. In the upper floors are sash windows, those in the middle floor with segmental pediments, and in the top floor they have cast iron balconies.	II
56–62 Gillinggate; 54.32329°N 2.75051°W	—	1889	A row of four houses in Arts and Crafts style. They are in stone, partly rendered, on a chamfered plinth, with quoins, and a moulded bressumer between the floors. Three houses have a red-tiled roof and the other has concrete tiles. Each house has two storeys and two bays, and the windows are casements. No. 56 has an oriel window with a pyramidal roof, No. 58 has a two-storey canted bay window and a gabled dormer, Nos. 60 and 62 have single-storey bay windows, No. 60 has a large gable with a finial and a weathervane, and No. 62 has a smaller gable and a flat-roofed dormer.	II
Drinking fountain 54.32340°N 2.74494°W		1889	The drinking fountain is in the grounds of Abbot Hall. It consists of a monolithic stone obelisk about 9 feet (2.7 m) high on a corniced plinth about 3 feet (0.91 m) high. This stands on two octagonal sandstone steps. The obelisk is decorated with strapwork, and in the south face is a water spout and a basin.	II
Gilling Reane House, lodge and garage 54.32271°N 2.75254°W	—	c. 1891	The house, the integral lodge and the garage to the right are in Arts and Crafts style. They are in stone with quoins, some tile-hanging, and slate roofs. The house and lodge have two storeys with attics, and the garage has one storey. The house has a doorway with an arched surround, an oriel window above, and over this is a two-tier dormer. To the left of the doorway is a canted bay window, and the other windows are casements. The lodge is recessed, it has a jettied upper floor, and in the angle is a polygonal bay with a cupola roof. The garage has a pyramidal roof.	II
Lynnside House with garden wall 54.32341°N 2.75194°W	—	1891	A large house in Arts and Crafts style, it is in stone, partly slate-hung, on a high tapering plinth, and has quoins and hipped slate roofs with dormers. There are three storeys and cellars, and the windows are multi-light casements, some with slate canopies. The attached garden wall is about 20 feet (6.1 m) high, and its top is ramped and embattled.	II
Hill Cote and garden walls 54.32370°N 2.75231°W	—	1894	A house in Arts and Crafts style, built in stone, partly rendered, and with some tile hanging. It is on a splayed plinth, with quoins, a string course, overhanging bracketed eaves, and splayed red-tiled pyramidal roofs with a dormer. There are two storeys. On the west front is a two-storey canted porch flanked by single-storey bay windows, and most of the windows are casements. Running from the plinth is an embattled stone wall from about 15 feet (4.6 m) to about 6 feet (1.8 m) high containing a doorway with a pediment.	II
United Reformed Church; 54.32518°N 2.74848°W		1898	The church is built in limestone with sandstone dressings, it has a roof of Westmorland slate, it is in Early English style, and has a nave with an apse at the west end. The entrance front is at the east and is gabled and flanked by buttresses rising to pinnacles. In the centre, steps lead up to double doors over which is a pointed arch containing six small lancet windows. Above this are tall lancet windows and a multifoil window, and on the apex of the gable is a Celtic cross finial. Along the sides are two tiers of round-headed windows.	II
Cropper Memorial; 54.32420°N 2.74445°W		1901	The memorial is to James Cropper who was member of parliament for Kendal during the 19th century. It stands in the grounds of Abbot Hall, and consists of a monolithic upright slate slab about 10 feet (3.0 m) high set on a flat slate slab. On the front is a circular copper panel containing a bust in relief. Around and below it are inscriptions, and on the back is a carved oak shoot and five inscribed panels.	II
Carnegie Library and railings 54.32919°N 2.74741°W		1908	The library is built in limestone and sandstone on a plinth, and has a dentilled cornice, a corniced parapet, and a hipped slate roof. On the roof is an octagonal polychrome louvred vent. There is a single tall storey with an attic and cellars, and a symmetrical front of seven bays. The central bay has an open pediment containing a dated cartouche, and unfluted Ionic columns. In the centre, steps lead up to a doorway with a pediment and an inscribed panel. The outer bays contain square headed casement windows in pedimented architraves, and segmental-headed cellar windows. In front of the library are wrought iron railings.	II
Littleholme; 54.32876°N 2.72264°W	—	1909	A house designed by Charles Voysey, it is in stone with quoins, a large pyramidal roof, and two storeys. At the front is a long flat-roofed wooden porch, and a doorway with semicircular arch. The windows have flat mullions, and the stair window also has transoms.	II
Parish Hall; 54.32210°N 2.74414°W	—	1912	The parish hall is in stone with buttresses, it has a slate roof with stone coping, and is in Perpendicular style. It consists of a hall with aisles at the sides and at the west end. At the west end is a porch that has a doorway with a four-centred arched head, an embattled parapet, and mullioned windows.	II
War Memorial, Netherfield Works; 54.32055°N 2.74408°W		c. 1920	The war memorial is in the grounds of the former Netherfield shoe and boot works, and was designed by W. G. Collingwood. It is in Westmorland green slate, and consists of Celtic-style wheel-head cross. Carrying the cross is a rectangular tapering shaft on a two-tiered plinth on a two-stepped base. In the centre of the cross is a boss, the front of the cross and the shaft have interlace decoration, and on the plinth are inscriptions and the names of the employees who were lost in the two World Wars.	II
War memorial, Market Place; 54.32842°N 2.74707°W		1921	The war memorial, in Market Place, consists of a life-size bronze statue of an infantryman from the First World War. The statue stands on a square monolithic tapering plinth about 5 feet (1.5 m) high. On the plinth are inscriptions, and bronze panels with the names of those lost in both World Wars. The plinth stands on two sandstone steps, and the memorial is surrounded by a chain fence.	II
County Offices; 54.33165°N 2.74767°W		1937–39	The council offices are in limestone they have hipped slate roofs, and are in Neo-Georgian style. There are two storeys with a basement, and the building has a rectangular plan with a front range of nine bays, and side ranges of ten bays. In the centre steps lead up to a square-headed entrance with an architrave and recessed doors with a fanlight containing a coat of arms. The windows are sashes with square heads. In the centre of the roof is a clock turret, with a lozenge-shaped clock face, corner pilasters, an entablature, a metal balustrade, and a pyramidal roof with a weathervane.	II
