= St Thomas' Church, Kendal =

Coordinates: 54.3316°N 2.7493°W

St Thomas' Church
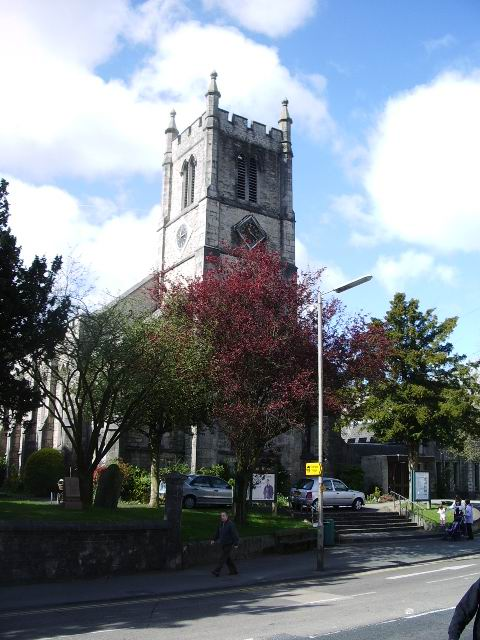

- Location in South Lakeland Location in Cumbria
- OS grid reference: SD 514,932
- Location: Stricklandgate, Kendal, Cumbria
- Country: England
- Denomination: Anglican
- Churchmanship: Evangelical
- Website: St Thomas, Kendal

History
- Status: Parish church
- Consecrated: 5 July 1837

Architecture
- Functional status: Active
- Heritage designation: Grade II
- Designated: 30 January 1985
- Architect: George Webster
- Architectural type: Church
- Style: Gothic Revival
- Groundbreaking: 1835
- Completed: 1837

Specifications
- Materials: Stone, slate roof

Administration
- Province: York
- Diocese: Carlisle
- Archdeaconry: Westmorland and Furness
- Deanery: Kendal
- Parish: St. Thomas, Kendal

Clergy
- Vicar: Revd George Briggs

St Thomas' Church is in Stricklandgate, Kendal, Cumbria, England. It is an active Anglican parish church in the deanery of Kendal, the archdeaconry of Westmorland and Furness, and the diocese of Carlisle. The church is recorded in the National Heritage List for England as a designated Grade II listed building. Along with St George's Church and the Church of Holy Trinity and St George it is one of three churches in the town designed by local architect George Webster.

== History ==
Building of the church started in 1835, and it was consecrated on 5 July 1837. It was designed by the local architect George Webster. The church has subsequently altered, and additions have been made; in particular the interior has been extensively remodelled.

== Architecture ==
=== Exterior ===
The church is constructed in stone with slate roofs. (Note: The church is orientated northeast/southwest, and the liturgical directions are used in this article.) Its plan consists of a six-bay nave without aisles and a short chancel, an octagonal north vestry, and an embraced west tower. The tower is in four stages. In the bottom stage are triple lancet windows flanked by single lancets; there are three stepped lancets in the second stage; a clock (moved from the town hall) in the third stage; and paired lancet bell openings in the top stage. Surmounting the tower is a castellated parapet with corner pinnacles. Along the sides of the church are paired lancets, separated by stepped buttresses. At the east end are three stepped lancets. The church is entered from the north side, through a concrete parish centre that was added in 1980.

=== Interior ===
The interior of the church has been much altered. The nave is fully carpeted, and has been opened up into the parish centre on the north side.

There is a gallery, but the original galleries have been removed along with the tie-beams and king posts of the roof.

== Fittings ==
The pulpit of 1882 has been reduced, and the reredos has been removed. In the east window is near-abstract stained glass made by Shrigley and Hunt.

There appear to have been two 19th century pipe organs in the building which were removed before 1900. There is a reference to the church wanting to dispose of an organ in the 1860s because it was too loud. An organ was built in about 1881 by Thomas Wilkinson of Kendal, and was moved to Hightown Methodist Church, Luton, in 1898. This was replaced by a three-manual organ made by Harrison and Harrison, which was enlarged by the same company in 1909.

== Appraisal ==
The church was designated as a Grade II listed building on 30 January 1985. Grade II is the lowest of the three grades of listing, and is granted to buildings that are "nationally important and of special interest".

== See also ==
- Listed buildings in Kendal
- List of works by George Webster

== References and notes ==
Notes

Citations
