= Conishead Priory =

Priory in Ulverston, Cumbria, England

Coordinates: 54.1732°N 3.0670°W

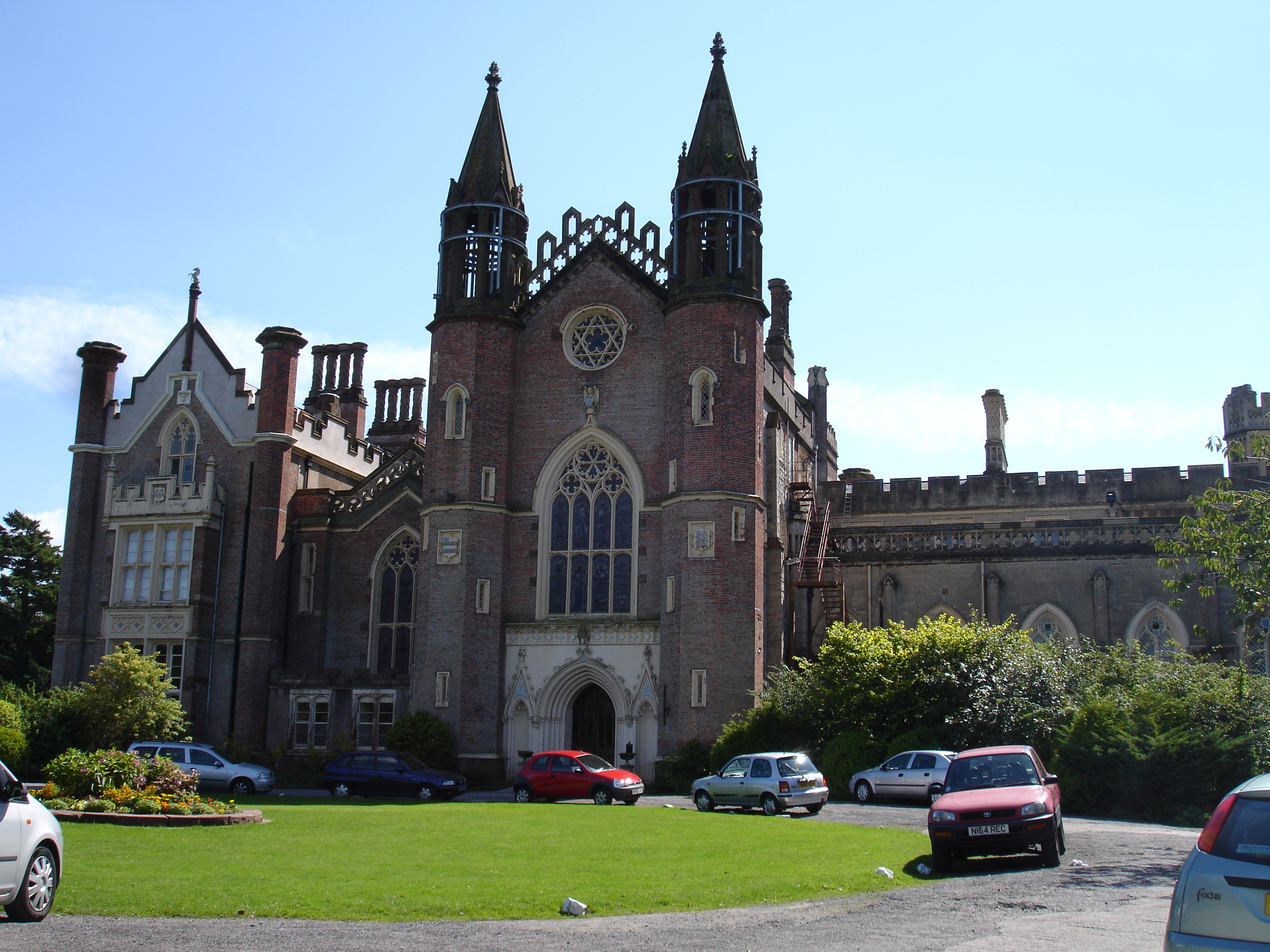
Conishead Priory

Conishead Priory is a large Gothic Revival building on the Furness peninsula near Ulverston in Cumbria. The priory's name translates literally as "King's Hill Priory". Since 1976, the building has been occupied by a Buddhist community.

== History of the site ==
A house of Augustinian canons was founded at Conishead on the grounds of the present house in the twelfth century. The origins of the medieval priory was as a hospital which subsequently developed into a priory during the reign of Henry II (1154–1189). It is thought to have been established as early as 1167 by Gamel de Pennington. However, William de Lancaster II, baron of Kendal also claimed to be the owner.

It existed until the dissolution of the monasteries. After the dissolution the lands were then leased to Thomas Stanley, 2nd Baron Monteagle and afterwards briefly belonged to William Paget, 1st Baron Paget, before being bought in 1548 by William Sandys, a brother of Archbishop Edwin Sandys. Sandys was killed in a dispute in 1559 and is commemorated by an effigy in Ulverston church; his son Francis died without issue in 1583 leaving two married half-sisters, Margaret Dodding and Barbara Philipson, as heirs. Margaret's grandson George Dodding, a zealous Roundhead, later bought out the Philipsons; his son Miles died in 1683 leaving two daughters. One died childless, so the estate passed through her sister Sarah, wife of John Bradyll of Portfield, to their son Dodding Braddyll, Whig MP for Lancaster 1715–22. Dodding's son Thomas Braddyll in turn died unmarried in 1776, leaving Conishead to Wilson Gale, his first cousin once removed, who changed his name to Wilson Gale-Braddyll. Throughout this period the building itself changed considerably.

== The present building ==
Wilson Gale-Braddyll was succeeded in 1818 by his only son Lt-Col Thomas (1776–1862), who further altered the family name the following year by becoming Thomas Richmond-Gale-Braddyll. In 1821 he served as high sheriff of Lancashire, and that same year Conishead was demolished to make way for a new house.

The designer of the new Conishead was Philip William Wyatt, son of James Wyatt and one of an illustrious clan of architects. However, he was not destined to enjoy success in the field; he was dismissed from the project while it was in progress, was declared bankrupt in 1833 and sent to the debtors' prison, dying in 1835. Wyatt's replacement was George Webster of Kendal, from another architectural family. It is possible that Webster was originally asked to draw up plans before Wyatt was approached; there are a pair of existing plans of the 1st and 2nd floors of the present priory dated 1818 – the year that Bradyll inherited the estate.

The building took some 20 years and around £140,000 to complete, but its owner was bankrupted by disastrous speculations in the Durham coal mines and forced to sell it to Henry William Askew of Minard Castle, Inverary in 1850. The Priory was Askew's residence until he sold it in 1874, during which time he remortgaged it at least five times using it as collateral. It appears he also shared the Priory with Henry Schneider, the iron mining entrepreneur. In 1874 the Priory was bought by John Poole, a local solicitor of Ulverston, who sold much of the estate for development; one of the main purchasers was William Gradwell, a developer from Barrow in Furness. Poole sold the Priory and surrounding park (approx. 150 acres) to a Scottish syndicate in 1878, who converted it to a spa hotel. The hotel was a popular destination until at least the turn of the century, so much so that the Priory had its own railway station. In 1883, the Furness Railway Company opened the Bardsea Loop Line which never went further than Conishead Priory. The railway embankment and station houses can still be seen today, situated just to the east of the house. In 1925 the Priory and its grounds were bought by the Conishead Co. Ltd, who made considerable improvements. Just four years later the Priory was up for sale again, and purchased, somewhat ironically, by the Durham Miners Welfare Committee for £35,000. The Committee employed the architect Arthur Kellett of Barnard Castle to redesign the interior for the priory's use as a convalescent home.

The Priory was opened as a convalescent home on 29 August 1930, with up to 150 miners being admitted every two weeks to recuperate from mining injuries. In 1933 the Welfare Committee built a Staff House in the grounds some 200m north of the Priory with two cottages for ground staff at either end. The Staff house later became a nursing home before being converted into apartments. During World War II the Priory served as an emergency hospital for air-raid victims although in the event it was not used as such but was instead used for wounded servicemen, approximately 8,000 of whom were treated there. The Welfare Committee reopened the Priory as a convalescent home in April 1946.

In 1970 the Welfare Committee put the Priory and its grounds up for sale, and in 1972 it sold, the estate split in two, one part and the Staff House to a Mr. Fisher and the Priory and other part to a Mr William Jones of Wigan. There were plans for the Priory to revert to a hotel and a caravan park in the grounds, but, unable to get planning permission, the Priory was put back on the market.

== Buddhist Community ==
Since 1976, Conishead Priory has been the home of Buddhist communities. The Kadampa Temple for World Peace, a Kadampa Buddhist Temple, has been built in the grounds.

== See also ==
- Grade II* listed buildings in Westmorland and Furness
- Listed buildings in Ulverston
- List of works by George Webster
