= St Thomas' Church, Milnthorpe =

Coordinates: 54.2268°N 2.7702°W

St Thomas' Church
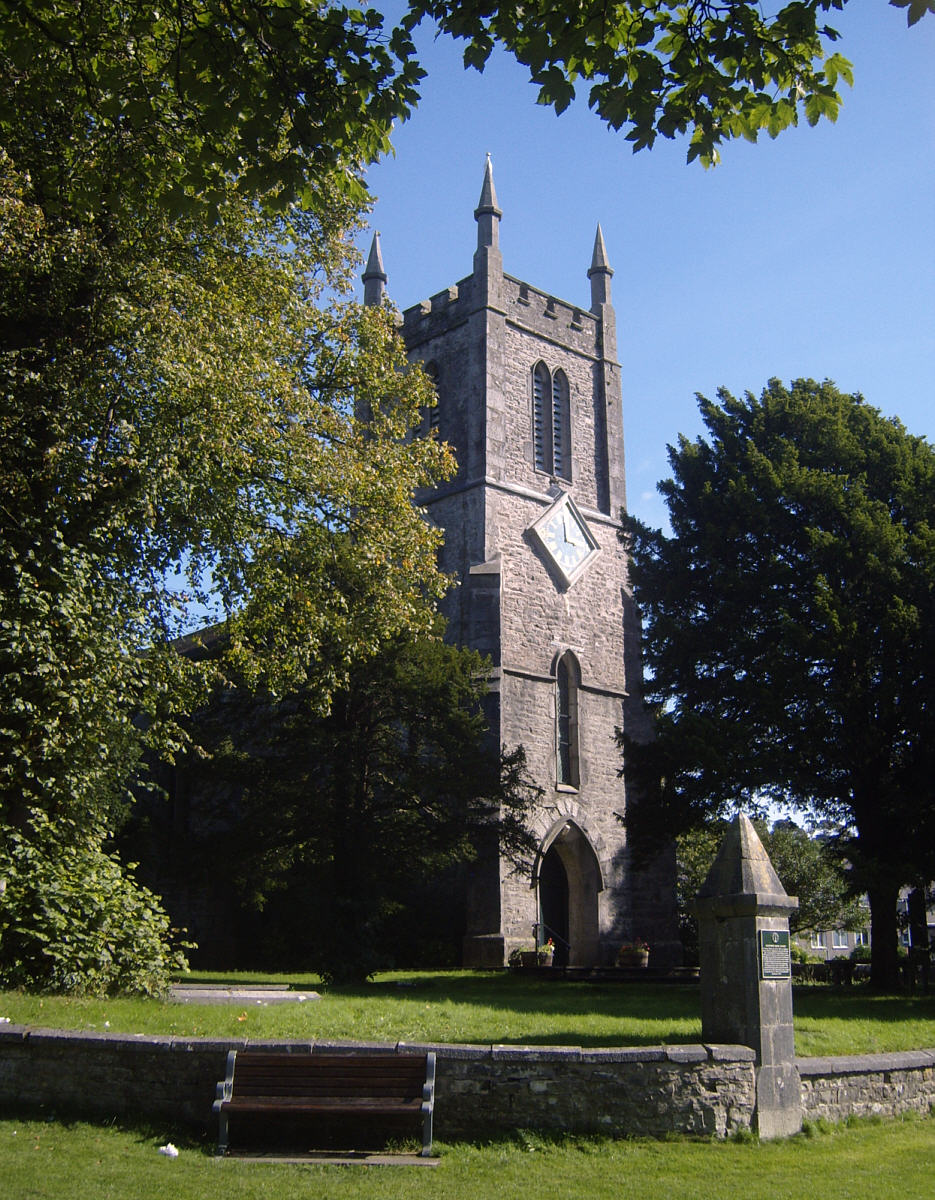
- Tower of St Thomas' Church

- Location in South Lakeland Location in Cumbria
- OS grid reference: SD 49885 81504
- Location: Milnthorpe, Cumbria
- Country: England
- Denomination: Anglican
- Website: St Thomas, Milnthorpe

History
- Status: Parish church

Architecture
- Functional status: Active
- Architect(s): George Webster; Joseph Bintley; Austin and Paley
- Architectural type: Church
- Style: Gothic Revival
- Groundbreaking: 1835

Specifications
- Materials: Limestone, sandstone dressings

Administration
- Province: York
- Diocese: Carlisle
- Archdeaconry: Westmorland and Furness
- Deanery: Kendal
- Parish: Heversham and Milnthorpe

St Thomas' Church is in the village of Milnthorpe, Cumbria, England. It is an active Anglican parish church in the deanery of Kendal, the archdeaconry of Westmorland and Furness, and the diocese of Carlisle.

== History ==
The church was built in 1835–37 to a design by the Kendal architect George Webster, providing accommodation for a congregation of 600. The chancel was added in 1883 by Joseph Bintley. In 1912 the Lancaster architects Austin and Paley carried out alterations at the west end of the church. The west gallery was removed in 1982 and the church was sub-divided by a wall.

== Architecture ==
St Thomas' is constructed in limestone with sandstone dressings. The church has a nave, a chancel, and a west tower. The nave contains paired lancet windows and has thin buttresses. The chancel is in Early English style. Many of the windows contain stained glass; these include two by F. Barrow of Milnthorpe dated 1872 and 1885, two by A. Burrow dated 1886 and 1890, and others by Heaton, Butler and Bayne (1879), Shrigley and Hunt (1898), and Abbott and Company (1928). There is a ring of six bells, cast in 1912 by John Taylor & Co of Loughborough.

== See also ==
- List of works by George Webster
- List of ecclesiastical works by Austin and Paley (1895–1914)
