= List of works by George Webster =

George Webster (1797–1864) was an English architect who practised in Kendal, Westmorland. He worked mainly in domestic architecture, designing new houses, and remodelling older houses. His early designs were mainly in Neoclassical (Greek Revival) style. He later pioneered the use of the Tudor Revival style, and in some of his latest designs he incorporated Italianate features. He also designed some churches, all in Gothic Revival style, plus some public and commercial buildings.

== Key ==
Grade	Criteria
I	Buildings of exceptional interest, sometimes considered to be internationally important.
II*	Particularly important buildings of more than special interest.
II	Buildings of national importance and special interest.
"—" denotes a work that is not graded.

== Buildings ==
Name	Location	Photograph	Date	Notes	Grade
Elba Monument	Burneside, Cumbria; 54.34915°N 2.77546°W		1814	An obelisk erected by James Bateman of Tolson Hall in honour of William Pitt the Younger.	II
Read Hall	Read, Lancashire; 53.8090°N 2.3700°W		1818–25	A large country house on the site of an earlier house, for John Fort, in Greek Revival style, including an Ionic portico.	II*
Esthwaite Lodge	Hawkshead, Cumbria; 54.3617°N 2.9948°W		1819–21	Attributed to Francis and George Webster, with its Doric porch it is described as a "Grecian doll's house". It was built for the historian Thomas Alcock Beck, and later used as a youth hostel.	II
Thorny Hills	Kendal, Cumbria; 54.3280°N 2.7395°W		1823	A terrace of houses designed with Francis Webster. No 4 was built for George Webster himself. Each house, or pair of houses, is listed separately at Grade II.	II
St Mary's Church	Rydal, Cumbria; 54.4474°N 2.9818°W		1823–24	Webster's first church, built for Lady le Fleming of Rydal Hall, in Perpendicular style.	II*
St Oswald's Church	Burneside, Cumbria; 54.3547°N 2.7635°W	—	1823–28	Demolished and rebuilt in 1880–81.	—
Scale How	Ambleside, Cumbria; 54.4354°N 2.9643°W	—	1824–25	A house originating in about 1790 remodelled and enlarged. Later part of Charlotte Mason College, which has been incorporated into the University of Cumbria.	II
St Anne's Church	Haverthwaite, Cumbria; 54.2487°N 3.0039°W		1824–25	A new church, plain with pointed windows containing Y-tracery.	II
Helme Lodge	Kendal, Cumbria; 54.3079°N 2.7397°W	—	1824–27	A country house designed with Francis Webster in Greek Revival style.	II
St Mark	Natland, Cumbria; 54.2961°N 2.7374°W		1825	A new church, replaced in 1909–10 by Austin and Paley.	—
Eshton Hall	Eshton, North Yorkshire; 54.0000°N 2.0964°W		1825–27	A new large country house for Matthew Wilson in Elizabethan Revival style.	II*
Terrace wall, Eshton Hall	Eshton, North Yorkshire; 54.0000°N 2.0959°W	—	1825–27	Retaining terrace wall to the southeast of Eshton Hall.	II
Gatepiers and gates, Eshton Hall	Eshton, North Yorkshire; 53.9991°N 2.0965°W	—	1825–27	Gatepiers and gates at the entrance to Eshton Hall.	II
Underley Hall	Kirkby Lonsdale, Cumbria; 54.2157°N 2.5919°W		1825–28	A new country house for Alexander Nowell in Jacobean style. It was later used as a school.	II*
Rigmaden Park	Mansergh, Cumbria; 54.2572°N 2.6000°W		1825–28	A country house designed with Francis Webster in Greek Revival style for Christopher Wilson.	II
St Mary's Church	Dalton-in-Furness, Cumbria; 54.1549°N 3.1870°W	—	1825–30	Rebuilding of an older church. This in turn was replaced in 1884–85 by Paley and Austin.	—
Hutton in the Forest Hall	Unthank, Skelton, Cumbria; 54.7140°N 2.8390°W		1826	Rebuilt the south tower of a fortified country house dating from the 14th or 15th century.	I
Dallam Tower	Milnthorpe, Cumbria; 54.2225°N 2.7830°W		1826	Remodelled the country house, including the addition of a Doric porch.	I
Thurland Castle	Tunstall, Lancashire; 54.1520°N 2.5978°W	—	1826–29	Additions; the building was almost completely destroyed by a fire. It was virtually rebuilt in 1879–85 by Paley and Austin.	—
Sand Aire House	Kendal, Cumbria; 54.3291°N 2.7425°W	—	1827–28	Described as the "grandest" of Webster's town houses; built for Daniel Harrison, incorporating a Doric porch. Later used as offices.	II
Eller How	Lindale, Cumbria; 54.2246°N 2.9032°W	—	After 1827	A country house acting as a retreat for the Webster family. George made additions after his father's death.	—
Cliffe Castle	Keighley, West Yorkshire; 53.8751°N 1.9138°W		1828–33	Cliffe Hall was built as a country house for Christopher Netherwood and extended by Henry Butterfield between 1875 and 1880. It was renamed Cliffe Castle due to its castle-like appearance.	II
St Paul's Church	Lindale, Cumbria; 54.2160°N 2.899°W		1828–29	Probably designed by Webster, without a fee. With a west tower and lancet windows.	II
St Stephen's Church	New Hutton, Cumbria; 54.3148°N 2.6738°W		1828–29	A new church with a west tower.	II
Moreton Hall	Whalley, Lancashire; 53.8066°N 2.3948°W	—	1828–29	A country house for John Taylor, demolished in 1955.	—
Lodge, Read Hall	Read, Lancashire; 53.8051°N 2.3776°W	—	1820s	Lodge to the hall, in Greek Revival style, with Doric portio.	II
Holy Trinity Church	Casterton, Cumbria; 54.2115°N 2.5771°W		1831–33	Almost certainly designed by Webster for Rev William Carus Wilson, with a chancel added in about 1860 by E. G. Paley.	II
Whittington Hall	Whittington, Lancashire; 54.1807°N 2.6201°W		1831–36	A new house in Tudor Revival style.	II*
Penwortham Priory	Penwortham, Lancashire; 53.7486°N 2.7299°W		1832	A Jacobean mansion built on the site of a Benedictine priory, demolished in the early 20th century.	—
Town Hall	Settle, North Yorkshire; 54.0685°N 2.2768°W		1832	In Gothic Revival style.	II
Holme Island House	Grange-over-Sands, Cumbria; 54.1957°N 2.8869°W	—	c. 1832	Original house attributed to Webster, who enlarged it in the 1840s.	—
Bank Hall	Bretherton, Lancashire; 53.6756°N 2.8151°W		1832–33	A Jacobean mansion, with an Elizabethan core, altered, restored and extended 1832–33, Derelict from 1972 to 2017. Restored 2017–2021.	II*
Croftlands	Caton, Lancashire; 54.0747°N 2.7252°W	—	1833	A country house remodelled from an earlier house in Tudor Revival style.	II
Moreton Hall Lodge	Whalley, Lancashire; 53.8082°N 2.3879°W		1833	A lodge to Moreton Hall in Jacobean style.	II
Whelprigg House	Barbon, Cumbria; 54.2260°N 2.5637°W		1834	A new country house for Joseph Gibson in Jacobean style.	II
Downham Hall	Downham, Lancashire; 53.8946°N 2.3315°W		1834–35	A country house, possibly originating in the medieval era, remodelling of which started in 1779, and completed by Webster, which included the addition of a Doric portio. There have been alterations and additions since.	II*
Westmorland Bank	Kendal, Cumbria; 54.3263°N 2.7478°W	—	1834–35	Later used by the Midland Bank, then by HSBC.	II
Church of Holy Trinity and St George	Kendal, Cumbria; 54.3280°N 2.7435°W		1835–37	A Roman Catholic church in Early English style.	II*
St Thomas' Church	Kendal, Cumbria; 54.3316°N 2.7492°W		1835–37	A church in Gothic Revival style with a west tower.	II
St Thomas' Church	Milnthorpe, Cumbria; 54.2268°N 2.7702°W		1835–37	A new church with a west tower and lancet windows.	—
Trustee Savings Bank	Ulverston, Cumbria; 54.1959°N 3.0937°W		1836–38	In Italianate style. The clock tower was added in 1844.	II
Boarbank Hall	Allithwaite, Cumbria; 54.1825°N 2.9513°W	—	c. 1837	A country house, damaged by fire in 1870, and rebuilt. Webster also designed the lodge.	—
St John's Church	Grayrigg, Cumbria; 54.3683°N 2.6501°W		1837–38	A new church; the tower was rebuilt in 1869.	II
Black Rock Villa	Grange-over-Sands, Cumbria; 54.1939°N 2.9079°W	—	1837–41	Built for himself by Webster.	—
Conishead Priory	Ulverston, Cumbria; 54.1732°N 3.0670°W		1838	The original building on the site was an Augustinian priory. The present house was commissioned in 1823 to a design by Philip Wyatt, but Webster took over and completed it. There have been subsequent owners and alterations. In 1976 the house became the Manjushri Kadampa Meditation Centre.	II*
Holker Hall	Holker, Cumbria; 54.1884°N 2.9837°W		1838–41	Rebuilding in Jacobean style.	II*
St George's Church	Kendal, Cumbria; 54.3298°N 2.7401°W		1838–41	A new church with a pair of stair turrets at the west end, later reduced in height.	—
Broughton Hall	Broughton, Craven, North Yorkshire; 53.9537°N 2.0886°W		1839	Added a large porte-cochère with Ionic columns to the front of the house, and a clock tower to the stables.	I
East Lodge, Broughton Hall	Broughton, Craven, North Yorkshire; 53.9553°N 2.0844°W	—	1839	The lodge has an Ionic portico and a cruciform plan, The gate piers, gates and wing walls are listed separately also at Grade II.	II
Holy Trinity Church	Holme, Cumbria; 54.2030°N 2.7314°W		1839	New church.	—
West Lodge	Edenhall, Cumbria; 54.6774°N 2.6880°W	—	1830s	A lodge to Eden Hall, a country house built in 1821, designed by Robert Smirke, and demolished in 1934. The lodge is in Greek Revival style, with a cruciform plan, and a Doric portio. The gate piers and wall to the southeast of the lodge, and those to the west of the lodge, are both listed separately at Grade II.	II
Stables, Whittington Hall	Whittington, Lancashire; 54.1808°N 2.6200°W	—	1830s	Altered in 1887 by Paley and Austin, and later used for domestic accommodation.	II
Coniston Hall Lodge	Coniston Cold, North Yorkshire; 53.9932°N 2.1587°W	—	c. 1840	A lodge to Coniston Hall, now demolished, with a Doric porch.	II
Summerfield House	Burrow, Lancashire; 54.1930°N 2.5857°W	—	1841	A country house, altered for Edward Tatham. Has a Doric porch.	II
St John's Church	Firbank, Cumbria; 54.3364°N 2.5737°W		1841	A small church, attributed to Webster.	II
St Leonard's Church	Cleator, Cumbria; 54.5069°N 3.5239°W	—	1841–42	The chancel is Norman, the nave was rebuilt by Webster in lancet style, and this was later reshaped and re-clad.	II
Holy Trinity Church	Bardsea, Cumbria; 54.1620°N 3.0719°W		1843–53	A new church with a west steeple.	II
Eden Grove	Bolton, Cumbria; 54.6057°N 2.5609°W	—	1844	Rebuilt for Richard Tinkler. Later a school.	—
Belsfield	Bowness-on-Windermere, Cumbria; 54.3618°N 2.9212°W		1844	Built as a house for Baroness de Sternberg, in Italianate style with a tower similar to that of Osborne House. Later the home of H. W. Schneider; afterwards extended and used as a hotel.	II
Town Hall	Kendal, Cumbria; 54.3269°N 2.7473°W		1859	Created from the former Whitehall Assembly Rooms, which had been designed in 1824–25 by George with his father. Later extended further.	II
