= Penwortham Priory =

- Penwortham Priory

- Location within the Borough of South Ribble

General information
- Architectural style: Jacobean
- Location: Penwortham, England
- Coordinates: 53.7486°N 2.7299°W
- Construction started: 1535
- Completed: 1850s
- Demolished: 1920s
- Client: Rawsthorne Family

Technical details
- Structural system: Brick

Design and construction
- Architect: George Webster

Penwortham Priory was first a Benedictine priory and, after the Dissolution of the Monasteries, a country house in the village of Penwortham, near Preston, Lancashire. The house was demolished as the village expanded into a town and a housing estate has replaced the mansion house and its grounds of which no trace remain.

== History ==
Before 1086, William the Conqueror gave this area of Lancashire to his relative, Roger the Poitevin. A small castle was built on the hill in Penwortham overlooking the river crossing and the castle mound (the motte) can still be seen behind St Mary's church. Roger gave land to the Benedictine Evesham Abbey and a small daughter cell was built at Penwortham, starting in 1075. The priory, dedicated to Saint Mary, had no independence from Evesham but functioned until the Dissolution of the Monasteries in 1535.

== Mansion ==
Once seized, the priory and its lands were sold to the Fleetwood family at a price of £3,088. The Fleetwoods built a mansion on the site which took the name of Penwortham Priory. The family continued to live there until 1749.

Ownership passed to the Rawsthorne family, who lived at the Priory from 1783 and in the mid-19th century they employed the architect George Webster to redesign the house.

The Penwortham Priory house later became a victim of the expansion of Penwortham village, especially after the First World War. Already in 1912 the Lodge had been taken down and rebuilt in Moor Lane, Hutton. The house itself was finally demolished in 1925 to make way for housing.

The priory is still part of Penwortham Golf Club's logo to this day.

== See also ==
- List of works by George Webster
