= St George's Church, Kendal =

Coordinates: 54.3298°N 2.7401°W

St George's Church
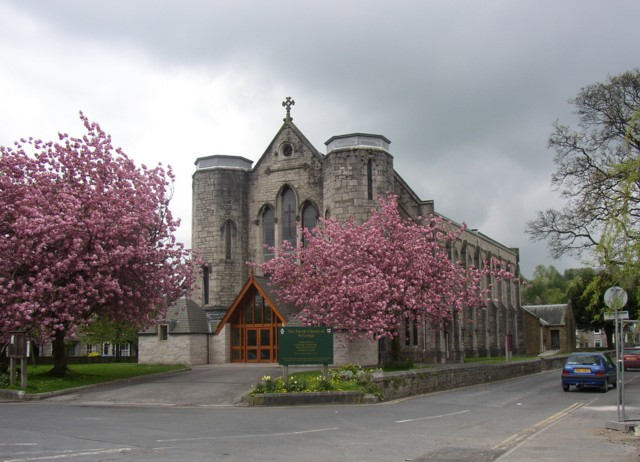
- West end of St George's Church, Kendal

- Location in South Lakeland Location in Cumbria
- OS grid reference: SD 51967 92943
- Location: Castle Street, Kendal, Cumbria
- Country: England
- Denomination: Anglican
- Website: St George, Kendal

History
- Status: Parish church
- Founded: 1754
- Dedication: Saint George

Architecture
- Functional status: Active
- Architect(s): George Webster; Austin and Paley
- Architectural type: Church
- Style: Gothic Revival
- Groundbreaking: 1838
- Completed: 1910

Specifications
- Materials: Limestone, sandstone

Administration
- Province: York
- Diocese: Carlisle
- Archdeaconry: Westmorland and Furness
- Deanery: Kendal
- Parish: St George, Kendal

Clergy
- Vicar: Revd Michelle Woodcock

St George's Church is in Castle Street, Kendal, Cumbria, England. It is an active Anglican parish church in the deanery of Kendal, the archdeaconry of Westmorland and Furness, and the diocese of Carlisle. Its benefice is united with those of St Oswald, Burneside, St John, Grayrigg, St Mary, Longsleddale, St Thomas, Selside, and St John the Baptist, Skelsmergh, to form the Beacon Team Mission Community. It was a Commissioners' church, having received a grant towards its construction from the Church Building Commission.

== History ==
The church originated from a chapel of ease to Kendal Parish Church in 1754. This was located in a two-storey building in Kirkgate; the chapel occupied the upper storey, the ground floor was the butter market, and the basement was used as the gaol. The chapel closed when the present church was built in Castle Street. This was built between 1838 and 1841 to a design by the local architect George Webster. A grant of £4,242 (equivalent to £380,000 in 2025) was given towards its construction by the Church Building Commission. Between 1910 and 1914 a chancel, organ chamber and vestries were added, which had been designed by the Lancaster architects Austin and Paley in 1904. Originally at the west end of the church were twin octagonal towers with spires, the towers being 100 feet (30 m) high, but there were problems with their foundations. The towers were shortened in 1927, and in 1978 were reduced again, this time to the same height as the roof of the nave. In 1963 the two western bays were partitioned to create a side chapel and a meeting room. The galleries at the sides of the church were removed, and the west gallery was converted into a hall in the upper storey. In 2004 a narthex, flanked by two small pavilions, was built at the west end to provide a new entrance and toilets.

== Architecture ==
Webster's nave and tower bases are constructed in limestone and are in Early English style with thin lancet windows and buttresses. The chancel added by Austin and Paley is in sandstone, its style being Decorated. Inside the church, the wooden pulpit stands on columns of Peterhead granite, and the lectern is in the form of an eagle. The furnishings in the chancel are by Austin and Paley. The sanctuary is floored with Carrara marble and Crinoidal limestone from Dent. To the south of the chancel is a transept containing the choir and clergy vestries.

The three-manual pipe organ was made in 1883 by the local organ builders Wilkinson and Sons and is claimed to be the largest surviving example of the firm's work. In 1911 the same firm moved the instrument from its original home in the south gallery to the newly constructed organ chamber. In 1983 it was restored by Rushworth and Dreaper of Liverpool, the successor firm to Wilkinson.

== See also ==
- List of Commissioners' churches in Northeast and Northwest England
- List of works by George Webster
- List of ecclesiastical works by Austin and Paley (1895–1914)
