= Church of Holy Trinity and St George, Kendal =

Coordinates: 54.3280°N 2.7435°W

Church of Holy Trinity and St George
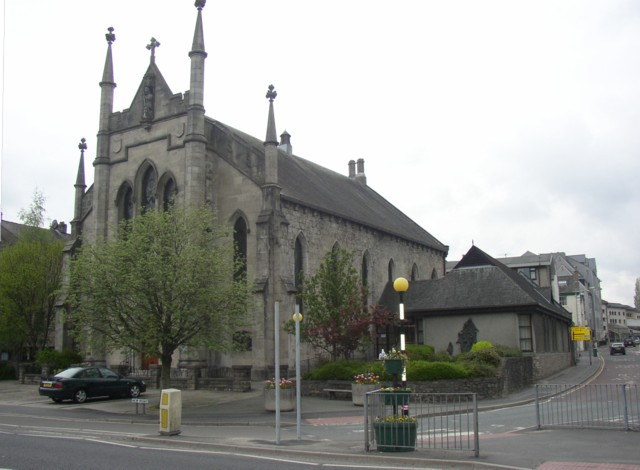

- Location in South Lakeland Location in Cumbria
- OS grid reference: SD 517,928
- Location: New Road, Kendal, Cumbria
- Country: England
- Denomination: Roman Catholic
- Website: www.kendalcatholicchurch.uk

History
- Status: Parish church
- Founder: Thomas Wilkinson
- Consecrated: 15 September 1837

Architecture
- Functional status: Active
- Heritage designation: Grade II*
- Designated: 30 January 1985
- Architect: George Webster
- Architectural type: Church
- Style: Gothic Revival
- Groundbreaking: 1835
- Completed: 1837
- Construction cost: £4,000

Specifications
- Materials: Limestone, slate roof

Administration
- Diocese: Lancaster

Clergy
- Priest: Fr Hugh Pollock

The Church of Holy Trinity and St George is in New Road, Kendal, Cumbria, England. It is an active Roman Catholic parish church in the diocese of Lancaster. It is recorded in the National Heritage List for England as a designated Grade II* listed building. The church was founded by the parish priest, Thomas Wilkinson, and designed by local architect George Webster. Architectural historians regard the church as the best of the three designed by Webster in the town.

== History ==
In the 18th century the Roman Catholics of Kendal met in a house in Stramongate, which was replaced by a chapel on the same site in 1793. This church was a replacement for that chapel. The chapel and the church were founded by the priest of the parish, Thomas Wilkinson. The church was designed by the local architect George Webster, and cost £4,000 (equivalent to £390,000 in 2025). The foundation stone was laid in October 1835, and the church was consecrated on 15 September 1837.

The church is sited near the River Kent and was flooded on a number of occasions. In 1908 the level of the floor was raised above the flood level. Electricity was installed in 1927. The original pipe organ was made by John Davis of Liverpool, but was damaged by floods in 1927 and replaced by a harmonium. This was in turn replaced in 1935 by a two-manual organ of unknown date made by the Orchestrelle Company. The organ was moved from Whitbarrow Lodge, Levens, and renovated by Henry Ainscough of Preston. It was renovated again between 1961 and 1966, probably by Rushworth and Dreaper of Liverpool. In 2000 this organ was replaced by an electronic organ, and in the same year an electronic bell system was installed. During the following year, extra seating was placed in the gallery where the organ had been sited. In 2002 the entrance to the church was improved by creating a new vestibule and narthex.

== Architecture ==
=== Exterior ===
The church is constructed in limestone with a slate roof, and is in Early English style. (Note: The church is orientated southeast/northwest, and the liturgical directions are used in this article.) Its plan consists of a six-bay nave without aisles, a west porch and narthex, and a chancel. At the west end, the central portion projects forward and is gabled. This portion is flanked by octagonal buttresses, and there are stepped buttresses at the corners of the west front; all the buttresses are surmounted by pinnacles. Steps lead up to a pointed doorway with a hood mould. Above this are three stepped lancet windows, and there is a single lancet window on each side bay. In the gable is a statue of Saint George and the Dragon, which was carved by Thomas Duckett Senior, an employee of Webster. On the apex of the gable is a cross finial. Along the sides of the nave are six lancet windows. At the east end are three stepped lancets, and single lancets on the sides of the chancel.

=== Interior ===
Inside the church is a west gallery carried on a four-bay arcade with slender columns. On the sides of the chancel are two large niches, each with a crocketed gable containing a statue by Thomas Duckett. The statue on the left depicts Ecce Homo, (Note: These were words spoken by Pontius Pilate, and can be translated as "Behold, the man!".) and that on the right Saint George. The chancel rail is in cast iron and contains panels with pierced trefoil heads. The octagonal pulpit is wooden and panelled, and the stone font is also octagonal. On each side of the doorway is an octagonal marble holy water stoup, made by Sylvester Mooney and dated 1837.

In the porch are four squares of 17th-century Flemish glass. The stained glass in the east wall is by Hardman & Co. The central window contains the kneeling figure of Wilkinson offering the church to Christ. The flanking windows represent Saint Cuthbert and Saint George. The glass in the side windows of the chancel are by H. Barnett, and depict Saint Joseph and Saint Anne. In the south wall of the nave is more stained glass by Hardman, and also glass by Mayer of Munich.

=== Appraisal ===
The church was designated as a Grade II* listed building on 30 January 1985. Grade II* is the middle of the three grades of listing, and is granted to "particularly important buildings of more than special interest". The architectural historians Matthew Hyde and Nikolaus Pevsner regard it as "much the best" of the three churches designed by Webster in Kendal, and remark on its "wide and brightly lit interior".

== See also ==
- Listed buildings in Kendal
- List of works by George Webster

== References and notes ==
Notes

Citations
