= Change Bridge, Kendal =

Bridge at Kendal, England

Change Bridge
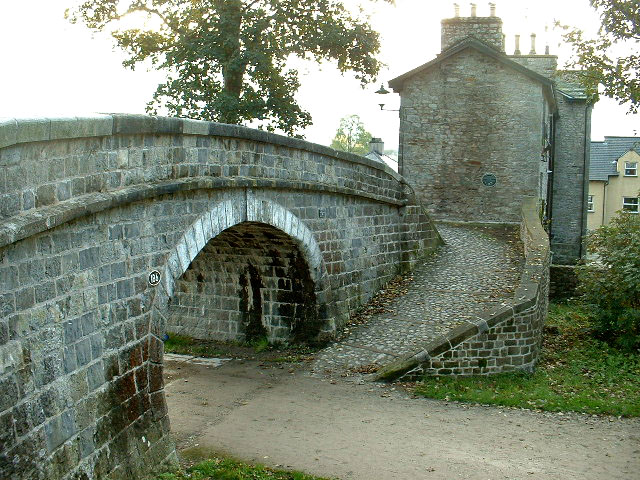
- The bridge in 2005, looking south
- Coordinates: 54.3190378°N 2.7391192°W
- Carries: Garden Road
- Crosses: Lancaster Canal (formerly)
- Locale: Kendal, Cumbria, England

History
- Opened: c. 1817 (208 years ago)

Change Bridge is a Grade II listed single-arch changeline bridge spanning what was formerly a section of the Lancaster Canal in the English market town of Kendal, Cumbria. The structure dates to around 1817. Horses pulling laden barges crossed from one side of the canal to the other, to avoid the coal wharves on the northwestern side of the bridge. It now carries Garden Road, and is believed to be the only change bridge in Cumbria.

The bridge is probably the work of John Fletcher, based on earlier designs by John Rennie the Elder. Rennie's route for the canal was authorised in 1792.

It is constructed of squared coursed limestone with limestone voussoirs. Ramped paths lead to and from either side, with the cobblestones of the western ramp still intact.

Kendal Civic Society restored the bridge in 2002 to celebrate the Golden Jubilee of Queen Elizabeth II.

== See also ==
- Listed buildings in Kendal
