= Kendal Parish Church =

- Holy Trinity Church, Kendal
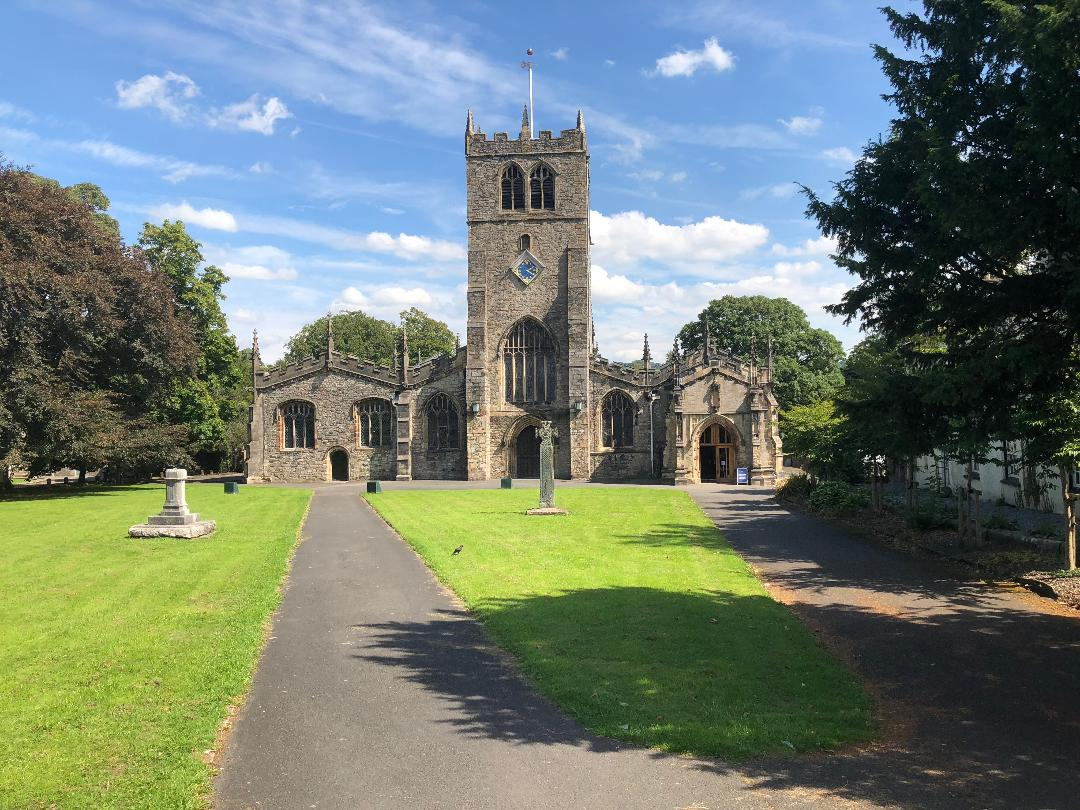

- Location within the former South Lakeland district Location within Cumbria
- 54.3225°N 2.7446°W
- OS grid reference: SD 51683 92137
- Location: Kendal, Cumbria, England
- Country: England
- Denomination: Church of England
- Website: kendalparishchurch.co.uk

History
- Status: Active

Architecture
- Functional status: Parish church
- Heritage designation: Grade I listed
- Designated: 24 April 1951
- Completed: 1201

Specifications
- Capacity: 1100

Administration
- Province: Province of York

Clergy
- Vicar: Revd Canon Shanthi Thompson

Kendal Parish Church, also known as the Holy Trinity Church due to its dedication to the Holy Trinity, is the Anglican parish church of Kendal, Cumbria, England. It is recorded in the National Heritage List for England as a designated Grade I listed building.

Visitors to the church are struck by its size and the lightness of the interior. This lightness is due to the unusual construction of five aisles, separated by columns and allowing generous window area.

The nave is 800 years old and the other aisles have been added over the centuries so that, in its heyday, a congregation of 1100 was regularly accommodated.

== History ==
=== Anglo-Saxon church ===
The Domesday Book refers to a church built on the site during the Anglo-Saxon period. It has been suggested that the Anglo-Saxons used material "robbed out" from the ruined Roman fort at Watercrook to the south of the town. The shaft of an Anglian cross, housed in the Parr Chapel, is dated at approximately AD 850.

=== Norman church onwards ===
Westmorland was only subdued by the Normans in 1092 and Ivo Taillebois (Anglicized, the name is translated to John Talbot) became the first Norman Baron of Kentdale, he gave the church and its lands to St. Mary's Abbey in York. In 1189, the inhabitants of Kendal were massacred in church by Duncan, Earl of Fife.

The arch over the piscina was found carved with the date 1201 during Victorian restoration (1829). The building dates from at least 1232 according to written sources, with a record from this year referencing an indulgence issued for fabric repairs.

The Parr Chapel was built by the Parr family in the fourteenth century, and the family coats of arms are to be seen on the ceiling. The maidenheads also featured on the walls had long been associated with the Parr family badge/arms. The device of a maidens head couped below the breast vested in ermine and gold; her hair of the last, or; and her head encircled with a wreath of red and white roses was taken from the Ros of Kendal family (ancestors of the Parrs). The same motif can be found in the Royal badge created by Queen Katherine after she became Queen. The large tomb in this chapel is that of William Parr, 1st Baron Parr of Kendal, grandfather of Katherine Parr, the last Queen Consort of King Henry VIII.

== Organs ==
The church contains two organs:

- at the West end, the main organ by J.W. Walker 1969 (45/3M+P) incorporating a 19th-century instrument by Willis
- at the East end, the choir organ by Bevington c.1885 (11/2M+P) was bought in 2002

== Gallery ==
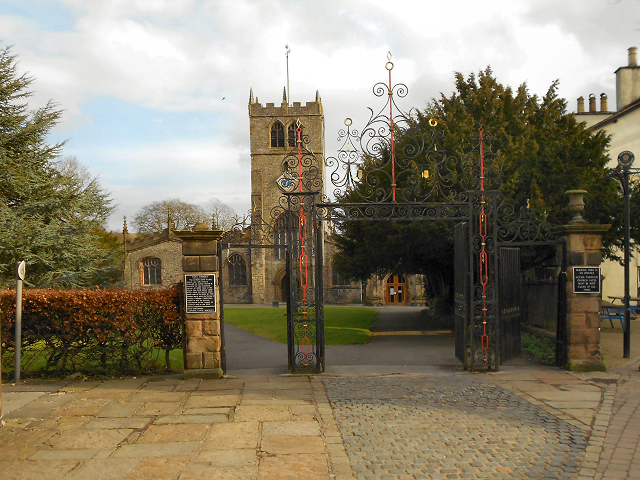
West end through the church gates

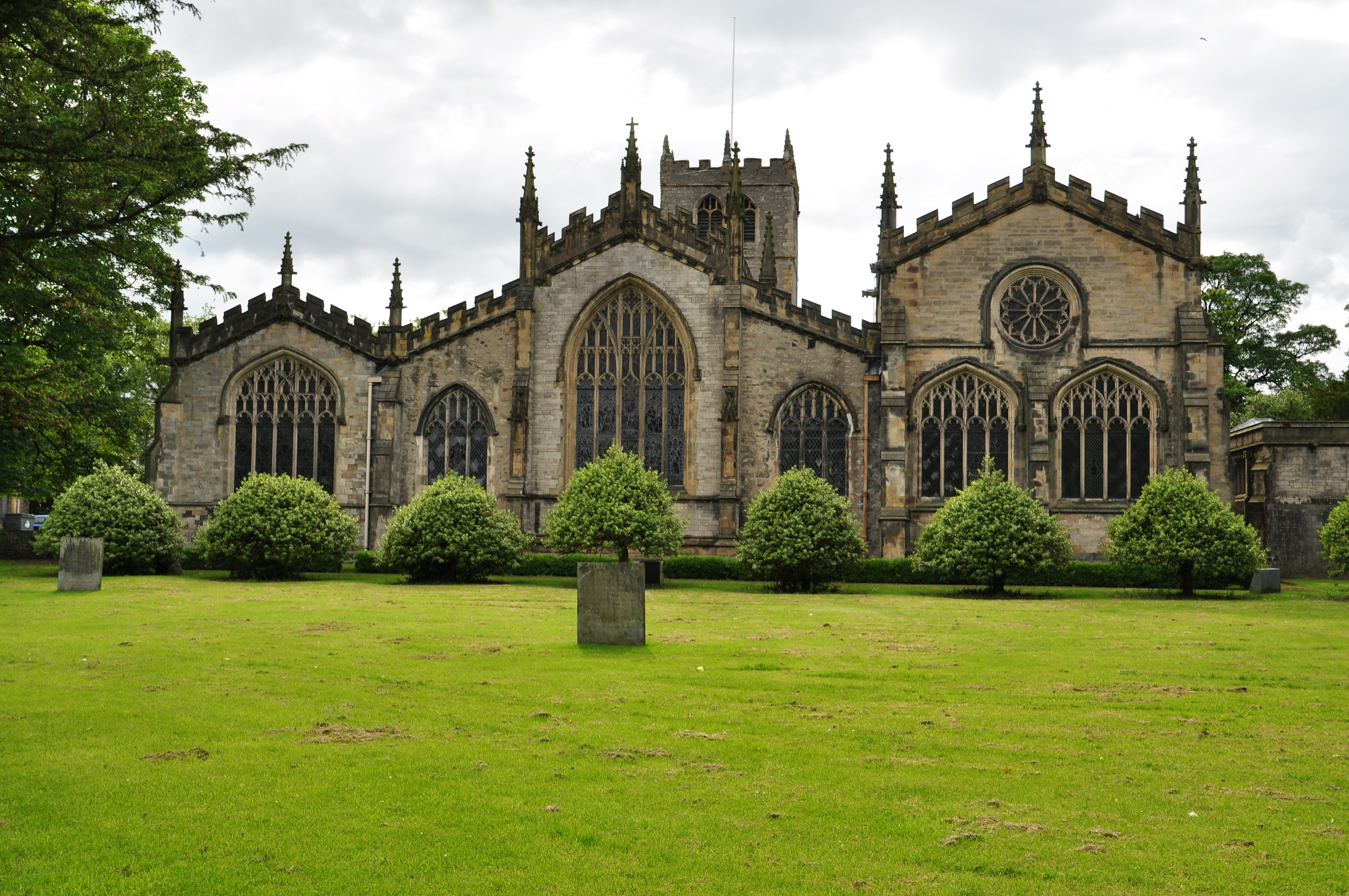
View of the east end of the church

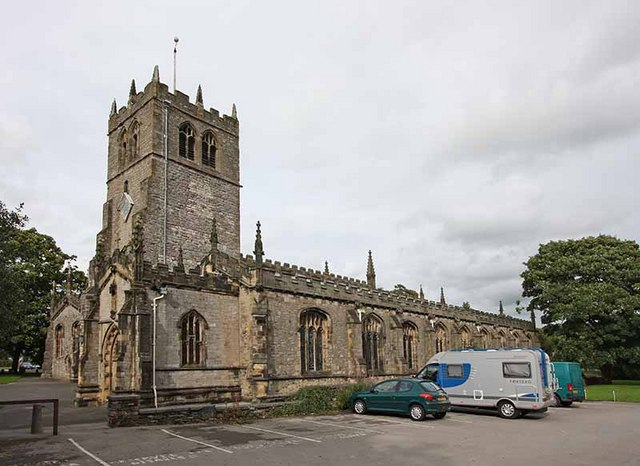
View of the south side of the church

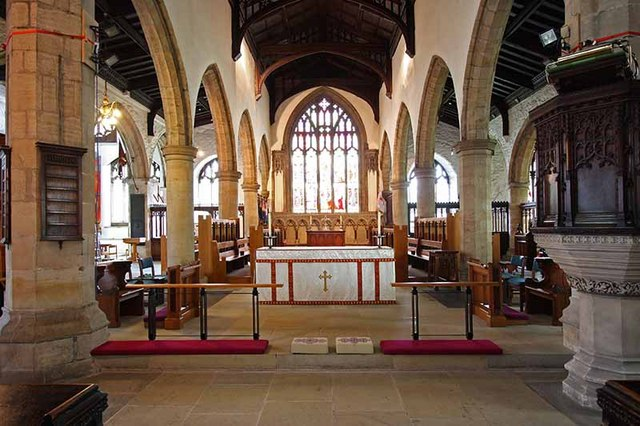
Chancel of the church

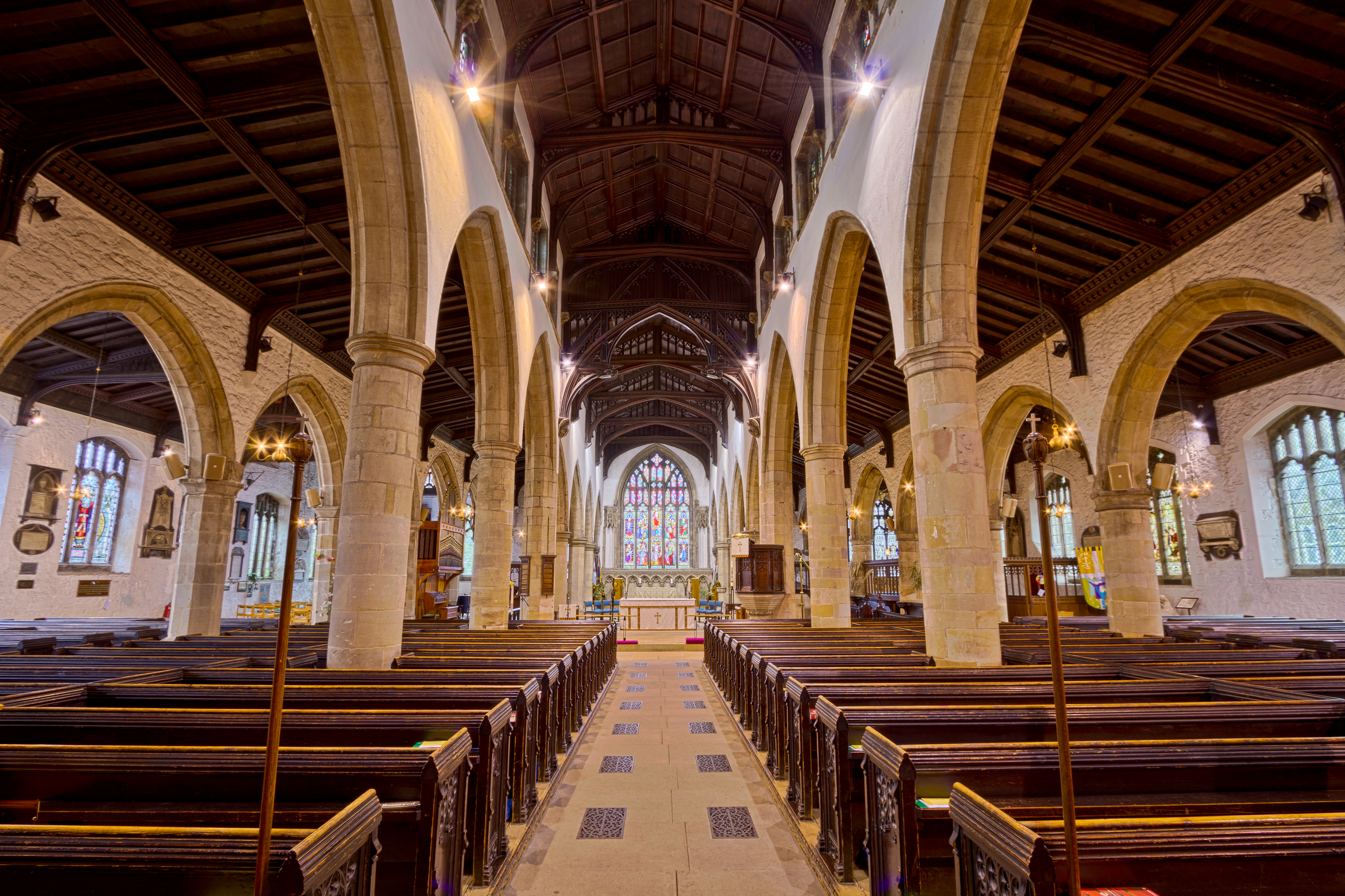
Nave of the church

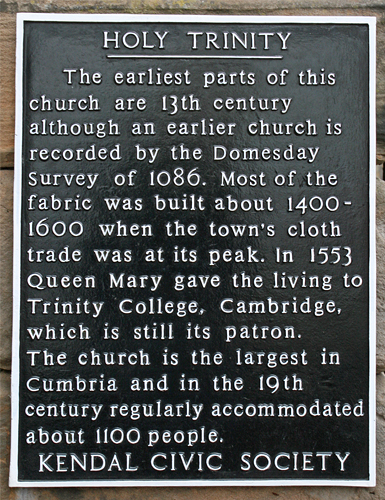
Plaque with short history

== See also ==
- Grade I listed churches in Cumbria
- Listed buildings in Kendal
