= Francis Webster =

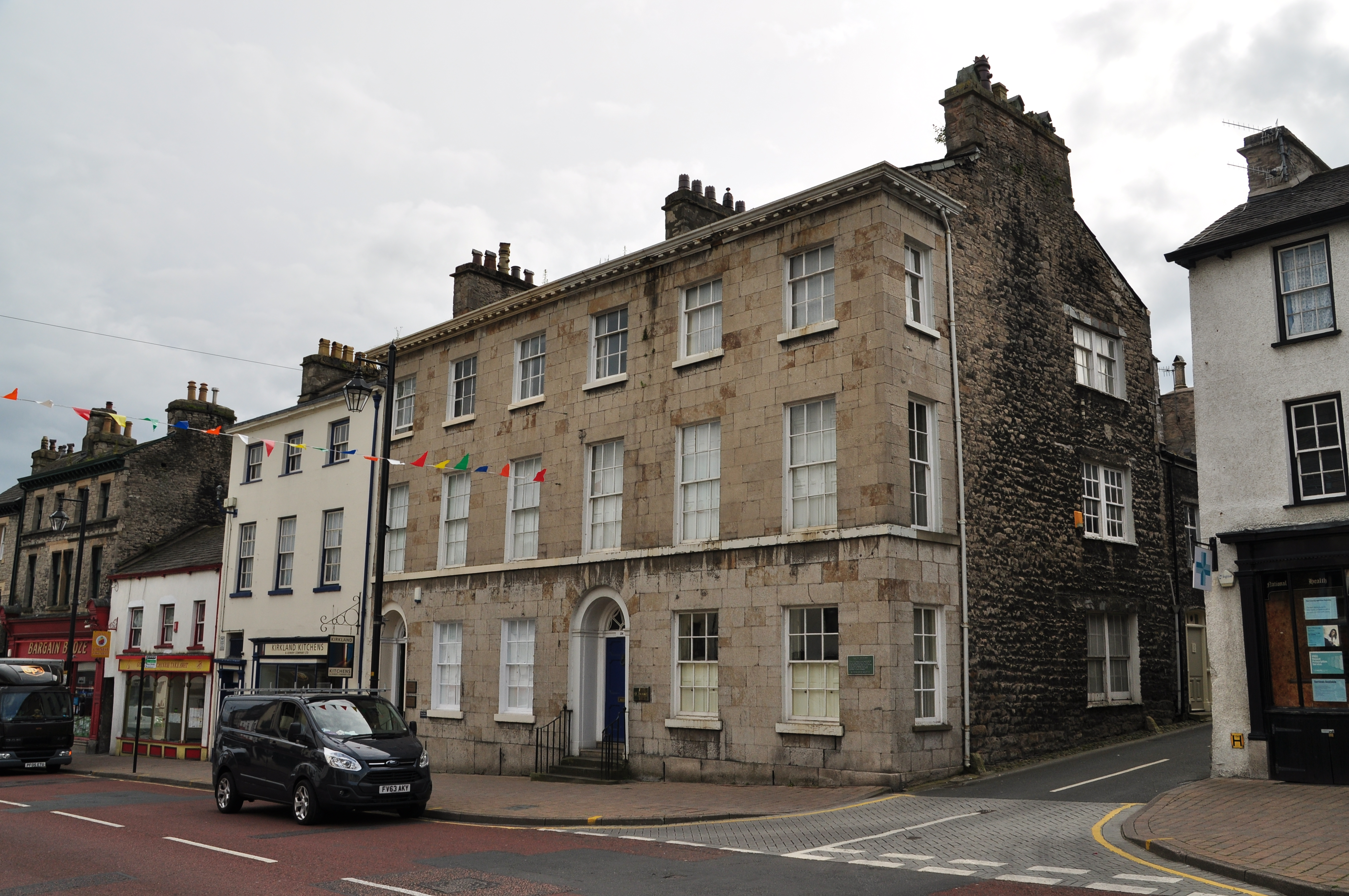
A pair of Georgian houses by Webster. They are dated about 1798.

Francis Webster (1767–1827) was an architect who worked in Kendal, Westmorland, England. He has been described as "the first to introduce the public profession of architecture into Kendal".

Webster's family had been masons and marble polishers. He arrived in the town in about 1787 and by the end of the century he was designing houses. During the early 19th century, he designed a new Meeting House for the town's Quakers, and was also involved with the promotion and building of the Lancaster Canal which reached Kendal in 1819.

== Legacy ==
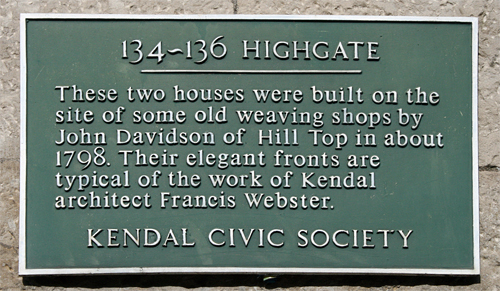
Plaque

Kendal Civic Society has put plaques commemorating Francis Webster on several of the buildings he designed. There are also plaques to his son George (1797–1864) who became the most important architect in the area in the early to mid-19th century.
