= Friends Meeting House, Kendal =

Quaker meeting house in Kendal, Cumbria, England

Coordinates: 54.32849°N 2.74297°W

Kendal Friends Meeting House is a Friends meeting house of the Religious Society of Friends (Quakers) in Kendal, Cumbria, in north-western England.

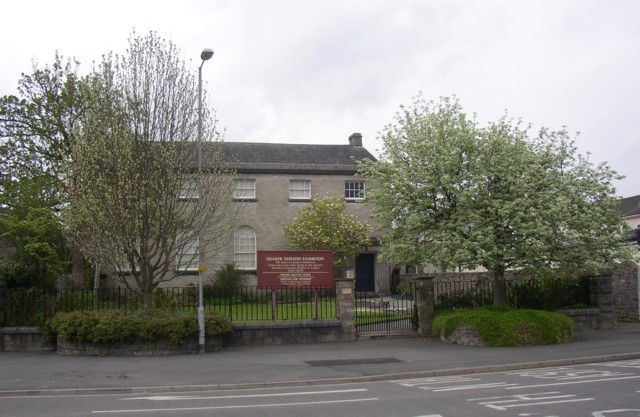
The Meeting House

There have been Quakers in Kendal since the 17th century when the town was visited by George Fox. The present meeting house was purpose-built in 1816 to replace the previous building used by local Quakers. Attendance at Sunday worship in 1816 numbered several hundred.

== Architecture ==
The limestone building was designed by local architect Francis Webster.

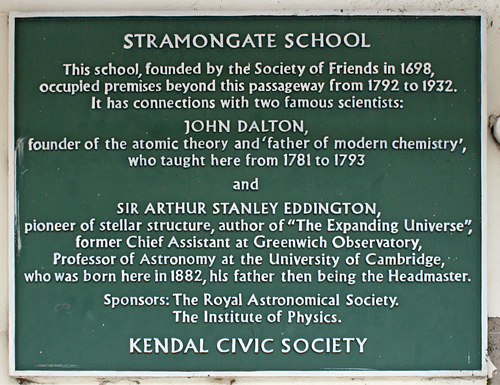
Plaque commemorating Stramongate School

In the 1930s Stramongate School, a Quaker institution opposite the meeting house, closed. The building had housed Sunday school classes and it was decided to move them to the Meeting House, where Webster's Georgian design was modified to provide classroom accommodation on the 1st floor.

== Quaker Tapestry ==
For thirty years the building was the home of the Quaker Tapestry. The tapestry, which was presented from 1994 as a visitor attraction, illustrates the history of Quakerism from the 17th century to the present day. Like the Bayeux Tapestry, the panels are embroidered rather than being tapestry in the strict sense of the word.

In 2025 rising costs and low visitor numbers meant that a new home had to be sought for the tapestry.

== Conservation ==
The meeting house has been designated a Grade II* listed building.
