= George Webster (architect) =

English architect (1797–1864)

- Born: 3 May 1797; Kendal, Westmorland, England
- Died: 16 April 1864 (aged 66) 1864; Eller How, Lindale, Lancashire, England
- Occupation: Architect
- Buildings: Bank Hall, Penwortham Priory, Read Hall, Settle Town Hall.

George Webster (3 May 1797 – 16 April 1864) was an English architect who practised in Kendal, which was at the time in Westmorland, and later in Cumbria. All of his works were executed near his practice, and were located in Cumbria, in north Lancashire, and in the adjacent parts of Yorkshire. Most of his work was carried out on domestic buildings, but he also designed churches, and public and commercial buildings.

== Early life ==
George Webster came from a family of builders who later became architects, his father Francis (1767–1827) being described as a " mason, builder, and architect" whose speciality was the production of marble chimney-pieces and funerary monuments. It is not known how George received his architectural training, but he joined his father's business as a partner, and in 1818, he designed for the country house of Read Hall in Lancashire.

== Works ==
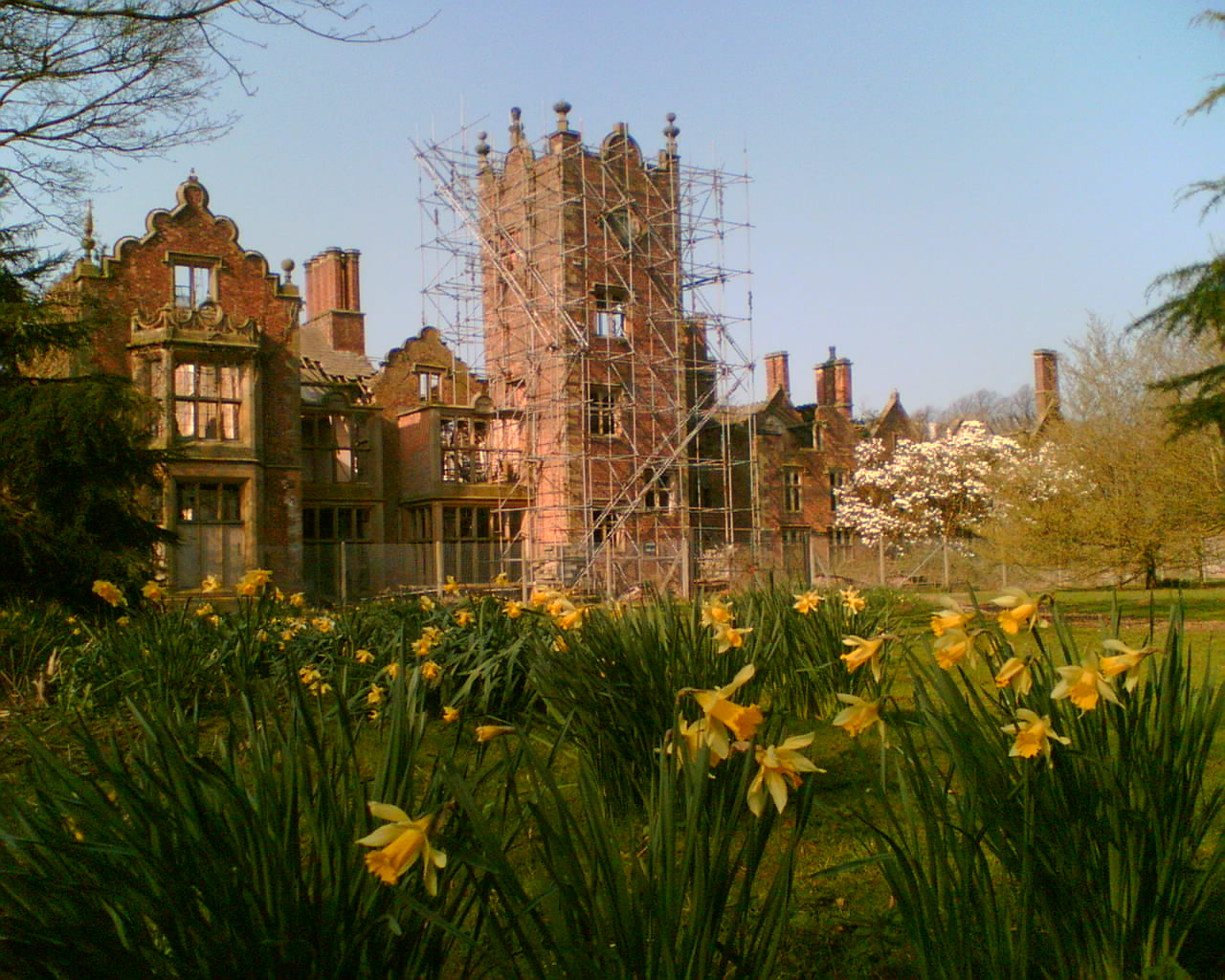
Bank Hall, Bretherton showing Webster's Italian bay windows and decorative gables

Webster's works were geographically confined to the area around his office in Kendal, in what is now Cumbria, the northern parts of Lancashire, and the adjacent parts of Yorkshire. Most of his work was carried out on large houses; in designing new houses, altering and extending others, and designing associated structures such as lodges, gateways and terraces. Among his major new houses were Eshton Hall in Eshton, North Yorkshire (1825–27), and Underley Hall in Kirkby Lonsdale, Cumbria (1825–28). He remodelled, or made significant additions to Hutton in the Forest, near Skelton, Cumbria (1826), Dallam Tower, near Milnthorpe, Cumbria (1826), Bank Hall, Bretherton, Lancashire (1832–33), Conishead Priory near Ulverston (1838), and Holker Hall, (1838–41) (both the latter being in Cumbria). His earlier designs were mainly in Neoclassical (or Greek Revival) style, often incorporating Doric or Ionic porticos, for example Read Hall, and Esthwaite Lodge near Hawkshead, Cumbria (1819–21). Later he was a pioneer in the use of the Tudor Revival style, using either Elizabethan features, for example at Eshton Hall, or Jacobean features, as at Underley Hall, Penwortham Priory, Penwortham, Lancashire (1832, since demolished), and Bank Hall. Towards the end of his career he incorporated Italianate features, at for example Belsfield, Bowness-on-Windermere, Cumbria (1844) where he included a tower in the style of Osborne House.

Webster designed at least 13 new churches and remodelled others; these were always in early Gothic Revival style. Most of his country churches are small, but he also designed three larger churches in his home town of Kendal; of these, St Thomas (1835–37) has aisles and lancet windows, and St George (1838–41) is more ambitious with twin turrets at the west end. Both of these, and most if not all of his country churches, were built for the Anglican church. His third Kendal church, which the authors of the Buildings of England series consider to be the best of the three, is the Roman Catholic Church of Holy Trinity and St George (1835–37). Webster also designed public buildings, including Settle Town Hall (1832), Kendal Town Hall (1859), commercial buildings, such as banks in Kendal (1834–35), and Ulverston (1836–38), and the Elba Monument near Burneside, Cumbria (1814).

== Family life and later career ==
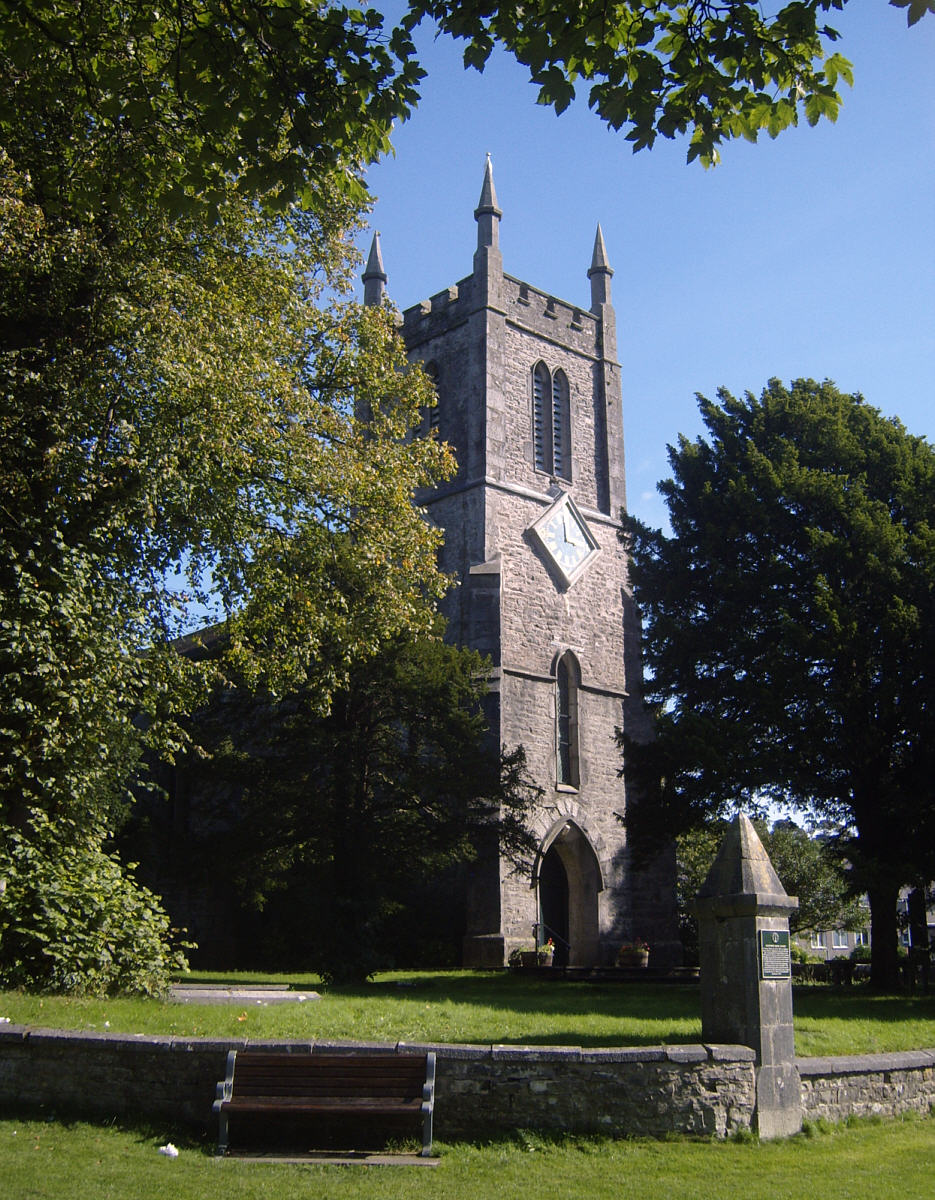
St Thomas' Church, Milnthorpe

In 1827 Webster married Eleanor Lowrey, with whom he had one son and four daughters. He was involved in the public life of Kendal, serving as mayor in 1829–30. One of his hobbies was collecting Roman coins, medals and antiquities, which possibly developed as a result of his visits to Italy from 1836. In 1845 he took his assistant of many years, Miles Thompson, into partnership, and then he supposedly retired from the practice.

Webster built his home "Eller How" in Lindale, Lancashire, in 1827 and lived there until his death. He left an estate of "under £25,000" (equivalent to £3,100,000 as of 2023). He is buried at St Paul's church in Lindale.

== See also ==
- List of works by George Webster
