= Franki Raffles =

British photographer and feminist campaigner (1955–1994)

- fair use image only
- Born: 17 October 1955; Salford, Lancashire, England
- Died: 6 December 1994 (aged 39)
- Education: University of St Andrews
- Known for: Photography
- Movement: Documentary Photography

Franki Raffles (17 October 1955 – 6 December 1994) was an English feminist social documentary photographer, best known for her work on the Zero Tolerance campaign. In her lifetime, she exhibited in Stills Gallery, Edinburgh; Mercury Gallery, London; The Corridor Gallery, Fife; Pearce Institute, Glasgow; and First of May Gallery, Edinburgh.

== Early life and education ==
Franki Raffles was born in Salford on 17 October 1955. Her parents were Eric and Gillian Raffles (née Posnansky). She had two older sisters, Sally and Emma, and a younger brother, Hugh. Her father managed the E Raffles and Co. textile factory, which had been established by her grandfather. In 1963 the family moved to London where Raffles was educated at Lady Eleanor Holles School.

As a teenager she was active in Jewish Youth organisations and aged fifteen she joined a trip to the Soviet Union visiting Moscow and Leningrad. In the summer of 1973, after leaving school and before university, she spent several months in Israel working as a swimming pool lifeguard in Tel Aviv.

In September 1973 Raffles took up a place at the University of St Andrews to study philosophy. During her time at St Andrews she was active in the Women's liberation movement and she held strong feminist views for the rest of her life. In 1976, she became the second student ever, and the first female student, to seek nomination for the Rectorship of the University - she was however unexpectedly disqualified for submitting her nomination seven minutes late. Her disqualification was upheld despite all other candidates offering to stand down in favour of a new deadline. She graduated MA (Hons) Moral Philosophy in 1977.

== Career ==
In 1978, Raffles moved to the Isle of Lewis to renovate a derelict farmhouse in the village of Callanish. It was here that she began to experiment with photography. In 1983 she moved to Edinburgh and began to find work as a self-employed photographer. She worked with community groups, charities and arts organisations, and taught evening classes. She arranged an exhibition of her early photographs entitled Lewis Women. She was awarded a Kodak Bursary and funding from Polaroid to develop and carry out an innovative educational photography project with children with special needs at Pinewood School – We can take Pictures.

In September 1983 she spent several weeks in Zimbabwe where, for the first time, she introduced an international perspective to her creative practice and photographed a local women's health project, an image from this project was later used in the Women's Press Diary.

In June 1984, together with her daughter Anna and her partner, Sandy, Raffles set off to make the journey across the Soviet Union on the trans-Siberian railway to China. The two women spent over twelve months travelling and also visited Tibet, India, Hong Kong and the Philippines. Throughout this period she was taking many photographs, recording women's lives and work. On her return to Scotland she began to select work from her travels for future exhibition. Back in Edinburgh in the summer of 1985 Raffles returned to working as a self-employed photographer. She continued building a portfolio of educational, community-based, charity and campaign project work.

In November 1985 she travelled to Mexico on a commission for The Mercury Gallery. In 1986 she carried out a project commissioned by Edinburgh District Council featuring the women athletes in the 13th Commonwealth Games held in Edinburgh. This resulted in an exhibition entitled Simply Women which toured community venues across the city. From then on she was attached to projects developed through Edinburgh District Council's Women's Committee and documented all aspects of the work of the Committee. In 1987/88 this included the booklet and touring exhibition To Let you Understand about women's lives and work across the city.

In 1989 Raffles' work was included in The Stills Gallery Touring Exhibition Picturing Women. She also continued to plan international projects and spent time in Dominica and in the Soviet Union. In 1990 an exhibition of photographs taken in Russia, Georgia and Ukraine, Women Workers, was shown in Glasgow and Rostov-on-Don, Russia.

From 1991 Raffles worked, with Evelyn Gillan and a small team of other women, to establish the charity Zero Tolerance, to raise awareness of male violence against women. She was responsible for creating the images used in the early campaigns which were launched to great acclaim in Edinburgh and were then taken up by local authorities across the UK and abroad.

At this time she was awarded funding as a Wingate Trust Scholar to undertake a documentary project, entitled Lot's Wife, working with immigrant Jewish women, from the former Soviet Union, who had been resettled in Israel. She visited Israel a number of times to carry out this project which investigated ideas of family, identity, and religion. In the autumn of 1994 she was completing the selection of images and editing interviews she had carried out with the Russian Jewish women.

== Death and legacy ==
Raffles died on 6 December 1994 as a result of complications after giving birth to twin daughters.

A retrospective exhibition of her work, Observing Women at Work, was held at the Glasgow School of Art from 4 March to 27 April 2017.

A major retrospective exhibition, featuring over 300 of Raffles' photographs, was held at the Baltic in Gateshead 11th May 2024 - 16th March 2025.

The Franki Raffles Archive - including photographic prints, catalogues, negatives, contact sheets, notebooks and other materials - is held at the University of St Andrews Library.

A cafe within the University of St Andrews Library is named in honor of her.
