= Student Robotics =

Robot-building competition

- Founded: 2006
- Founders: Robert Gilton, Stephen English
- Type: Educational Charity
- Registration no.: 1163168
- Purpose: Robotics, Engineering and Computer Science
- Location: Lytchett House, 13 Freeland Park, Wareham Road Lytchett Matravers, BH16 6FA, UK
- Region served: United Kingdom
- Services: Charitable services
- Method: Robotics Competition
- Key people: Diane Dowling (Trustee), David Massey (Trustee), Thomas Scarsbrook (Trustee)
- Website: studentrobotics.org

Student Robotics is a registered charity that runs an annual robotics competition for teams of 16 to 19 year-olds. The charity aims to foster a world where engineering and artificial intelligence is accessible to young people with a stated mission "to bring the excitement of engineering and the challenge of coding to young people through robotics". The competition is free to enter and teams are provided with all of the core electronics that they need to build a robot. To encourage creative and ingenious solutions to problems, constraints on design (other than overall size) are kept to a minimum, and the students can build and fashion their robots with any materials they choose; this results in a wide range of quirky, original robots. The robots must operate autonomously; once they are switched on to compete no interference from the team is allowed.

The organisation was founded at the University of Southampton in 2006 by Robert Gilton and Stephen English. Students at the University of Bristol and Grenoble INP joined the project in 2010. In 2016 the organisation became a registered charity.

== Student Robotics competition ==
The competition is designed, organised and managed by a team of volunteers ("Blueshirts"). Most volunteers have previously competed in an annual competition and many have gone on to study robotics, computer science or engineering at university. The competition takes place over a weekend in April/May. There are a series of league matches, spread over two half days, where each team competes against 3 other robots, to score points. On the afternoon of the second day, the points from the league table determine the rounds for the knockout stage, which eventually determines the winners of the competition.

Teams are introduced to the competition, and provided with their kit, at a "KickStart" event at the beginning of the academic year in October. Kickstart involves briefings on the competition challenge, and its rules, by Student Robotics volunteers. There is also a mini-game to introduce the teams to the kit. During the competition cycle, "Tech Days" held at various locations where teams are encouraged to work on their robot under the supervision of Student Robotics' Volunteers.

Historically the competition has been hosted on the Highfield Campus of the University of Southampton, however the 2014 and 2015 competitions were held at Newbury Racecourse Grandstand. Kickstart is also held on the Highfield Campus of the University of Southampton, but for the 2014 competition there were Kickstarts at the University of Bristol and Gresham's School, and for the 2015 competition there were Kickstarts at the University of Bristol, Facebook's office in London, and the Technical University of Munich. In 2017, two Kickstart events were held, at the University of Southampton and at the offices of Thread in London.

The competition rules mandate that the robots are autonomous, rather than remote controlled. The competitors may program their robot in Python via an IDE provided by Student Robotics. Student Robotics does not ban, nor support other methods than the IDE for programming their robots.

The competition is free to enter although schools have to make their own travel arrangements and provide the materials to build a chassis and fashion their robot. In some years a small budget has been given to schools.

== Robotics kit ==
Another group of volunteers (the Kit Team) develops and maintains a modular "robotics kit" that is provided to every team. The current revision of the kit uses a Raspberry Pi 4 as its central controller; previously both an Odroid U3 (2015 - 2022) and BeagleBoard have been used. Most competitors use the Python programming language and teams are given access to a software library to ease interaction with the kit. However, it is not a requirement that they use Python or the library.

The main contents of the kit are:

- A Power Board (Central control and power distribution)
- Raspberry Pi 4 2GB with a KCH HAT
- Two Motor Boards (Boards for controlling brushed DC motors)
- A Ruggeduino Board (General purpose digital I/O and analogue input)
- A Servo Board (Board for controlling up to twelve servos)
- A USB Webcam
- Two 11.1V 2200mAh Lithium Polymer batteries

The software library includes a vision system based on OpenCV, although previously a system called libkoki was specifically developed for the competition. This allows for markers, placed in the arena, on other robots and on game objects/obstacles, to be seen by the robot. These provide information such as distance, position and rotation.

As the competition is free to enter, Student Robotics requires that the kit is returned post-competition.

== Competitions ==
=== 2027: Cancelled ===
The competition was cancelled due to budgetary constraints.

Currently, PSC Robotics is hosting a competition, to run as a replacement.

=== 2025: "Urban Heights" ===
The competition that was held at the University of Southampton on 12 and 13 April 2025.

	Team
First Place	The Highfield School
Second Place	St Helen & St Katharine School
Third Place	Ruthin School
Excellence in Engineering Award	Queen Mary's College
Rookie Award	The Highfield School
Robot and Team Image Award	St Helen & St Katharine School
Online Presence	St Helen & St Katharine School
First to Complete Challenges	Royal Grammar School, Guildford

Details on the 2025 competition and awards can be found in the 2025 rulebook and 2025 challenges document

=== 2024: "Final Frontier" ===
The competition that was held at the University of Southampton on 13 and 14 April 2024.

	Team
First Place	"MAI" - Gymnasium Markt Indersdorf, Germany
Second Place	Wisbech Grammar School
Third Place	The Ladies' College Guernsey
Excellence in Engineering Award	Abingdon School
Rookie Award	The Henry Box School
Robot and Team Image Award	"MAI" - Gymnasium Markt Indersdorf, Germany
Online Presence	Westminster City School
Challenges Award	Royal Grammar School, Guildford

Details on the 2024 competition and awards can be found in the 2024 rulebook

=== 2023: "Greed" ===
The competition that was held at the University of Southampton on 1 and 2 April 2023.

	Team
First Place	Haberdashers’ School
Second Place	Abingdon School
Third Place	"MAI" - Gymnasium Markt Indersdorf, Germany
Committee Award	Queen Mary's College
Rookie Award	Sherborne School
Robot and Team Image Award	Haberdashers’ School
Online Presence	Hampton School and Lady Eleanor Holles School
Challenges Award	Queen Mary's College

Details on the 2023 competition and awards can be found in the 2023 rulebook

=== 2022: "This Way Up" ===
This task involved moving and stacking cans of food in an arena, and marks the return of Student Robotics to an in-person competition following the COVID-19 pandemic.

This competition year also marked a transition to Python 3 on the physical kit, and a new computer vision system based on OpenCV.

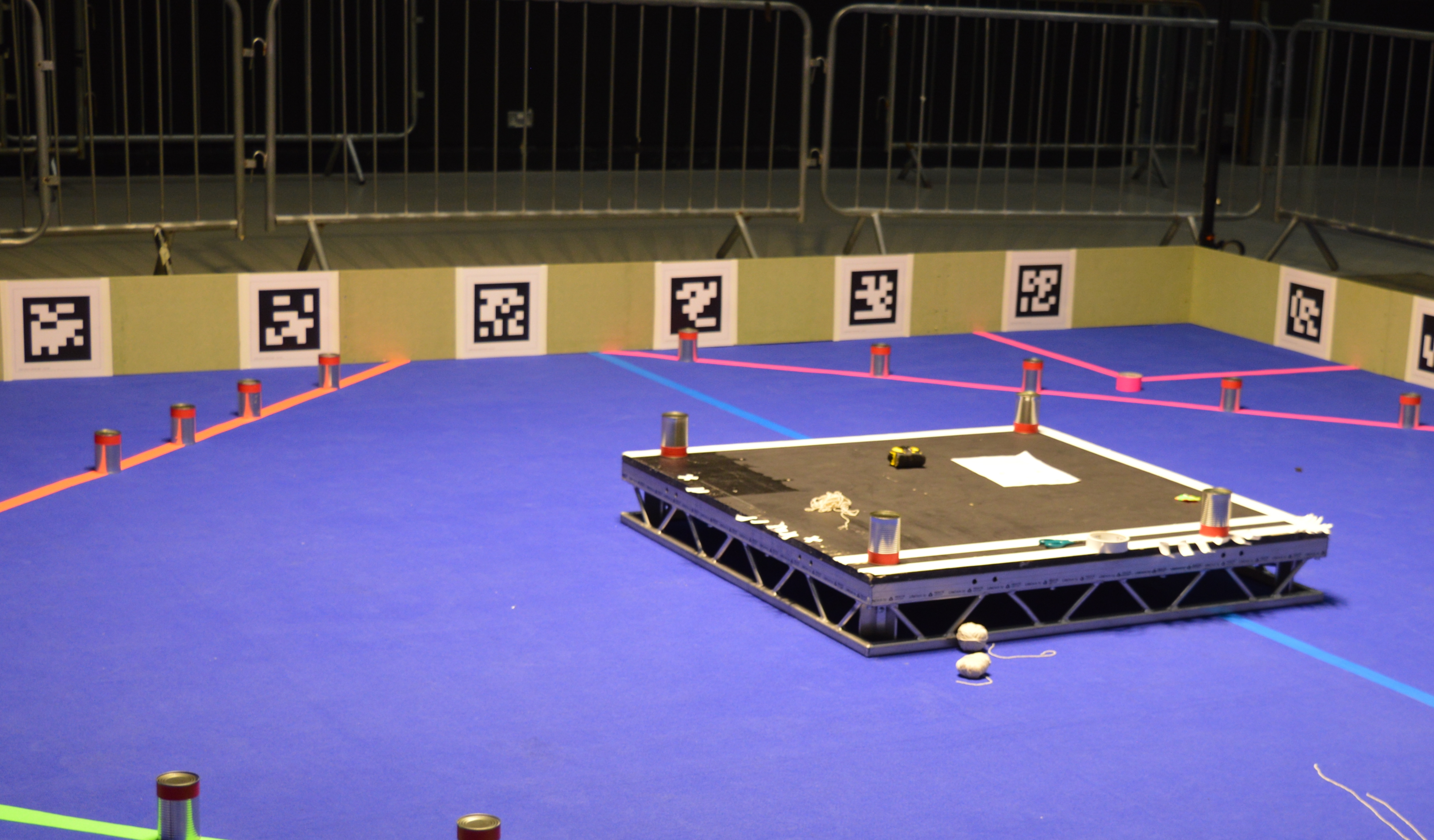
Arena for "This Way Up" in "The Cube"

23 teams attended the competition that was held at the University of Southampton on 23 and 24 April 2022. Notably, the competition had two arenas, one for testing only and one for matches. The arenas were also smaller than previous years at 6.5m x 6.5m, compared to the previous 8m x 8m.

	Team
First Place	Hills Road Sixth Form College
Second Place	Queen Mary's College
Third Place	Brockenhurst College
Rookie Award	Abingdon School
Committee Award	Queen Mary's College
Robot and Team Image	Hills Road Sixth Form College
Online Presence	Hampton School and Lady Eleanor Holles School

=== 2021: "Radars of the Lost Ark" ===
This task involved using virtual radios to navigate an arena and "claim" a number of towers. The 2021 competition was held remotely using the same simulator framework that was used for the 2020 competition, which allowed for this novel navigation system in addition to a number of more traditional sensor components.

Due to the remote nature of the competition, the usual structure of having a weekend with all matches on was replaced with four game "modules". League sessions were held over a number of weeks, with a new module and therefore additional complexity introduced into the game after each league session.

	Team
First Place	St Paul's College
Second Place	Yayasan Sultan Haji Hassanal Bolkiah
Third Place	The Malay College Kuala Kangsar
Rookie Award	We Robot
Committee Award	Hills Road Sixth Form College Team 2
Online Presence	Yayasan Sultan Haji Hassanal Bolkiah

=== 2020: "Two Colours" ===
This task involved gathering cardboard boxes (tokens) of exactly one colour. Both Gold and Silver tokens were placed in the arena. A central raised platform was placed at the centre of the arena to act as an obstacle.

The competition was due to be held at Reading University Students Union on 18 and 19 April, but was delayed, and then eventually cancelled due to the COVID-19 pandemic.

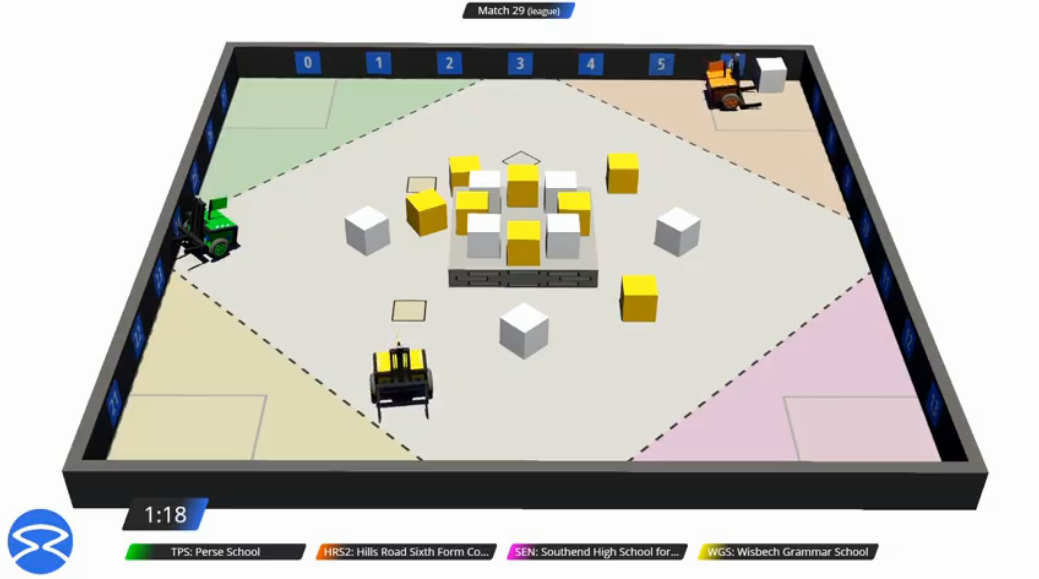
The virtual arena from the Student Robotics 2020 Live-stream

A virtual competition was held instead of the physical competition across three weekends in July 2020. A simulated environment based on Webots was developed and distributed to teams. Teams were instructed to submit code at the start of each competition day, so that matches could be pre-recorded, and then live-streamed over YouTube.

This final resulted in a 4-way tie so a tiebreaker match was held, the first since 2013.

	Team
First Place	JAMDynamics
Second Place	Kenilworth Sixth Form
Third Place	Lawrence Sheriff School
Rookie Award	Kenilworth Sixth Form
Committee Award	South Wilts Grammar School
Online Presence	"MAI" - Gymnasium Markt Indersdorf, Germany

The Robot and Team Image award was not issued this year. This year also marked the first year to use Python 3 for student code, albeit only for the competition simulator.

=== 2019: "Caldera" ===
This task involved moving cardboard boxes (tokens) around the arena in order to capture zones. A central "volcano" was placed at the centre of the arena to act as an obstacle; zones on the volcano were worth more points.

37 teams attended the competition that was held at the University of Southampton on 6 and 7 April 2019.

	Team
First Place	The Ladies' College Guernsey
Second Place	Hills Road Sixth Form College
Third Place	Hampton School and Lady Eleanor Holles School
Rookie Award	Eltham College
Committee Award	South Wilts Grammar School
Robot and Team Image	Haberdashers' Aske's Boys' School
Online Presence	The College of Richard Collyer

=== 2018: No Competition Held ===
There was no Student Robotics competition in 2018. Due to some organisational issues within the charity, it was decided to take a year off to reorganise and ensure the longevity of the charity.

Two alternate competitions were held with very similar characteristics and involved many of the original volunteers.

- SourceBots - A ten team competition was held at the University of Southampton on 21 and 22 April.
- Hills Road Robocon - A twelve team competition was held at Hills Road Sixth Form College.

=== 2017: "Easy as ABC" ===
The task involved picking up cardboard cubes labelled A, B or C, and placing them in the team's allocated zone, scoring additional points by collecting cubes in the order ABC.

The competition was held on 31 March to 1 April 2017 at The Racecourse, Newbury.

Prize	Team
First Place	CATS College Cambridge
Second Place	Hills Road Sixth Form College
Third Place	The College of Richard Collyer
Rookie Award	Dr Challoner's Grammar School
Committee Award	Lawrence Sheriff School
Robot and Team Image	Hills Road Sixth Form College
Online Presence	"MAI" - Gymnasium Markt Indersdorf, Germany

Details on the 2017 competition and awards can be found in the 2017 rulebook

=== 2016: "Sunny side Up" ===
The task involved rotating cardboard cubes to the colour of the respective teams, and scoring additional points by picking up the cubes and placing them in the corners.

The competition was held on 30 April to 1 May 2016 at The Racecourse, Newbury.

Prize	Team
First Place	Royal Grammar School, Guildford
Second Place	The Ladies' College
Third Place	Gordano School
Rookie Award	The Ladies' College
Committee Award	Tunbridge Wells Grammar School for Boys
Robot and Team Image	"MAI" - Gymnasium Markt Indersdorf, Germany
Online Presence	Queen Mary's College

Details on the 2016 competition and awards can be found in the 2016 rulebook

=== 2015: "Capture the Flag" ===
The task involved "capturing" small wooden cubes ("Flags") from their starting positions by moving them into the team's scoring area.

The competition was held on 25–26 April 2015 at The Racecourse, Newbury.

Prize	Team
First Place	Bishop Wordsworth's School
Second Place	Gordano School (team 2)
Third Place	King Edward VI Grammar School
Rookie Award	King Edward VI Grammar School
Committee Award	Cranbrook School
Robot and Team Image	"MAI" - Gymnasium Markt Indersdorf, Germany
Online Presence	Peter Symonds College
First Robot Movement	CATS College Cambridge

Details on the 2015 competition and awards can be found in the https://studentrobotics.org/docs/rules/archive#2015 2015 rulebook]

=== 2014: "Slots" ===
The task involved moving 20 cm^{3} cubes from their start positions into slots in the centre on the arena. Points were awarded for occupying slots. Another main factor was that the tokens could be flipped 180 degrees in order to score extra points.

The competition was held on 26–27 April 2014 at The Racecourse, Newbury.

Prize	Team
First Place	Headington School, Oxford
Second Place	Gordano School
Third Place	Clifton High School, Runshaw College
Rookie Award	Torquay Boys' Grammar School
Committee Award	"MAI (senior)" - Gymnasium Markt Indersdorf, Germany
Robot and Team Image	Hills Road Sixth Form College
Online Presence	Peter Symonds College
First Robot Movement	Torquay Boys' Grammar School

Details on the 2014 competition and awards can be found in the 2014 rulebook

=== 2013: "A Strange game" ===
The task involved moving large tokens into squares situated on the floor to take ownership of that square. The zone was owned by the team which had the most tokens in it. Points are awarded dependent of how many squares are owned by a team. In each zone there is a "pedestal" which if a robot gets to put their token on, they own that zone no matter on the number of other tokens in the square. Multipliers are awarded for getting zones in a row or column.

The 2013 competition final ended in a three-way tie, so a tie-breaker round was played.

This tie breaker has been said to be the most tense match in Student Robotics history as it was won 3 seconds before the end. The video of this can be found here.

Prize	Team
First Place	"MAI" - Gymnasium Markt Indersdorf, Germany
Second Place	"CLF" - Clifton High School
Third Place	Queen Mary's College (QMC)
Rookie Award	Headington School, Oxford (HSO2)
Committee Award	"Grey Matter Robotics"
Robot and Team Image	"Team Sky Crane" - Peter Symonds College, Winchester
Online Presence	"Grey Matter Robotics"
First Robot Movement	Headington School, Oxford (HSO1 & HSO2)

Details on the competition and awards can be found in the 2013 rulebook.

=== 2012: "Pirate plunder" ===
The task involved robots having to collect randomly located tokens from the arena, and depositing it in their zone of the arena. Bonus points were added for any token that was placed into a bucket in that zone.

This was the first year that used the latest vision system: libkoki.

The winners of the 2012 Competition were:

Prize	Team
First Place	"The Hitchhikers" - Peter Symonds College, Winchester
Second Place	"Systemetric" - Hills Road Sixth Form College, Cambridge
Third Place	Brockenhurst College, Brockenhurst
Committee Award	Queen Mary's College, Basingstoke
Outstanding Team	"Aslan" - Peter Symonds College, Winchester
Online Presence	MFG Robotics - Mirfield Free Grammar, Huddersfield
First Robot Movement	"MFG Robotics" - Mirfield Free Grammar, Huddersfield

Details on the awards can be found in the 2012 Rulebook

=== 2011: "Tin can rally" ===
The task was to go around the arena, gaining points for each corner passed. Multipliers were applied to the points gained related to the number of baked bean tins that the robot had picked up en route.

This was the first year that used the latest revision of kit.

The winners of the 2011 Competition were:

Prize	Team
First Place	Tauntons College, Southampton
Second Place	Peter Symonds College, Winchester
Third Place	Mirfield Free Grammar, Huddersfield
Chairmans Award	Mirfield Free Grammar, Huddersfield
Online Presence	"Powered By Magic" - Churcher's College, Petersfield
First Robot Movement	Queen Elizabeth's Hospital School, Bristol

Details on the awards can be found in the 2011 Rulebook

=== 2010: "QuacMan" ===
The challenge involved picking up small wooden tokens of the correct colour, with points being lost for picking up the wrong colour blocks. In addition, a super token (a rubber duck, from which the game's name was derived) was placed on top of a ramp in the centre of the arena, which was worth enough points alone to swing the match.

=== 2009: "Golf" and "Squirrel" ===
In 2009, two game types were specified, both involved collection & placement of coloured play-balls. Teams had a home zone on the floor of the arena, as well as a net suspended above their corner, into which the balls could be placed.

In Golf, teams had to place the balls into their opponents' zones & nets, while in Squirrel the challenge was reversed, with teams aiming to collect the balls.

=== 2008 ===
The first game was not named, and involved teams collecting coloured tokens that were painted wooden cubes.
