= King Edward VI Grammar School, Chelmsford =

King Edward VI Grammar School
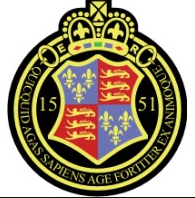

Location
- Broomfield Road; Chelmsford, Essex, CM1 3SX; England; 51.74°N 0.465°E

Information
- Type: Grammar school, Academy
- Motto: Quicquid agas sapiens age fortiter ex animoque ('Whatsoever thy hand findeth to do, do it with thy might', Ecc 9:10)
- Established: 1551; 475 years ago
- Founder: Edward VI
- Department for Education URN: 136642 Tables
- Ofsted: Reports
- Chairman: Adam Smith
- Headteacher: Natalie Wilson
- Staff: 74 teaching, 62 support
- Gender: Boys; Mixed (Sixth Form)
- Age: 11 to 18
- Enrolment: Over 1000
- Houses: Holland; Mildmay; Strutt; Tindal
- Publication: The Chelmsfordian
- Former pupils: Old Chelmsfordians
- Website: www.kegs.org.uk

King Edward VI Grammar School, or KEGS, is an English grammar school with academy status located in the city of Chelmsford, Essex. It takes pupils between the ages of 11 and 18 (school years 7 to 13). For years 7 to 11 the school is boys-only, but it is mixed in the sixth form (years 12 and 13). The current headteacher is Natalie Wilson. In 2026 the Daily Telegraph named it the best state secondary school in England.

== History of the school ==
Coat of Arms of Edward VI, the escutcheon of which is also that of the school: Quarterly: I and IV azure, three fleurs-de-lis Or; II and III gules, three lions passant guardant in pale Or armed and langued azure.

KEGS was one of many grammar schools founded by Edward VI. Its current form resulted from a royal warrant dated 24 March 1551, although evidence of this school exists from as far back as the 13th century, possibly earlier, as a chantry school in a different location in Chelmsford. Indeed, the school of 1551 was merely a "rebranding" of the Chelmsford Chantry School, a Roman Catholic institution which had been abolished along with the monasteries during the English Reformation. The school was moved to its present site on Broomfield Road in 1892. Once a boarding school, it was one of many grammar schools to join the state sector and abolish the nominal fees. The last boarding students left in the 1970s. In 1976 it admitted its first female pupil to the sixth form.

The school has been ranked in the top 50 schools in the country in national examination league tables. KEGS was previously a Foundation School and Specialist Science College and Language College. The school converted to academy status in April 2011, but continues to have science and languages as specialisms. It is also a Leading Edge school.

In 1981 it was named by The Sunday Times as the most successful state school as measured by Oxbridge open awards. In 1998, it was rated by the Financial Times as the most successful state school at GCE advanced level in the period 1993–1998. In 2001 the school was named Sunday Times School of the Year. The 2015 Good Schools Guide names KEGS as the top selective state school for a number of A-level subjects, as well as GCSE History and FSMQ Additional Mathematics. In December 2021, it was judged to be "outstanding" by OFSTED.

In 2025 it was ranked 9^{th} out of all schools in England by The Sunday Times as well as the 2025 East Anglia State Secondary School of the Year. In 2026 the Daily Telegraph named it the best state secondary school in England, achieving full marks in all of its categories.

== House system ==
In 1907, headmaster Frank Rogers set up the system of "Houses" – Holland, named after the translator Philemon Holland; Mildmay, after the courtier and politician Sir Walter Mildmay; Strutt, after the antiquary Joseph Strutt; and Tindal, after the lawyer Sir Nicholas Conyngham Tindal, and dividing the school into four forms in each year. However, due to the expansion of the school roll, there are currently five forms in each year, up to year 10, in which the pupils are rearranged into 6 forms of 25 students each to enhance teaching for core subjects.

== Extracurricular activities ==
=== Combined Cadet Force and Corps of Drums ===
The school maintains an Army contingent of the Combined Cadet Force (CCF), which was also open to students of Chelmsford County High School for Girls until 2017. Military music is provided within the contingent by a Corps of Drums playing drums, flutes and bugles. The Corps wears the full dress scarlet tunics of The Essex Regiment, incorporating the purple facings which gave the Essex Regiment its nickname 'The Pompadours'. It carries the drums of the 5th Battalion (Territorial Army) emblazoned with the Regiment's battle honours.

=== KEGS Music ===
The school has many ensembles, of which the orchestras include members from other schools, though the majority are from KEGS and Chelmsford County High School for Girls. The other ensembles are exclusive to those who attend KEGS.

- Junior Orchestra
- Senior Orchestra
- Choir
- Wind Band
- Jazz Ensemble
- Big Band

=== The KEGS Ambassador ===
The KEGS Ambassador is the school's independent student newspaper. Since its creation in January 2009, it has published articles by alumni, staff and students.

=== KEGS Young Engineers ===
The KEGS Young Engineers team won the 2022 PAPI Raspberry Pi Competition in the years 12–13 division, as well as the People's Choice Award and has made it to the final every year since the competition started.

The team competes in the FIRST Lego League Challenge, sending two year 8 and 9 teams every year, having gone to the finals numerous times, as well as a year 12 team annually to the Student Robotics competition where they have reached the quarter-finals multiple times.

=== KEGS Languages Society ===
The KEGS Languages Society (LangSoc) is a group where both concepts in linguistics and the structure of specific languages are discussed, mostly in short presentations.

LangSoc also provides training for the United Kingdom Linguistics Olympiad (UKLO). A student won a gold medal in the International Linguistics Olympiad (IOL) in 2022.

=== KEGS Medicine Society ===
The KEGS Medicine Society (MedSoc) is a society where topical medical issues are discussed.

=== KEGS Computing Society ===
The KEGS Computing Society (CompSoc) is a student-led society in which students present on computer science topics including graphics rendering, cyber security, computational algorithms, different aspects of programming languages and quantum computing.

== Notable former pupils ==
=== Of the Chelmsford Chantry School (before the Royal Charter of 1551) ===
- John Dee, mathematician, astronomer, astrologer, geographer, occultist, and consultant to Queen Elizabeth I; responsible for the English translation of Euclid's work.

=== Pre-1900 ===
- John Hilton (surgeon), professor of human anatomy and surgery at the Royal College of Surgeons, president of the Hunterian Society
- Philemon Holland, classical scholar
- Joseph Strutt, author of "Sports and Pastimes of the People of England"
- Nicholas Conyngham Tindal, Lord Chief Justice of The Court of Common Pleas

=== 1900–1960 ===
- Claude Colleer Abbott, poet and academic
- H. H. Abbott, poet and headmaster
- John Baker, Downing Professor of the Laws of England at the University of Cambridge and leading legal historian
- J. A. Baker, author of The Peregrine and The Hill of Summer
- Norman Fowler, former Lord Speaker; Conservative politician; former Cabinet minister
- Peter Joslin, Chief Constable of Warwickshire Police (1983–1998)
- Ron Loveday, Labor minister in South Australia
- Tony Oliver (referee), English Football League referee
- Brian Parkyn, Labour MP for Bedford from 1966 to 1970
- Peter Seabrook, gardener and broadcaster
- John G. Taylor, professor of Mathematics at King's College London from 1971 to 1996, and President of the European Neural Network Society from 1993 to 1994
- John Urquhart, cricketer
- Paul White, Baron Hanningfield, politician and member of the House of Lords
- Denis Wick, trombonist
- Clive Young, former Bishop of Dunwich

=== Post-1960 ===
- Nick Alston, Essex's first Police and Crime Commissioner
- Nick Bourne, Conservative politician
- Lewis Brindley, co-founder of the Yogscast
- Neil Cole, comedian, television presenter and radio broadcaster
- Mervyn Day, former FA Cup winning professional footballer and former assistant manager of West Ham United Football Club
- Alex Dowsett, British cyclist
- Guthrie Govan, guitarist and guitar teacher, named "Guitarist of the Year" by Guitarist magazine in 1993
- Jason Hazeley, comedy writer
- Simon Heffer, British journalist and writer for The Daily Telegraph and The Daily Mail
- Thomas Jenkinson, electronic and jazz musician, also known as Squarepusher
- Matt Lodder, art historian.
- Jon Lewis, former Essex and Durham cricketer
- Anthony Marwood, concert violinist
- James Maynard, Mathematician and Fields Medal winner
- Tim Mead, countertenor
- Anthony Milton, Commandant General Royal Marines and Commander UK Amphibious Forces from 2002 to 2004
- Joel Morris, comedy writer
- Grayson Perry, 2003 Turner Prize winner
- Mike Smith, touring car driver and television presenter
- Joe Thomas, actor, writer and comedian
- John Tipler, international motoring journalist
- Oliver Bearman, British Motorsport Racer for Haas F1 Team in Formula 1
- Brin Pirathapan, Winner of BBC MasterChef 2024

=== Fictional ===
- John Watson, character in the 2010 BBC series of Sherlock. John Watson's CV is visible in episode two, where KEGS is cited under Education Qualifications (with 6 A*).
