= UCAS Tariff =

British university and college admissions metric

The UCAS Tariff (formerly called UCAS Points System) is used to allocate points to post-16 qualifications (Level 3 qualifications on the Regulated Qualifications Framework). Universities and colleges may use it when making offers to applicants. A points total is achieved by converting qualifications, such as A-Levels, Scottish Highers and BTECs, into points, making it simpler for course providers to compare applicants. It is used as a means of giving students from the United Kingdom places at UK universities.

While UCAS Tariff Points are often based on qualifications earned through formal education, they can also be increased through other means, including taking extra-curricular activities, such as doing an EPQ or passing a Grade 6 in an instrument. Though this must remain cautionary as many universities will still have other entry requirements or expectations that they have for a student that may not be met with additional UCAS Points.

Common ways for UCAS points to be calculated are through the UCAS Tariff Calculator, official tariff tables, or through third-party software and websites.

The UCAS Tariff was first introduced in 2001. Since then, however, both the range of qualifications held by applicants, and the variety of progression routes into higher education have increased. Therefore a new Tariff was introduced. The new UCAS Tariff points are based on a different methodology. The change to new UCAS Tariff will not in itself change entry requirements for university or college courses. Universities and colleges are independent organisations and each year they decide how to set their entry requirements. Those universities and colleges that use UCAS Tariff points to express their entry requirements will simply set their requirements using the new number system.

== Points system ==
The following qualifications can count towards the tariff:

=== GCE qualifications ===
==== New tariff ====
- GCE A Levels

A level UCAS points table (New Tariff)
Grade	UCAS Points
A*	56
A	48
B	40
C	32
D	24
E	16

- GCE AS Levels

AS level UCAS points table
Grade	UCAS points
A	20
B	16
C	12
D	10
E	6

- GCE A Level (Double Award)

A level (Double Award) UCAS points table
Grade	UCAS points
A*A*	112
A*A	104
AA	96
AB	88
BB	80
BC	72
CC	64
CD	56
DD	48
DE	40
EE	32

- GCE AS Level (Double Award)

AS level (Double Award) UCAS points table
Grade	UCAS points
AA	40
AB	36
BB	32
BC	28
CC	24
CD	22
DD	20
DE	16
EE	12

- GCE A Level with additional AS Level

These are only offered by AQA and Edexcel.

A Level with additional AS Level UCAS points table
Grade	UCAS points
A*A*	80
A*A	76
AA	68
AB	64
BB	56
BC	52
CC	44
CD	42
DD	34
DE	30
EE	22

==== Original 2001 UCAS Points Tariff ====
UCAS initially introduced a university points tariff which created a points system to cover the GCE A-Level and AS-Level qualification for students starting higher education in September 2001. (GCE A and AS Levels awarded before 2001 do not attract UCAS points).

A level UCAS points table (Original 2001 Tariff)
Grade	UCAS Points
A	10
B	8
C	6
D	4
E	2

AS level UCAS points table (Original 2001 Tariff)
Grade	UCAS points
A	5
B	4
C	3
D	2
E	1

==== Old Tariff (2002-2016) ====
UCAS revamped the original tariff to a single points system which included the majority of post-16 academic qualifications (including the allocation of points to Advanced GNVQS and Key Skills). This change applied to students starting courses in 2002. Additional post-16 qualifications were allocated points after this date.

A level UCAS points table (Old Tariff)
Grade	UCAS Points
A*	140
A	120
B	100
C	80
D	60
E	40

Grade	UCAS points
A	60
B	50
C	40
D	30
E	20

=== International Baccalaureate ===
- Higher Level subjects:

IBO Certificate in Higher Level UCAS points table
Grade	UCAS Points
H7	56
H6	48
H5	32
H4	24
H3	12
H2	0
H1	0

- Standard Level subjects:

IBO Certificate in Standard Level UCAS points table
Grade	UCAS Points
S7	28
S6	24
S5	16
S4	12
S3	6
S2	0
S1	0

- Theory of Knowledge and Extended Essay bonus points:

IBO Certificate in Theory of Knowledge/Extended Essay UCAS points table
Grade	UCAS Points
A	12
B	10
C	8
D	6
E	4

Full Diploma or each of its components.

=== BTECs ===
- National Award

BTEC National Award Points table
Grade	UCAS points
D*	56
D	48
M	32
P	16

- National Certificate

BTEC National Certificate Points table
Grade	UCAS points
DD	96
DM	80
MM	64
MP	48
PP	32

- National Diploma

BTEC National Certificate Points table
Grade	UCAS points
DDD	144
DDM	128
DMM	112
MMM	96
MMP	80
MPP	64
PPP	48

- BTEC Nationals in Children’s Play, Learning and Development (NQF)
  - Ranging from 32 (Double Pass) to 112 (Double Distinction*)
- BTEC National Certificate in Children’s Play, Learning and Development
  - Ranging from 48 (Triple Pass) to 168 (Triple Distinction*)
- BTEC National Award in Children’s Play, Learning and Development
  - Ranging from 16 (Pass) to 56 (Distinction*)

=== T Levels ===
T Levels UCAS points table
Grade	UCAS points
Distinction*	168
Distinction	144
Merit	120
Pass (C or above)	96
Pass (D or E)	72

=== Extended Project Qualification (EPQ) ===
EPQ UCAS points table
Grade	UCAS points
A*	28
A	24
B	20
C	16
D	12
E	8

=== Scottish Qualifications Authority Qualifications ===
- SQC Nationals Advanced Highers:

Advanced Highers UCAS points table
Grade	UCAS Points
A	56
B	48
C	40
D	32

- SQC Nationals Higher:

Highers UCAS points table
Grade	UCAS points
A	33
B	27
C	21
D	15

=== Advanced Placement exams ===
Advanced Placement UCAS points table
Grade	UCAS Points
5	28
4	24
3	20
2	16
1	12

=== Irish Leaving Certificate ===
- Higher Level:

Irish Leaving Certificate Higher Level UCAS points table
Grade	UCAS Points
H1	36
H2	30
H3	24
H4	18
H5	12
H6	9

- Ordinary Level:

Irish Leaving Certificate Ordinary Level UCAS points table
Grade	UCAS Points
O1	12
O2	10
O3	8
O4	6

=== Music exams ===
These are only counted if at grade 6 or above.

- Theory

Theory of Music UCAS points table
Level and Grade	UCAS points
Grade 6 Pass	4
Grade 6 Merit	5
Grade 6 Distinction	6
Grade 7 Pass	6
Grade 7 Merit	7
Grade 7 Distinction	8
Grade 8 Pass	8
Grade 8 Merit	9
Grade 8 Distinction	10

- Practical

Music Practical UCAS points table
Level and Grade	UCAS points
Grade 6 Pass	8
Grade 6 Merit	10
Grade 6 Distinction	12
Grade 7 Pass	12
Grade 7 Merit	14
Grade 7 Distinction	16
Grade 8 Pass	18
Grade 8 Merit	24
Grade 8 Distinction	30

=== Speech & Drama exams ===
These are only counted if at grade 1 or above.

- Ranging from 8 points (Grade 1 Pass) to 30 (Grade 8 Distinction)
- Individuals who complete the LAMDA Certificate in Performance Studies with merit or distinction can earn more points than are available for graded exams (8 for a pass, 16 for merit, 24 for distinction)

=== Others ===
- The Welsh Baccalaureate is worth from 16 (Grade E) to 56 points (Grade A*).
- An Advanced Extension Award can either be worth 12 for a Merit or 14 for a Distinction (this is on top of the A level tariff)
- Foundation Art and Design ranges from 80 for a pass to 112 for a Distinction.
- Free-standing Mathematics Qualifications points range from 3 points for a grade E up to 10 points for a grade A.
- ASDAN Certificate of Personal Effectiveness CoPE, offers 16 points.

== See also ==
- UCAS
