= Kristina Murrin =

Australian government official

Kristina Murrin CBE, née Hunt, is an Australian-born United Kingdom-based innovator and former policy advisor to both the Blair and Cameron governments. Between 2010 and 2013 she jointly led the twelve-person policy and implementation team at No. 10 Downing Street.

== Early life and education ==
Murrin was born in Sydney, Australia, but moved to the UK when she was 12. Her father, John Hunt, was Emeritus Professor of Organisational Behaviour at the London Business School. Her sister is Jay Hunt, head of Apple TV Europe.

Murrin was educated at the independent Lady Eleanor Holles School in Hampton, West London, followed by St John's College at the University of Cambridge, where she read Social and Political Sciences.

== Career ==
Murrin started her career as a trainee at Procter and Gamble, before ending up as Brand Manager for household names such as Old Spice and Crest. In 2002, she left to become one of the early partners in the global innovation business, What If, which was eventually acquired by Accenture.

Between 2001-2006, Murrin served as an associate of Tony Blair's Prime Minister’s Delivery Unit.

In 2007 she was appointed as non-executive Director of the newly formed UK Government's Department for Universities, Innovation, and Skills.

In 2010, Murrin was appointed as Director of Implementation at No10 Downing Street, a new post created to monitor departmental business plans, and to track and report on their progress, to the Prime Minister. Radically, Murrin chose to publish monthly reports stating which departments and ministers were on track with major policy implementations, and which were falling behind. It was a position which she held through a period of structural change, until leaving in January 2013.

Murrin has served as a fellow of the Institute for government in London and as a Fellow at the Blavatnik School of Government Oxford University. In 2017 she led a Government review into Innovation in the Ministry of Defence

In 2018 she was asked to establish a new National Leadership Centre by Chancellor Phillip Hammond and acted as CEO from 2018-2020.

She was CEO of The Royal Anniversary Trust and has served as CEO of The King's Foundation since July 2023.

Murrin was appointed Commander of the Order of the British Empire (CBE) in the 2014 New Year Honours for services to the Prime Minister's Office.

== Books ==
Alongside her corporate and governmental career, Murrin has also authored four books:

- How to Start a Creative Revolution
- What Worries Parents
- Healthy Happy Children
- Honey, We're Killing the Kids

Honey, We're Killing the Kids was also turned into a BBC TV programme, which Murrin hosted for three series. She also presented the Channel 4 environmental programme, The Woman Who Stops Traffic.

== Personal ==
She is married and has three children. She lives in London.
