= ASDAN =

British educational organization

- Purpose: Educational
- Location(s): Bristol, United Kingdom
- Chief Executive: Melissa Farnham

ASDAN (Award Scheme Development and Accreditation Network) is a UK education charity and awarding organisation based in Bristol. It develops and accredits programmes and qualifications aimed at supporting learners in developing personal, social, and employability skills. Its work focuses particularly on those who face barriers to learning in traditional educational settings.

== History ==
ASDAN was established in 1991 as a curriculum development project based at the University of the West of England. It became an independent educational charity in 1997. Its original aim was to provide opportunities for young people to develop skills for learning, work, and life through activity-based learning and assessment.

== Programmes and qualifications ==
ASDAN provides a variety of curriculum programmes and regulated qualifications as an Ofqual-accredited awarding body. In 2024, more than 42,000 learners across the UK and in 30 other countries completed one of its programmes, while more than 7,500 students received certified qualifications.

Its programmes include the Personal Development Programmes, Preparing for Adulthood programmes, Moving On, Lifeskills Challenge, and Short Courses intended to be flexible and adaptable to different educational contexts, including mainstream schools, special education settings, and alternative provision.

The organisation's regulated qualifications ranging from Entry Level 1 to Level 3, include the Certificate of Personal Effectiveness (CoPE), Employability, Personal and Social Development (PSD), Personal Progress and the Extended Project Qualification (EPQ). ASDAN's Level 3 qualifications come with UCAS tariff points and are designed to support progression to further education or employment.

== Learner support and focus ==
ASDAN's courses are aimed at learners with diverse needs, including those who are:

- experiencing poverty in all its forms, whether economic, physical, mental, cultural, spiritual, political or societal
- without support for their emotional, social, special educational needs or disability
- not engaged or succeeding in their education and who miss an English and/or Maths pass at 16 or subsequently;
- at risk of becoming NEET (Not in Education, Employment or Training)

== Governance ==
The Chief Executive of ASDAN is Melissa Farnham.

The Chair of Trustees is Brian Doidge.

In January 2015, The Rt Hon the Lord Knight of Weymouth, Jim Knight, became a Patron of ASDAN.

== Membership and training ==
Educational institutions can become ASDAN members, gaining access to teaching resources, training opportunities, and support networks for delivering ASDAN programmes and qualifications.
