= David Williams (space administrator) =

David Frederick Williams (born 21 September 1951) is a former chief executive of the UK Space Agency.

== Early life ==
He went to the Hutton Grammar School on Liverpool Road in Hutton, Preston, Lancashire. From the University of Reading he gained a BSc in 1974 and a PhD in 1978.

== Career ==
He worked for the Natural Environment Research Council (NERC) from 1982 to 1989. From 1989, he worked for the British National Space Centre (BNSC). He became director general of the BNSC on 1 May 2006.

He became acting chief executive, UK Space Agency and chairman of the European Space Agency (ESA) Council. On 23 March 2010, the new UK Space Agency was launched to replace the BNSC and to bring all UK civil space activities under one single management. He will steer the ESA Council as it prepares for the next meeting of ESA's Ministers in 2012.

On 3 August 2012, the Australian Commonwealth Scientific and Industrial Research Organisation (CSIRO) announced that Williams had been appointed to the role of CSIRO group executive, Information Sciences, based in Sydney, Australia.

== Personal life ==
In 1985 he married Jeannie Rickards. They have a son and two daughters.
