= John Urquhart (cricketer) =

English cricketer

Personal information
- Full name: John Rankin Urquhart
- Born: 29 May 1921; Chelmsford, Essex, England
- Died: 16 June 2003 (aged 82); Melbourne, Victoria, England
- Batting: Right-handed
- Bowling: Right-arm medium-fast

Domestic team information
- Years: Team
- 1948: Cambridge University

Career statistics
Competition	First-class
Matches	4
Runs scored	13
Batting average	3.25
100s/50s	–/–
Top score	6*
Balls bowled	634
Wickets	15
Bowling average	15.40
5 wickets in innings	–
10 wickets in match	–
Best bowling	4/21
Catches/stumpings	–/–
- Source: Cricinfo, 28 April 2021

John Rankin Urquhart (29 May 1921 – 16 June 2003) was an English first-class cricketer.

The son of John Cramond Urquhart, he was born at Chelmsford in May 1921. He was educated at King Edward VI Grammar School, Chelmsford. The Second World War began just as Urquhart was completing his studies at King Edward VI, with Urquhart being commissioned as a second lieutenant in the Essex Regiment in March 1941. Following the war, he went up to Emmanuel College, Cambridge. While studying at Cambridge, he played first-class cricket for Cambridge University Cricket Club in 1948, making four appearances. He was a late selection for The University Match at Lord's, having earned his place in the team following success against Gloucestershire, where alongside Trevor Bailey he helped to dismiss Gloucestershire for 123 in their first innings, with Urquhart taking match figures of 7 for 66. He pulled his back in the nets on the second morning of The University Match, rendering him unable to bowl in the match. In his four first-class matches, he took 15 wickets with his right-arm medium-fast bowling, with best figures of 4 for 21. After graduating from Cambridge, Urquhart worked in marketing for Cadbury for year in England, before emigrating to South Africa in 1949, where he worked for Cadbury. In 1957, he emigrated to Australia to work for the company in Melbourne. He died at Melbourne in June 2003.
