= Jay Hunt (television executive) =

Australian-born British television executive

Jay Hunt OBE
- Born: Jacqueline Leigh Hunt; 20 January 1967 (age 59); Sydney, Australia
- Education: Lady Eleanor Holles School
- Alma mater: St John's College, Cambridge
- Occupation: Television executive
- Title: Director of Programmes, Channel 5 (2007–2008); Controller of BBC One (2008–2010); Chief Creative Officer, Channel 4 (2011–2017); Creative Director, Worldwide Video, Europe, Apple Inc. (2017–present); Chair, British Film Institute (2024–present)
- Spouse: Ian Blandford (m. 2005)
- Children: 2
- Relatives: Kristina Murrin (sister); Simon Hunt (brother)

Jacqueline Leigh "Jay" Hunt OBE (born 20 January 1967) is an Australian-born British television executive working as creative director, worldwide video, Europe for Apple Inc. From early 2011 until June 2017, Hunt was the chief creative officer of Channel 4.

She has previously served as director of programmes at Channel 5, and as controller of BBC One. She is the only person to have led all three channels. Under her leadership, Channel 4 was named Channel of the Year at the 2014 Edinburgh International Television Festival and Broadcast magazine's Channel of the Year in 2016. In February 2024, Hunt became the chair of the British Film Institute.

== Early life ==
Hunt was born in Sydney, Australia, and lived in Pittsburgh and Crete before moving permanently to London aged 15. Hunt's father John was Emeritus Professor of Organisational Behaviour at the London Business School. Her sister is innovator and former government policy advisor Kristina Murrin. Her brother Simon Hunt served as CEO of William Grant & Sons from 2016 to 2020.

Hunt was educated at the independent Lady Eleanor Holles School in Hampton, West London, followed by St John's College, Cambridge, where she read English.

== Career ==
Hunt joined the BBC in 1989 as a researcher, working on the BBC's Breakfast News. She worked on Newsnight and Panorama, subsequently becoming editor of the BBC's One O'Clock News and, in 1999, the Six O'Clock News. She led outside broadcast teams to cover the handover of Hong Kong to China and the first multiracial elections in South Africa.

Hunt became BBC Birmingham's executive producer for daytime in 2002, being promoted to senior commissioning executive for daytime in 2003 and then controller of BBC daytime and early peak, with responsibility for programming across both BBC One and BBC Two between 9 am and 7 pm. In this role, she commissioned Great British Menu, Put Your Money Where Your Mouth Is, Heir Hunters and Missing.

Hunt left the BBC for eight months in 2007, to replace Dan Chambers as controller of programmes for Five, and hired Natasha Kaplinsky from the BBC shortly afterwards. At Five, she commissioned Cowboy Builders, Extreme Fishing with Robson Green, Police Interceptors, Breaking into Tesco and Britain's Best Home.

On 3 December 2007, it was announced that she would be returning to the BBC to take up the vacant post of controller of BBC One in early 2008, replacing the resigning Peter Fincham following criticism over the handling of A Year with the Queen. She worked her notice at Channel 5 until April 2008, before returning to the BBC. In 2009, Hunt was accused of a conflict of interest after it was revealed she was company secretary of a production company owned by her husband which had a contract with the BBC. The BBC said this did not breach their conflict of interest policy.

In 2008 and 2009, BBC One won MGEITF Terrestrial Channel of the Year. At BBC One, her commissions included Sherlock, Mrs Brown's Boys, Luther, Criminal Justice, Five Daughters, Bang Goes the Theory, The Day the Immigrants Left and Famous, Rich and Homeless. She also commissioned Michael McIntyre and John Bishop's first network programmes. She axed the long-running sitcom Last of the Summer Wine, which had had declining ratings in the last five years of its run.

In September 2010, Channel 4 announced Hunt's appointment to the new post of chief creative officer. Immediately placed on "gardening leave" from the BBC, she joined Channel 4 in January 2011. While on leave, Hunt was a witness at the employment tribunal of the sacked Countryfile presenter Miriam O'Reilly, who accused Hunt of ageism and sexism. In January 2011, the day after Hunt began working at Channel 4, O'Reilly's claims for age discrimination and victimisation were upheld, but the sexism claim was dismissed. As part of her strategy to improve the quality of Channel 4 News, from spring 2011 Hunt hired Matt Frei (Washington), Jackie Long (social affairs) and Michael Crick (political correspondent) from the BBC.

At Channel 4, Hunt's commissions included Humans, Catastrophe, Gogglebox, Indian Summers, Derry Girls, The Island, The Undateables, Hunted, Benefits Street, First Dates, Child Genius, SAS: Who Dares Wins, Naked Attraction and The Secret Life of 4 Year Olds. She led the team that delivered the BAFTA award-winning coverage of the 2012 London Paralympic Games, and in 2015 brought Formula One to Channel 4, with a new three-year deal for the sport.

Under her role, Channel 4 was named The Edinburgh TV Festival Channel of the Year in 2014 and 2016, and Broadcast Channel of the Year in 2016 – with the channel receiving industry awards including more BAFTA TV awards in 2014 and 2015, and more Royal Television Society Programme Awards than any other channel in 2014 and 2016. In 2015, Channel 4's audience share increased for the first time in nine years. In June 2015, Hunt told Campaign magazine the channel was enjoying "creative renewal", having "weaned ourselves off Big Brother".

In March 2016, Hunt delivered a Royal Television Society speech reflecting on her first five years at Channel 4 and the new creative culture she had established at the broadcaster. In February 2013, she was assessed as one of the 100 most powerful women in the United Kingdom by Woman's Hour on BBC Radio 4. Hunt resigned from Channel 4 at the beginning of June 2017, and was due to leave in September after serving her notice. She had been seen as the most likely candidate to succeed David Abraham as chief executive, and had been interviewed for the post.

Famously lost Channel 4 millions in revenue by rejecting and telling Avalon executive that the soon to be world wide phenomenon, Taskmaster, was the worst piece of telly she had ever seen. In 2020 Channel 4 rectified Hunt's mistake and purchased the rights to the show.

In October 2017, she was hired by Apple to lead commissioning for Apple TV+ in Europe. There, her commissions include Slow Horses, Bad Sisters, Prehistoric Planet and Trying.

In February 2020, she was appointed as governor of the British Film Institute. She became chair of the organisation in February 2024.

Hunt was appointed an Officer of the Order of the British Empire in the 2023 Birthday Honours for services to the arts.

In June 2023, she was tipped by proactiveinvestors.co.uk as a potential replacement for Carolyn McCall as chief executive of ITV plc.

== Personal life ==
In June 2005, Hunt married Ian Blandford, formerly with BBC News, who now runs Brightspark TV. The couple, who live in Clapham, south London, have a son and daughter.

Media offices
Preceded by Peter Fincham	Controller of BBC One; 2008-2010	Succeeded by Danny Cohen
