= Nazia Mogra =

Nazia Mogra is a British children's TV presenter and senior television journalist for BBC's Newsround and North West Tonight, on BBC One and BBC Sport.

== Life ==
Nazia grew up in Preston and attended Hutton Grammar School and Edge Hill University. She has presented films for BBC's Inside Out. She has also presented for BBC Sport and BBC World News. She was a trainer for freelance journalists at UCLAN and at the BBC.

In 2015 she joined children's news programme Newsround.

A film which she presented and co produced for CBBC was a BAFTA finalist. The film 'Anne Frank: A Life in Hiding' has received more than 1 million views online.

Currently Nazia sits on the BBC Board for Nations England, Northern Ireland, Scotland and Wales. She is also the Deputy Managing Editor for BBC News.
