= Claude Colleer Abbott =

English poet (1889–1971)

- Born: 17 April 1889; Broomfield, Essex, England
- Died: 17 September 1971 (aged 82)
- Occupation: Academic

Claude Colleer Abbott (17 April 1889 – 17 September 1971) was an English poet, scholar and university lecturer, the 'C. C. Abbott' of academic publications. He is principally known as the editor of Gerard Manley Hopkins' correspondence.

== Life and career ==
The son of a butcher and brother of the poet H. H. Abbott, Claude Colleer Abbott (who usually signed himself 'C. Colleer Abbott') was educated at King Edward VI Grammar School, Chelmsford, and the University of London (B.A. 1913, M.A. 1915). He taught at Sudbury Grammar School, and Middlesbrough High School, before being conscripted, after an appeal, late in the War, in 1918. He joined the Artists Rifles O.T.C. and then served in the Irish Guards Special Reserve as second lieutenant. After the War he studied at Gonville and Caius College, Cambridge (B.A. 1921, Ph.D. 1926), then lectured in English Language and Literature at the University of Aberdeen (1921–1932) and at Durham University (1932–1954), where he became Professor of English.

=== Fettercairn House finds ===
Between October 1930 and March 1931, while searching for papers of the poet James Beattie that he had been told might be at Fettercairn House, Kincardineshire, Abbott discovered, in attics and outhouses there, 118 letters by Samuel Johnson and quantities of James Boswell's papers, including the latter's London Journal of 1762–3, believed lost, two other missing Boswell diaries, and over three hundred letters, as well as four manuscripts of published Boswell works. After completing cataloguing Abbott broke news of the finds in 1936. They amount to about a third of the total Boswell archive. Boswell's London Journal, 1762–3 became a best-seller when it was first published in F. A. Pottle's edition of 1950.

Abbott was the literary executor and editor of Gordon Bottomley's poems and plays. He is also remembered as an art collector and benefactor of galleries and libraries.

== Poems ==
Walsham–le–Willows
Peace past understanding shall tarry in Walsham–le–Willows,
No village had ever a name with so lovely a burden,
And there under blue and white clouds, pastured deep in warm summer
May the warm heart find healing.

Thus I thought: and the ways were made sweeter with lime-trees in blossom,
Pale flowers a-swing to bees drifting with honey-drunk murmur;
And bent willows stood rooted in meads whose yellow-turned haycocks
The white pullets plundered.

The cool stream flowed on half asleep and quiescent in beauty,
Old cottages pondered benignly their musk and blown roses,
The elms launched their great shadow ships floating deep green and silver
Over meadows sun-golden.

And peace fluttered down like a sleep upon Washam–le–Willows,
Like a dove that returns from the pool in the valley at sunset,
Dewy-feathered flies back to her mate and the nest on the hedge-top,
Stilled a worn heart with healing.

"Thankful for his country upbringing," Abbott, in his most typical poems, "tried to understand with greater love the existence and savour of country folk in Essex and Suffolk." His poems frequently focus on local characters – eccentrics and solitaries in Essex and Suffolk villages – on people in inns, on rural labourers, on rustic lovers.

Fulfilled love came to Abbott comparatively late in life, and briefly. It was the subject of his most ambitious poem, the long retrospective sequence called Summer Love, begun in the 1930s but not printed till 1958. It describes, in a variety of verse-forms, the pivotal love affair of his life, conducted during a long summer revisit to East Anglia with an unnamed woman from the North unfamiliar with the area and enchanted by it. "You who loved in July the drooping elms along these Essex lanes, / The willows fledging every idle stream ..." The affair was consummated high up inside an old elm, "the massive hollow trunk grotesquely bossed, with mighty boughs above." (Note: One of the Stuart elms at Numble End.)

The poems also contain much sensitive observation of wildlife and landscape. The numerous references to the elmscapes and waterways of East Anglia make Abbott a sort of verse Constable. His poems were occasionally anthologised, 'Stallion', for example, appearing in Younger Poets of To-day (1932), edited by J. C. Squire. Among others there are poems dedicated to Robert Bridges and Edmund Blunden. Despite Abbott's admiration for Hopkins, there is no trace in his poems of any theology.

== Publications ==
=== Poetry ===
- Youth and Age (1918)
- Poems (1921)
- Miss Bedell and Other Poems (Chatto & Windus, 1924)
- Ploughed Earth (Constable, 1930)
- Early Verses (1938)
- The Sand Castle and Other Poems (Jonathan Cape, 1946)
- Summer Love (Oxford University Press, 1958)
- The Collected Poems of Claude Colleer Abbott (Sidgwick & Jackson, 1963)

=== Translations ===
- Nine Songs from the Twelfth Century French (1920)
- Early Mediaeval French Lyrics (Constable, 1932): texts, verse translations, introduction
- The Seafarer: a modern version (Durham University Journal, 1943): translation from the Old English
- 'Three Old English Elegies' [The Wanderer, The Seafarer, The Wife's Lament], Durham University Journal, xxxvi (NS. V), p.76-79 (1943–1944)

=== Scholarship ===
- The Life and Letters of George Darley, poet and critic (Oxford University Press, 1928)
- Letters of Gerard Manley Hopkins to Robert Bridges (OUP, 1935; revised 1955)
- Correspondence of Gerard Manley Hopkins and Richard Watson Dixon (OUP, 1935; revised 1955)
- A Catalogue of Papers relating to Boswell, Johnson and Sir William Forbes, found at Fettercairn House (OUP, 1936)
- Further Letters of Gerard Manley Hopkins, including his correspondence with Patmore (OUP, 1938; revised 1956)
- The Poems and Plays of Gordon Bottomley, edited and introduced by Abbott (1953)
- Poet and Painter: being the correspondence between Gordon Bottomley and Paul Nash, 1910–1946 (OUP, 1955; Bristol, 1990): edited by Claude Colleer Abbott and Anthony Bertram
- Further Letters of Gerard Manley Hopkins, including his correspondence with Coventry Patmore (OUP, 1970)
