= Gordon Bottomley =

English poet

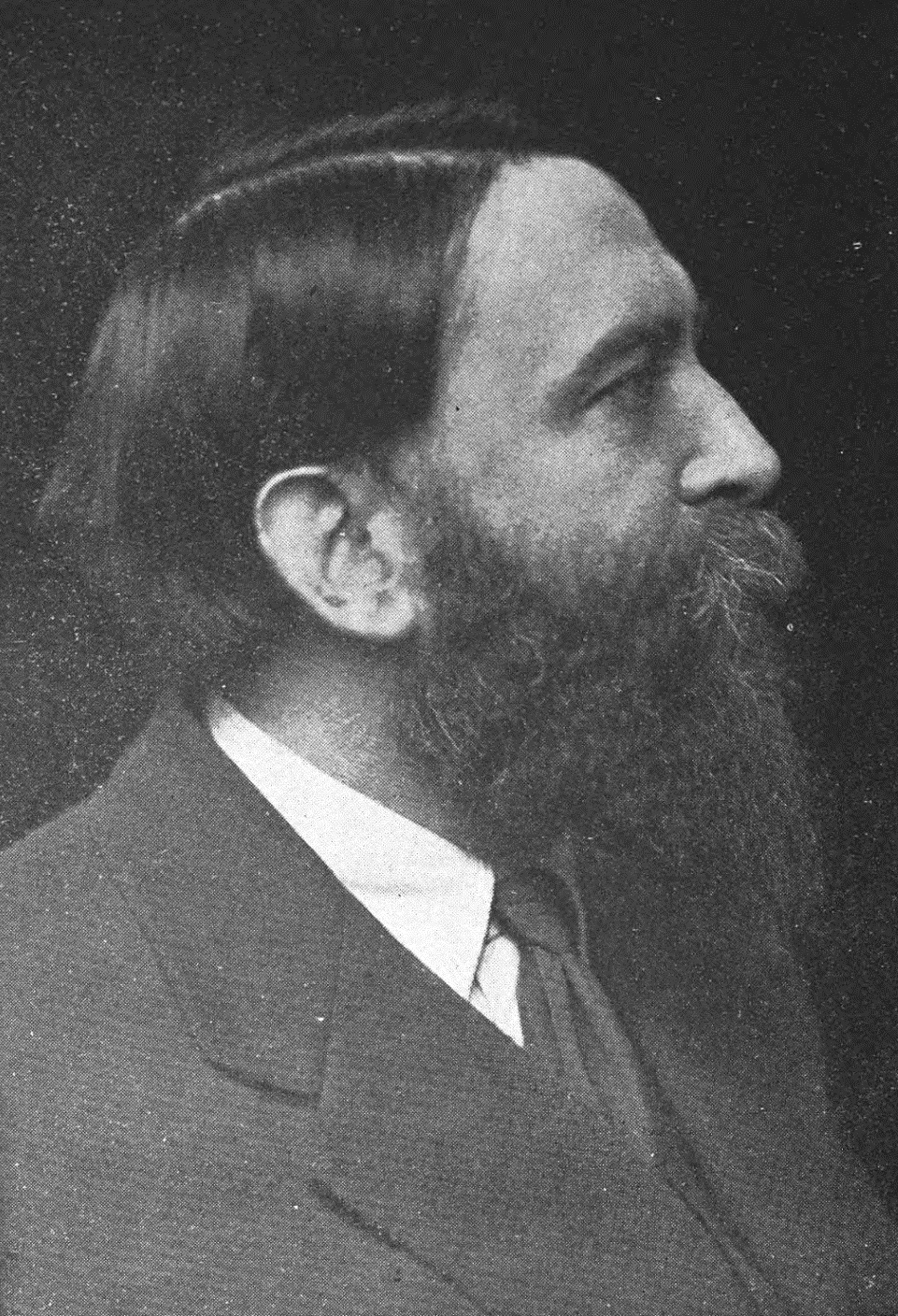
- Gordon Bottomley
- Born: 20 February 1874 Keighley, West Riding of Yorkshire, England
- Died: 25 August 1948 (aged 74) Silverdale, England
- Resting place: St. Fillan's Chapel, Dundurn, Perthshire
- Occupation: clerk, playwright, poet
- Spouse: Emily Burton

Gordon Bottomley (20 February 1874 – 25 August 1948) was an English poet, known particularly for his verse dramas. He was partly disabled by tubercular illness. His main influences were the later Victorian Romantic poets, the Pre-Raphaelites and William Morris.

== Background ==
Bottomley was born in Keighley, West Riding of Yorkshire on 20 February 1874, the only child of Maria and Alfred Bottomley. He was educated firstly at home by his mother and then at the local grammar school. Aged seven, Bottomley contracted a tubercular illness that would affect him for the rest of his life. As a result, he was invalided for long periods of time and was unable to travel widely or live in a town.

Bottomley became a junior clerk at the Craven Bank in Keighley at the age of 16. However, after an illness in 1891, he was transferred to the Bradford branch. Here he first visited the theatre and saw the Oscar Wilde play Lady Windermere's Fan. This stimulated his interest in plays.

Following another bout of illness in 1892 Bottomley left the bank and moved to Cartmel, Lancashire to live a life of passionate intense meditation and contemplation and began writing poetry. It was here in 1895 that he met Emily Burton. They married in 1905. The couple lived from 1914 in Silverdale, near Carnforth until their deaths. In the 1920s he was president of the Village Drama Society. In 1944 he was awarded an honorary Doctor of Letters at the University of Leeds. Bottomley died in 1948, outliving his wife by less than a year. Their ashes are interred at St. Fillan's Chapel at the base of Dundurn, Perthshire.

== Influences and writing ==
Bottomley began writing poetry in the 1890s and was influenced by the Romantic poets and even more so by such later figures as Rossetti and Algernon Swinburne. Bottomley included many famous writers, poets and artists as friends. While he mainly kept in contact with them through letters, he did make occasional visits to London, and also received visitors such as Arthur Ransome and Edward Thomas at his home.

His first book The Mickle Drede and Other Verses was printed privately at Kendal in 1896, and he wrote many more poems and plays, generally performed by amateurs or in experimental theatre. Bottomley also edited the poetry of Isaac Rosenberg in 1922, whom as a correspondent he had encouraged from 1915; while his close associate the composer Edgar Bainton (1880–1956) set The Crier by Night to music.

An early environmentalist, Bottomley's writing was always closely grounded in geographical location. A Scottish influence (echoing Yeats' Irish revival) appears in his late plays, while much of his earlier writing was rooted in Lakeland. Thus for example the ghost or bogle of Claife Heights, Windemere - the so-called Claife Crier - is used to resolve the conflict between a cruel farmers-wife and a serving maid in The Crier by Night; while one of his best-loved poems is known as Cartmel Bells:

"O, Cartmel bells ring soft tonight/And Cartmel bells ring clear, But I lie far away tonight,/Listening with my dear;

Listening in a frosty land/ Where all the bells are still..."

A collection of Bottomley's poems and plays was edited and introduced by his literary executor, Claude Colleer Abbott, in 1953.

== Art collecting ==
Among the most notable of his friendships was that with the artist Paul Nash. The two men were brought together in 1910 by Nash’s love of poetry and Bottomley’s extensive knowledge of painting. Bottomley encouraged the young artist and in exchange, Nash made several designs for Bottomley’s plays that he exhibited or used as illustrations. Despite increasingly divergent tastes in art, their friendship survived and a prolific lifelong correspondence between the two men was published in 1955.

Bottomley studied the work of artists and was a dedicated collector. He bought artworks when he could afford to and his friends also gave him their art in gratitude for his support and friendship. In the 1940s Bottomley and his wife Emily gave their personal art collection of six hundred paintings, prints and drawings to the Tullie House Museum and Art Gallery in Carlisle, Cumberland. The bequest included a nationally important collection of works by the Pre-Raphaelites including pictures by Dante Gabriel Rossetti, Edward Burne-Jones, William Morris, Arthur Hughes, Ford Madox Brown, Elizabeth Siddal and Simeon Solomon. The collection also included work from artists of other genres including those of Stanley Spencer, Samuel Palmer, Albert Moore, Frederic, Lord Leighton, Henri Fantin-Latour, Lucien Pissarro, William Nicholson, Walter Crane, Charles Conder, Jessie Marion King, William Morris's daughter May Morris, William Rothenstein, Charles Ricketts and of course Paul Nash. About 150 of these works were displayed in a temporary exhibition at Tullie House, "Pre-Raphaelites and Beyond: the Emily and Gordon Bottomley Bequest", from 7 July to 16 September 2001.

== Works ==
=== Poetry ===
- The Mickle Drede and Other Verses (1896)
- Poems at White Nights (1899)
- The Gate of Smaragdus (1904).
- Chambers of Imagery (1907, 1912)
- A Vision of Giorgione (1910)
- Poems of Thirty Years (1925)
- Darn and lies

=== Plays ===
- The Crier by Night (1902)
- Midsummer Eve (1905)
- Laodice and Danaë (1909)
- The Riding to Lithend (1909)
- King Lear's Wife (1915)
- Gruach (1921)
- Britain's Daughter (1921)
- Scenes and Plays (1929)
- Festival Preludes (1930)
- A Carol for Christmas - Day before Dawn (1930)
- "A Parting"
- Lyric Plays (1932)
- The Acts of St. Peter (1933)
- Choric Plays (1939)
- Kate Kennedy (1945)

=== Editions ===
- The Poems and Plays of Gordon Bottomley, edited with an introduction by C. Colleer Abbott (1953)

=== As editor ===
- The Collected Poems of Isaac Rosenberg (1937) edited with Denys Harding, Schocken Books, New York ISBN 978-0-80523-036-9

== See also ==
- Celtic Twilight
- Georgian poetry
- Noh play
