= John Tipler =

British journalist

Johnny Tipler is a freelance writer who was born in Leicester, lived in Leeds as a child, and grew up in Chelmsford.

He attended King's Ely, King Edward VI Grammar School Chelmsford, and then Southend College of Art. He studied at Stirling University and the University of East Anglia studying art history, and had a brief career as a conservator of medieval wall paintings. He had a career in public relations and journalism ranging from hotel promotion to motor racing in the JPS era, but is best known as an international motoring journalist and author. He has been writing books since 1990, with 47 published on a variety of motor vehicles, including Porsche, Morgan, Jensen, TVR, Lotus, Caterham and Alfa Romeo sports cars, Land Rovers, Triumph and Harley-Davidson motorcycles, plus several on Lotus Formula 1 cars, as well as biographies of racing drivers Graham Hill, Ronnie Peterson and Ayrton Senna.

He freelances for 911 & Porsche World, Classic Porsche, GT Porsche and Total 911 magazines, among others.

== Works ==
- 2000 Lotus Racing Cars: Dominance, Decline and Revival, 1968-2000
- 2001 Lotus 25 & 33
- 2005 Ayrton Senna: The Team Lotus Years
- 2011 La Carrera Panamericana: the World's Greatest Road Race
- 2014 Alfa Romeo Giulia Coupé GT and GTA
- 2015 Porsche Carrera: the aircooled era 1953-1996
