= H. H. Abbott =

British school master and poet (1891–1976)

Harold Henry Abbott
- Born: 20 June 1891; Broomfield, Essex
- Died: 4 January 1976 (aged 84); Broadstairs, Kent
- Occupation: Teacher
- Writing career
- Genre: Pastoral poetry

Harold Henry Abbott (20 June 1891 – 4 January 1976) was an English schoolmaster, for the last fifteen years of his career headmaster of grammar schools, who published poetry as H. H. Abbott.

His two volumes of 'Georgian'-type verse appeared in the 1920s and celebrated the lives of Essex rural folk and the Essex countryside, which he knew intimately. His poems have since fallen into relative obscurity.

== Life and career ==
The son of a butcher and brother of the poet and scholar Claude Colleer Abbott, Harold Henry Abbott was educated at King Edward VI Grammar School, Chelmsford, then read English and French literature at the University of London. After teaching at the King's School, Gloucester, Falmouth Grammar, Royal Grammar Worcester, and Hymers College, Hull (where he was second master, 1925–1935), he became headmaster of Beaminster Grammar School (1936–1938) and then of Hutton Grammar School (1938–1951). For a time, he was also an extramural lecturer at University College, Hull.

Abbott was one of the poets launched by Harold Monro and his publishing house The Poetry Bookshop, London. Ten poems in his first collection, Black & White (Poetry Bookshop, 1922), had previously appeared in Monro's periodical The Chapbook, and one, the title-poem, in a 1920 Harrap anthology. Black & White was well enough received for Chatto & Windus to accept his second collection, An Essex Harvest, and other poems (1925). Some of these poems had appeared in the New Statesman (1922–25) and in a second Harrap anthology.

His most typical pieces record the work and lives of Essex farming people, with some now unusual countryman's terms, or range descriptively "over the acres of our Essex land". There is much close observation of English nature and local topographical detail ("town" and "market" are Chelmsford). There are also a few personal poems, and a small number in a more experimental style. (Note: Abbott's first volume is briefly and unsympathetically discussed in Joy Grant's Harold Monro and the Poetry Bookshop (London, 1967). She does not refer to his second.) Mostly conversational in tone, his poems are traditional in form and metre, ranging from "blank-verse bucolics" or rhyming couplets to shorter lyrics. His long discursive poem, 'An Essex Harvest', is a sort of English Georgics.

Neither volume was reprinted. His poems are not known to have appeared in anthologies since the 1920s.

October Harvest
The latest harvest-waggon leaves the field,
And jolts towards the men atop the stack;
The eager resting horses, hedge-concealed,
Whinny their greeting as it passes back.

Here in the pathway, deep-worn by carts,
A single poppy shivers in the wind,
Like a belated reveller, who starts
To see the pale face of the dawn outlined.

There on the pool a swan dejected rides,
And waits in vain his dead mate's homeward hail:
A cloud blots out the sun's chill light, and hides
The silver birch's battered coat-of-mail.

Where is the promise of unfurling spring?
The splendid luxury of summer's pride?
Earth, like a prodigal at winter's sting,
Reft of her cloak, goes stumbling in her stride.

The robin's song has come again:
After the morning mist the clear fresh sun
Shines on the tinkling stubble and the thatcher's men,
Strawing and sprindling now that harvest's done.

The robin's song has come again:
A song to match the silver drops of dew,
To tell me hips and haws are red, and when (oh when!)
Berries are full of wine and black of hue.

The robin's song has come again:
High in the hedges hazel-clusters sway
Milky and crisp, and in their moist and grassy den
The naked, smooth-skinned mushrooms shrink from day.

His third volume, The Riddles of the Exeter Book (1968), was a collection of his verse-translations from Old English, of Anglo-Saxon riddles. Sixteen of these had appeared in his 1925 volume.

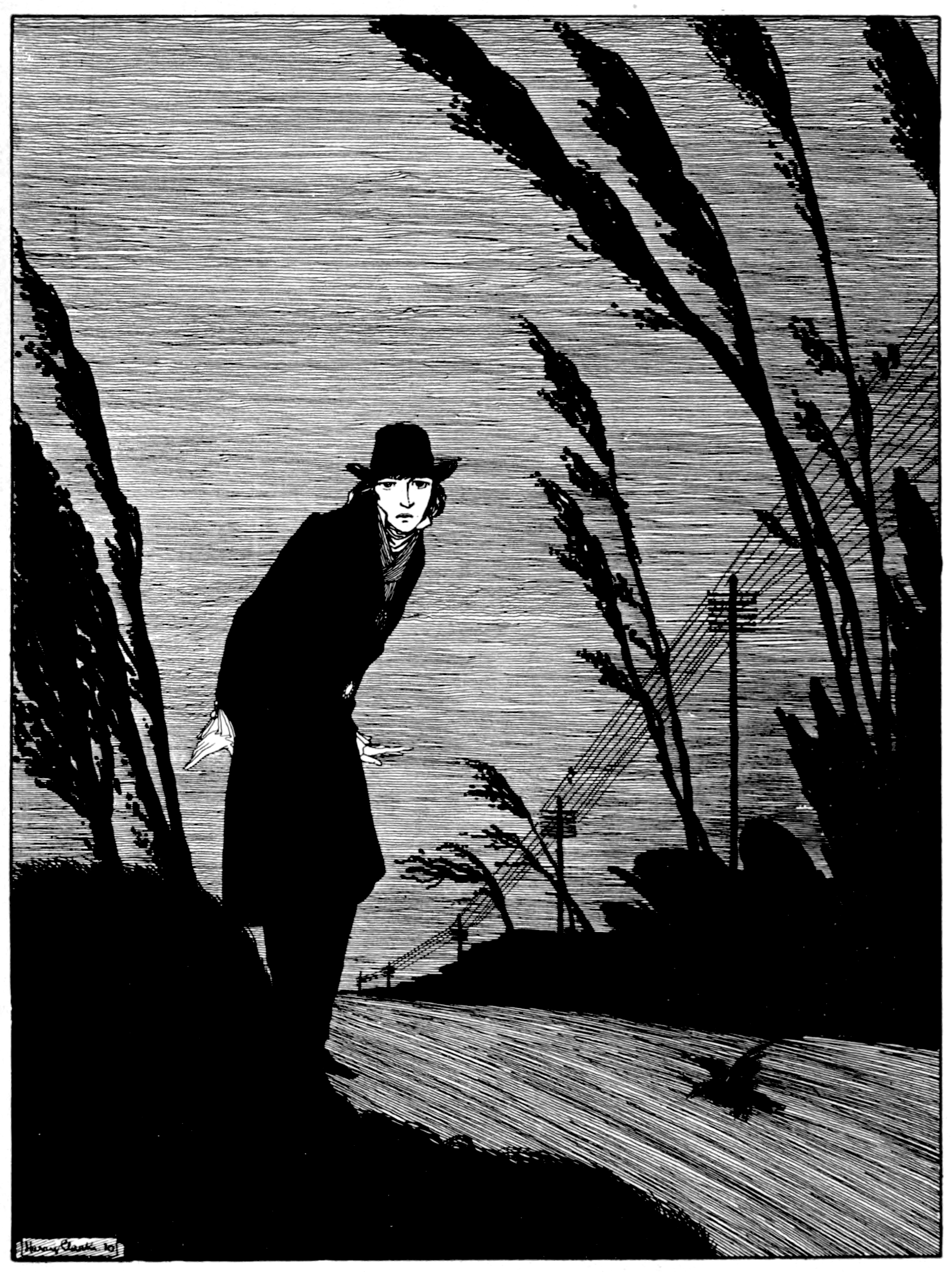
Harry Clarke's illustration for Abbott's poem 'Black and White', in The Year's at the Spring: An Anthology of Recent Poetry (New York, 1920)

== Personal life ==
In 1929 Abbott married Kathleen Joan Hart, and they had three children.

== Publications ==
- Black & White, The Poetry Bookshop, London, 1922; verse
- An Essex Harvest, and other poems, Chatto & Windus, London, 1925; verse and verse translations
- The Riddles of the Exeter Book, The Golden Head Press, Cambridge, 1968; verse translations, with introduction and notes; foreword by Douglas Cleverdon
- 'The Work of D. H. Lawrence', Humberside [periodical], vol. 1, no. 1, October 1922; essay
