= Listed buildings in Hutton, Lancashire =

Hutton is a civil parish in the South Ribble district of Lancashire, England. It contains five listed buildings that are recorded in the National Heritage List for England. All of the listed buildings are designated at Grade II, the lowest of the three grades, which is applied to "buildings of national importance and special interest". The parish is mainly residential, and all the listed buildings are houses.

== Buildings ==
Name and location	Photograph	Date	Notes
138 and 140 Ratten Lane; 53.73845°N 2.77158°W	—	17th century (probable)	A pair of cruck-framed cottages in brick each in a single storey. No.138 has 3 1/2 bays, and it contains three full cruck trusses. Inside No. 140 is one full cruck truss and part of another.
Nutters Platt Farmhouse; 53.73181°N 2.72773°W	—	1653	A pebbledashed brick house with a slate roof in two storeys. It has a two-bay main range with a cross wing to the right. In the left bay is a two-storey gabled porch that has stone jambs and a large inscribed lintel. The windows are casements. At the rear is a single-storey outshut.
Hutton Manor; 53.73125°N 2.76231°W	—	1690	Originally a farmhouse, it is in brick with a slate roof. There are two storeys and three bays. On the front is a two-storey gabled porch with an inscribed lintel, above which is a sliding sash window. At the rear is a round-headed stair window; the other windows have been altered. Inside the house are bressumers.
150 Ratten Lane; 53.73829°N 2.77293°W	—	Early 18th century (probable)	Originally a farmhouse, it is in rendered brick with a thatched roof. It has two storeys and two bays. At the right is a doorway, with a later bay window to the left. The other windows on the front are casements. Inside there is an inglenook with a large bressumer.
Rawstorne House; 53.72797°N 2.73086°W	—	1827	Originally a workhouse, later converted into a house, it is in brick with stone dressings, and has a slate roof. The building has a long rectangular plan and is in three storeys. There is a double flight of steps leading to a first floor entrance. The windows, of varying sizes, contain top-hung casements. On the front is a tablet containing an inscription.
