= Hutton Grammar School =

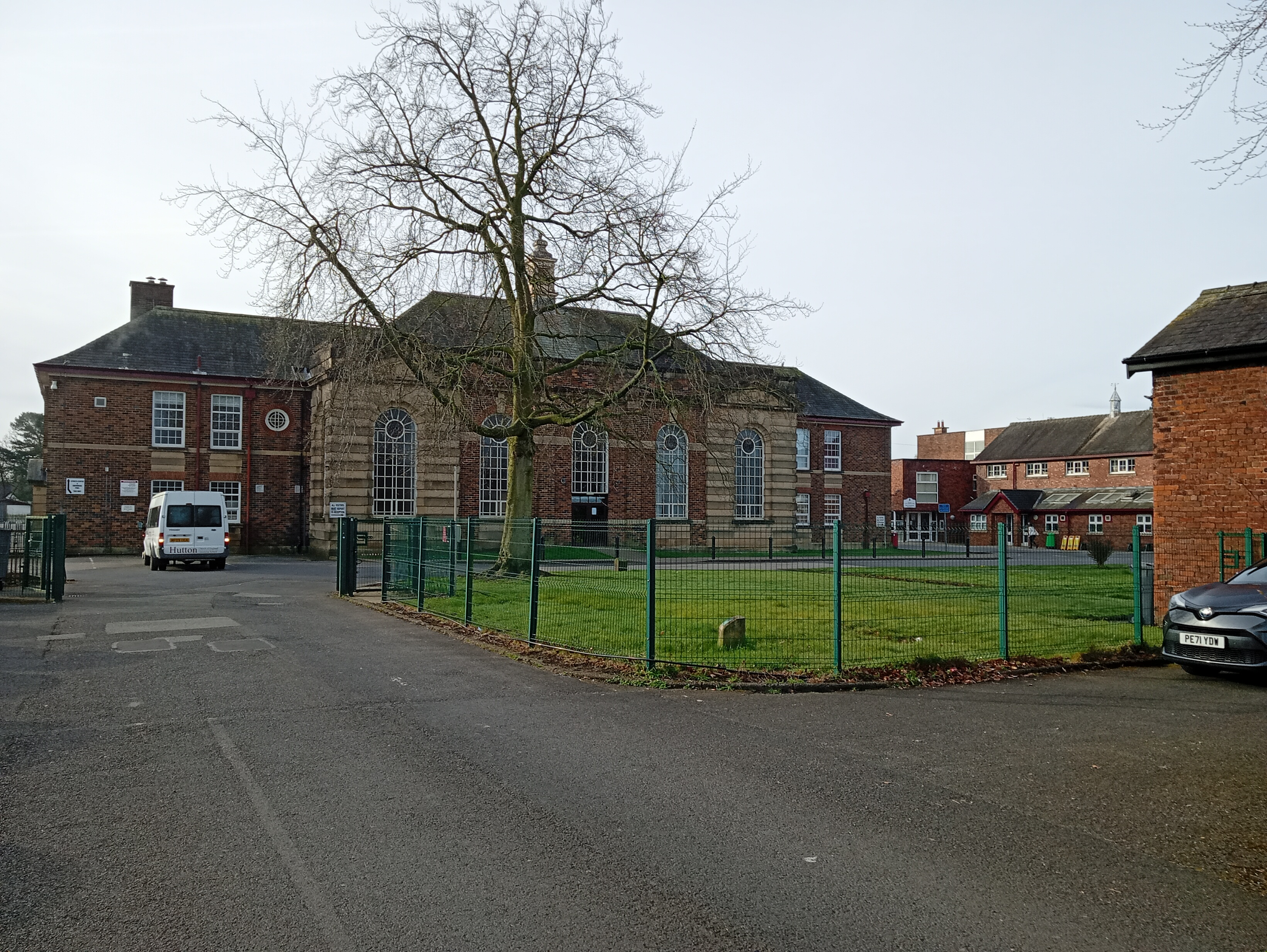
- School crest Hutton Grammar School as viewed by the front

Location
- Liverpool Road; Hutton; Preston, Lancashire, PR4 5SN; England

Information
- Type: 11–18 boys Voluntary aided school
- Motto: "In your relationships with one another, have the same mindset as Christ Jesus"
- Religious affiliation: Church of England
- Established: 1552; 474 years ago
- Founder: Christopher Walton
- Local authority: Lancashire
- Department for Education URN: 119794 Tables
- Ofsted: Reports
- Chair: Rev Sam Crossley
- Headteacher: Nicola Moran
- Gender: Boys (Girls in Sixth Form only)
- Age: 11 to 18
- Enrolment: 823 (Max Capacity of 1008)
- Houses: Fleetwood, Hines, Rawsthorne, Walton, Pearson
- Colour
- Former Pupils: Huttonians
- Campus: Rural
- Specialism: Maths and Computing
- Website: Hutton Grammar School

Hutton Grammar School is an 11–18 boys voluntary aided, state-funded Church of England comprehensive day school. It is located 3 miles (4.8 km) south west of Preston, Lancashire, in Hutton, England. It provides education for boys from the age of 11 to 16, and in the Sixth Form (since 1979) for both boys and girls.

The school no longer offers boarding. The school is ranked 5th in the league tables in the North-West and 2nd place for AS-A2 results. It was also the Lancashire Rugby School of the Year, for two years running, for 2007 and 2008. Hutton has also achieved Specialist Schools Status accreditation in Mathematics and Computing. While historically the motto of the school, even being inscribed in school buildings and windows was "Aut disce aut discede" meaning "Either learn or leave." Under the headteacher, Nicola Moran, the school adopted the Philippians 2:5 quote "In your relationships with one another, have the same mindset as Christ Jesus."

== History ==
=== Origins ===
The school can trace its antecedents back to 1517, with the school building site being personally approved by Henry VIII in that year. In 1520, the school was granted permission, by William Walton, a former priest of Longton, to all boys in the area. It was William's personal investment, to provide for his family and give the local children a chantry-school to attend. When William died in 1528, he left a chalice and a mass book to the chapel.

In 1545, when William Walton, the co-founder of the chantry had died, Henry VIII, near to death, ordered the dissolution of all chantries and the confiscation of their property. The desired building, in Hutton, was, at the time, even though confirmed by Henry VIII, 28 years before, would be demolished if it was reported to be still standing. However, the man appointed to supervise the dissolution of the Lancashire chantries was Sir Henry Farington, a former benefactor of St. Andrews Church in Longton. He falsely reported that he could find no chantries in that part of the county, in order to save the demolition of various buildings in the area.

To avoid suspicion of using a chantry for a school, although the false statement was given, they started to use a small cottage down School Lane, in Longton to educate the local children.

=== Grammar school ===
In 1552, William's nephew Christopher Walton of Little Hoole, used a part of the original endowment to found the grammar school, down School Lane in Longton. According to the law at the time, a priest must be in charge of a school, traveling inspectors could have closed it down they saw that a commoner was in charge. Therefore, in 1554, Ralph Garstang, priest of St. Andrew's Church, was appointed as the schoolmaster of the school.

For the next few centuries, from 1560 to 1746, it was known as Longton Free School. It was not until 1747 that the roles of schoolmaster and priest were finally disconnected, though many subsequent headmasters were also priests (vide infra). The school was then rebuilt, at Hutton on its present site, built on land that had been a part of William Walton's original grant. Henceforth, it became known as Hutton Grammar School (often the Free Grammar School according to many references) and by 1861, the Head Master began to live on site. By 1881, it had become an all-boys school - in 1881 there were 22 boarders and 30 day boys, the 1901 census lists 35 boarders, the 1911 census lists 41 boarders. 165 boys were attending the school in 1922. In the 1950s and 1960s, there were 57 boarders in addition to the day boys. The boarding house closed in 1971

The original building, built around 1750 was extended in the late 19th Century. In the early 20th Century there were further extensions and additional buildings were added. In the 1920s a fine headmaster's house was built by Lt Col Reverend Charles P. Hines. A first floor was added to one extension in 1923, such was the demand for extra space. The indoor swimming pool was added by 1935. A large new block was opened in October 1931, consisting of a large assembly hall, 7 classrooms, laboratories and staff facilities, allowing pupil numbers to increase from 121 to 270 boys. This was extended in 1957 with the addition of a larger library, sixth form, chemistry laboratory and classrooms. This allowed 3 form entry and the number of pupils increased to 450, rising to over 500 by 1961. The original 18th Century school building had to be demolished and rebuilt in 1965. Some of the late 19th and early 20th-century buildings are still in use.

=== Establishment of houses ===
The School has an established House System with, by 1957, Breakell-Moss House, Henry Hibbert House, Hines House (to which all boarders belonged), Penwortham House, Rawstorne House and Walton House. The Houses are particularly competitive in inter-house school sports. While some houses cease to exist, the house system still remains to this day, including Fleetwood, Hines, Walton, Pearson, and Rawsthorne.

Although now a comprehensive, the school to this day still retains its grammar school ethos, enabling it to produce results which are amongst the highest in the area. Sports such as rugby and cross-country running play a serious role at Hutton, with Hutton regularly defeating local independent schools such as Arnold School, Kirkham Grammar School, Rossall School and Stonyhurst College.

== Overview ==
=== Inspection Reports ===
The main school received an Ofsted report in May 2022 and achieved the grade of "good".

=== Curriculum ===
The main school features students from Years 7 to 11. It combines GCSEs through the following subjects: English Language, English Literature, Mathematics, Modern Language, Sciences and Religion, with additional subjects, including History, Geography, Economics, Art, Design, Music and Theatre Arts.

The school's Sixth form allows students to take a number of the following subjects: English Language & Literature, English Literature, Fine Art, Photography, Biology, Business, Chemistry, Computer Science, Design Technology (Product Design), Economics, French Language, Further Mathematics, Geography, History, Mathematics, Music, Music Technology, Physical Education, Physics, Politics, Psychology, Religious Studies and Sociology.

The Sixth Form is a key part of the school and is a quasi-autonomous body within Hutton Grammar School.

=== Sports ===
The school offers more than 15 sports. The main sports at the school are rugby in the winter term and cricket in the summer term. Former England rugby captain Steve Borthwick attended the school, as did fellow England international Tony Swift, and leading coach Brian Ashton taught at the school at the start of his coaching career.

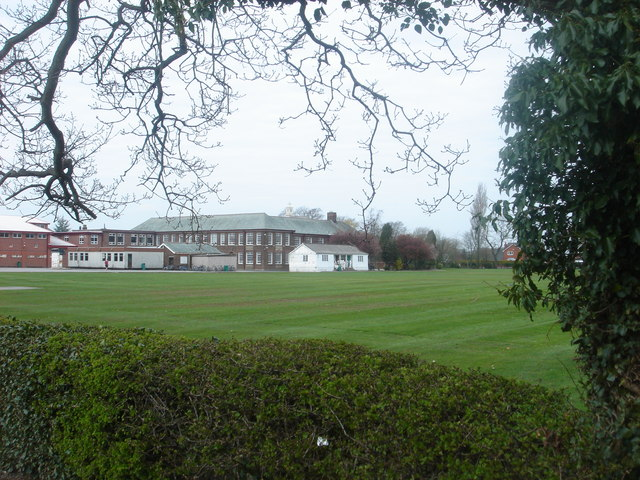
A 2009 view of Hutton Grammar from the back

Other sports offered include: athletics, Aussie rules, badminton, basketball, chess, cross country running, dance, football, Gaelic football, gymnastics, handball, hockey, swimming, table tennis, tennis, and volleyball.

=== Facilities ===
Under headmasters Tom Bennett and David Pearson the school was considerably redeveloped, with facilities such as a new gymnasium and I.T and Mathematics suites installed in 2004. The Music Department now has recording studios and technology suites.

In September 2005, new maths facilities were opened. Following the opening of the new maths suites in the Autumn of 2005, the buildings were used for housing of the resistant materials and art until the end of the academic year of 2006, while the departments were being refurbished.

The old buildings were demolished in the months of July and August 2006 and then in July 2006, the new music and drama suites were opened. Following a large interest in the Sixth Form, due to outstanding results, the Sixth Form was relocated to a new building in September 2010.

=== Extracurricular activities ===
Hutton has many internal and external organisations, one of these being the Old Huttonians Association which is open to all previous attendees of the school. The association organises dinners and reunions on a semi regular basis. There is also a Masonic Lodge which meets at the school. Old Huttonian Lodge no. 7614 is part of the Leyland Group of Lodges and Chapters and meets 5 times a year. A member of the Federation of School Lodges, it draws membership from current and past teachers, past pupils and their close relatives.

The debating society won the national 'Debating Matters' competition at the Royal Society of Medicine, having never previously entered. The 2015 Hutton debating team won the Lancashire regional heat, which sent them through to the North West & North Wales regional final, which they went on to win. Hutton eventually lost out in the group stages of the national finals in June 2015. However, a year later, the 2016 cohort reached the final of the national finals, finishing runners up. It was the first time Hutton had reached the national finals in consecutive years.

The Hutton Grammar Economics Society is open to all present and past students of the school. The school had its own radio station, Hutt on Air, which first broadcast on 9 July 2010 and was broadcast to the students (and sixth form) via the school computers and internal AVOID systems.

== List of Headmasters ==
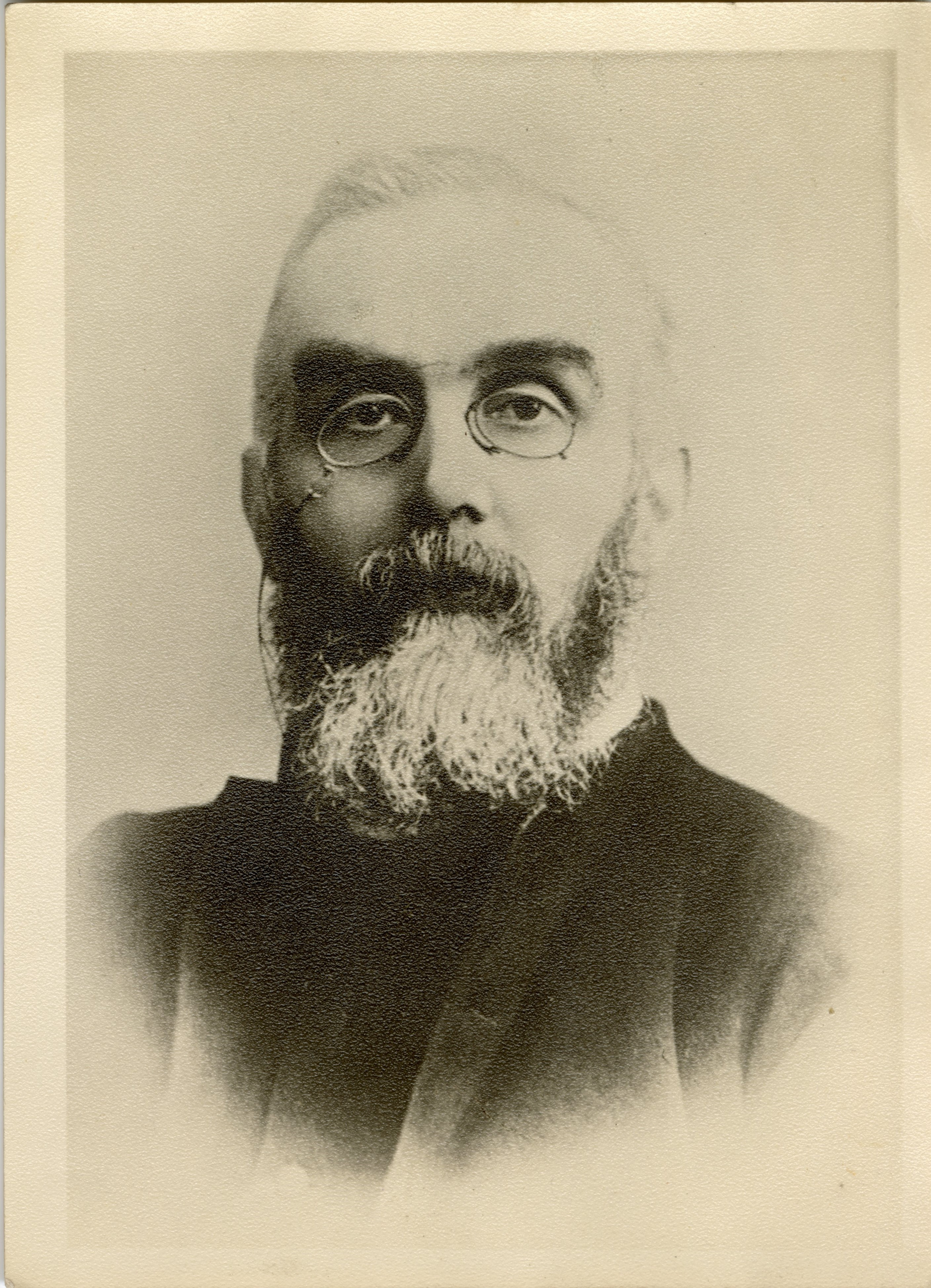
Rev. Benjamin Corke Huntly

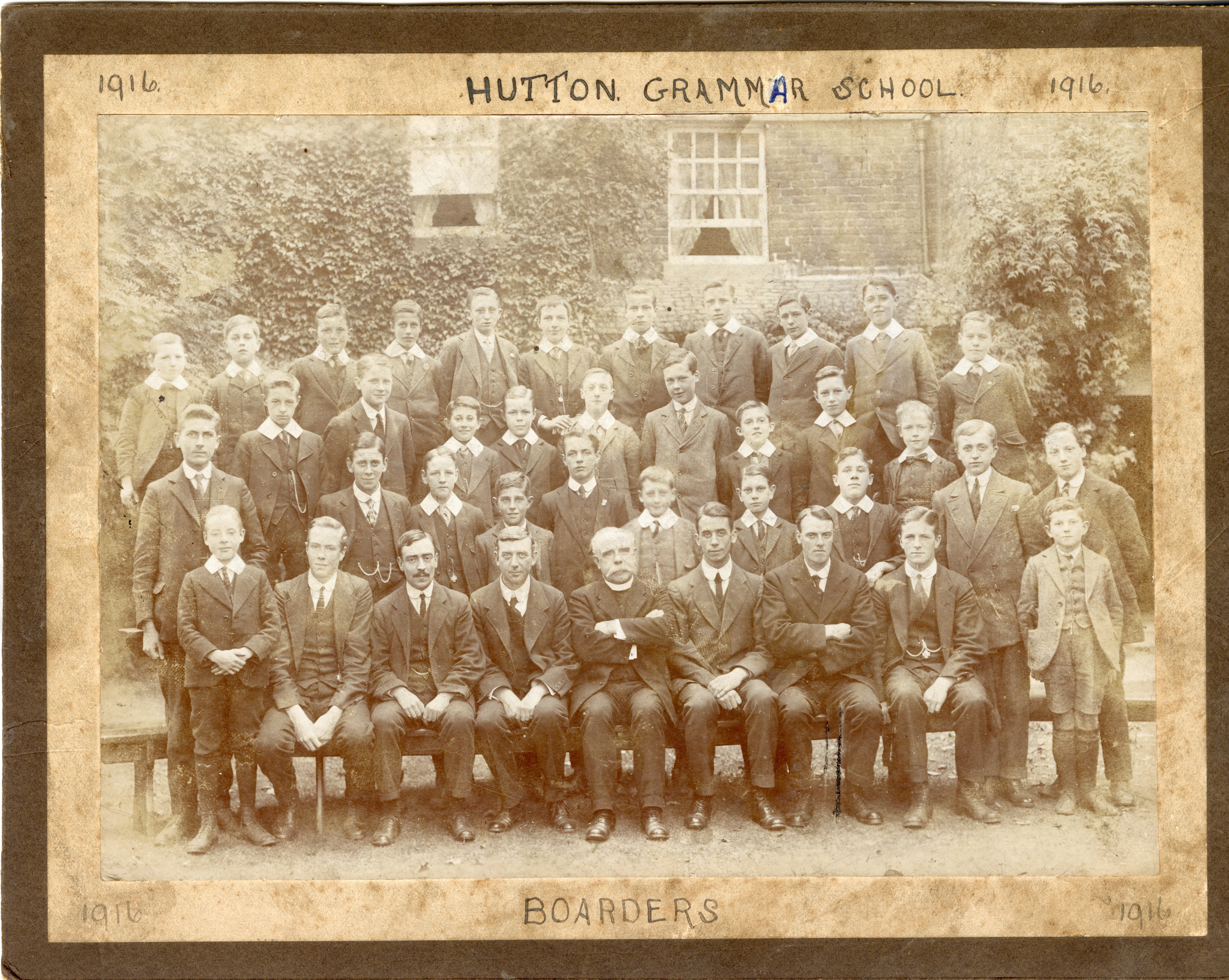
Boarders of Hutton in 1916.

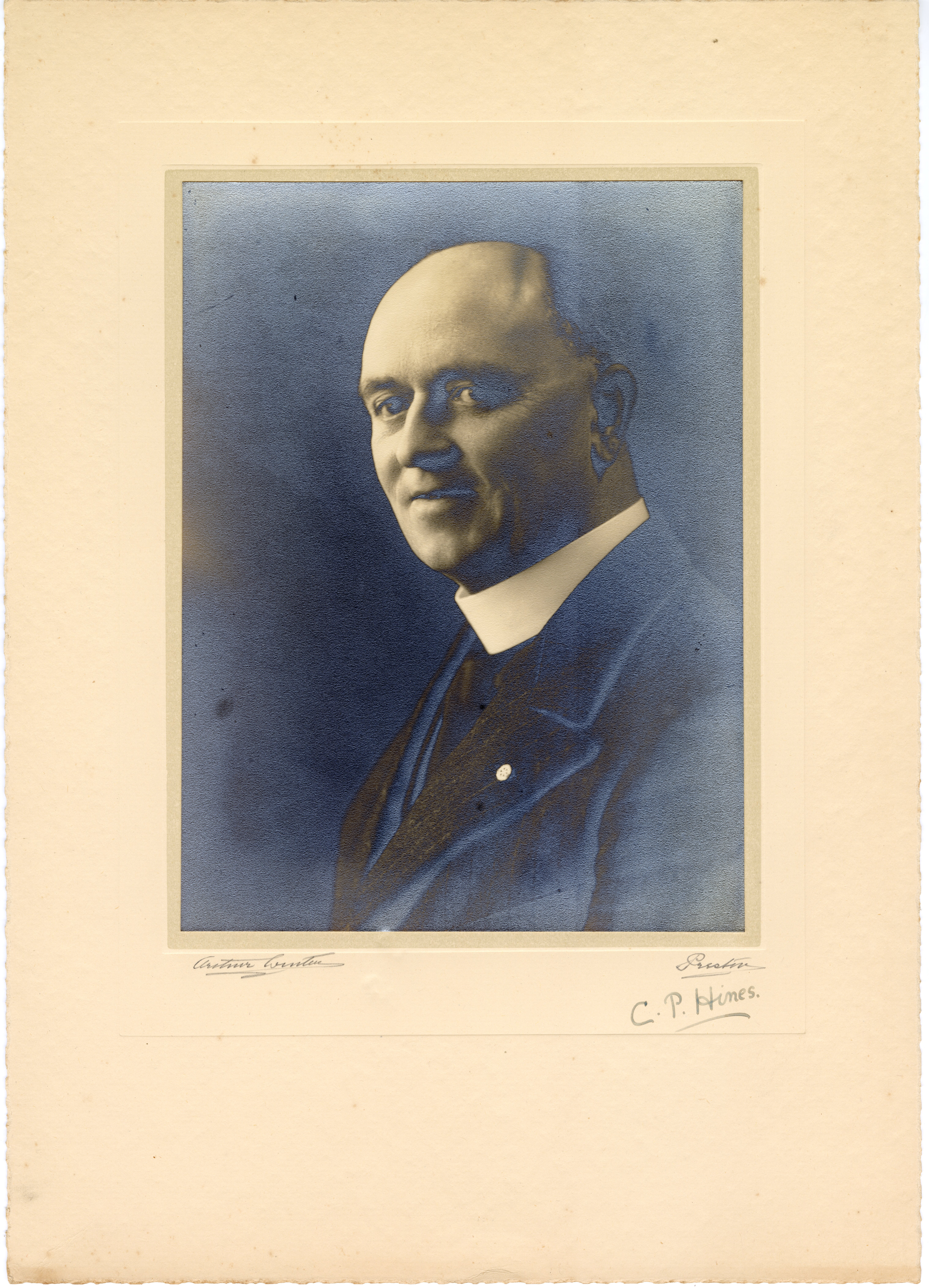
Charles Percy Hines in 1938

- 1517 to 1528. William Walton, priest.
- 1528 to 1533. John Walton, born 1468, appointed to serve for six years until Robert Farington came of age.
- 1533 to 1541. Robert son of Richard Farington.
- 1542 to 1563. Ralph Garstang, priest of St. Andrews Church
- 1608. Rev Edward Singleton, the first Anglican Minister appointed in October.
- 1622. Gilbert Mawdesley. First known on 28 March 1594.
- 1635. Richard Barker, a lecturer in 1622 and school master from Bispham Green in 1635.
- 1648 to 1652. Richard Briggs, a Protestant.
- 1662 to 1700. William Bannester, baptised on 13 Jul 1636 at Croston as the son of Richard Bannester; recorded as school master 30 March 1673 and died as such in 1700.
- 1701 to 1751. Rev Timothy Corless, known for giving few orders. Born in Cockerham in 1676 as the son of George Corless. Buried 22 December 1751 in Cockerham as 'Clerk of Longton in the parish of Pemphberton'.
- 1750 to 1786. Richard Hull, of Hutton died while head master and buried 6 June 1786.
- 1805. Rev Richard Rowe died on 13 June 1805, while headmaster.
- 1805 to 1822. Rev Thomas Whitehead, died while headmaster in November 1822.
- 1822 to 1838. Rev Thomas Whitehead, son of the previous headmaster.
- 1839 to 1851. Rev William Harrison.
- 1851 to 1871. Rev John Ketton, appointed May 1851.
- 1871 to 1876. John Joseph Cooper.
- 1878. Rev Benjamin Corke Huntly M.A. Born January 1843 in Cranbrook, Kent and ordained as a priest in 1866. Assistant master at Dulwich College from 1866-75, Chaplain at San Paulo and Santos, Brazil, 1875-8. Appointed November 1878 and died age 47, while headmaster, on 9 May 1890, buried 14 May 1890.
- 1891 to 1920. Rev Thomas Joseph Cunningham M.A.
- 1920 to 1938. Lieutenant Colonel Reverend Charles Percy Hines.
- 1938 to 1951. Harold Henry Abbott, the poet.
- 1951 to 1963. Charles William Lloyd. Left upon appointment as headmaster at Alleyn's School.
- 1963 (Autumn term). Alfred E Ashburner, acting headmaster.
- 1964 to 1983. J Nelson.
- 1983 to July 2000. Gavin Armstrong.
- September 2000 to 2005. Tom P. Bennett.
- 2005. Mr Bradley (Interim).
- 2005. David Pearson, appointed April 2005.
- 2016. Mark Bradshaw, appointed April 2016.
- 2023. Nicola Moran, appointed January 2023.

== Notable former pupils ==
- Steve Borthwick, former England rugby union captain, former head coach of Leicester Tigers and now head coach of England national rugby union men's team.
- Brian Cookson OBE, former president of the International Cycling Union and British Cycling
- Peter Elleray, Formula One and 24 Hours of Le Mans Racing car designer.
- Edward Gardner, former Royal Navy Commander, survivor of two ship sinkings, barrister and later, a politician
- Nigel Jemson, former Premier League footballer
- Graham Mather represented Hampshire North and Oxford in the European Parliament from 1994 to 1999
- Richard G. Mitchell Composer known for writing and producing movie and TV scores
- Nazia Mogra, Children's TV presenter and senior television journalist
- Jonathan Myles-Lea, painter
- Howard Stableford, former presenter of the BBC's Tomorrow's World and Newsround
- Tony Swift, former England Rugby international
- David Williams, chief executive of the United Kingdom Space Agency since 2010 (formerly the British Nationals Space Centre)
- James Hill, professional footballer
