= Lady Eleanor Holles School =

Location
- Hanworth Road; Hampton, TW12 3HF; England; 51°25′39″N 0°22′07″W

Information
- Type: Private day school
- Motto: Spes Audacem Adjuvat (Hope favours the bold)
- Established: 1710; 316 years ago
- Local authority: Richmond upon Thames
- Department for Education URN: 102932 Tables
- Chair: C. S. Stokes
- Headmistress: Rowena Cole
- Gender: Girls
- Age: 7 to 18
- Enrolment: 900
- Capacity: 922
- Houses: DeVere, Fitzwilliam, Holles and Tyrconnel
- Colours: Red, White and Black
- Publication: Redview
- Boat club: Lady Eleanor Holles School Boat Club
- Website: www.lehs.org.uk

Lady Eleanor Holles School (often abbreviated to LEH or LEHS) is a private day school for girls in Hampton, London. It consists of a small junior school and a larger senior school, which operate from different buildings on the same 24-acre (10-hectare) site. It is a member of the Girls' Schools Association and the Headmasters' and Headmistresses' Conference.

== History ==
The school was founded in 1710 with an endowment from Lady Eleanor Holles, the daughter of John Holles, 2nd Earl of Clare. The original site is commemorated by a plaque on one of the Barbican walkways.

In 1878, the middle school moved to a new building at 182 Mare Street in East Hackney, which was later owned by the Cordwainers Company and now forms part of the London College of Fashion.

In 1937 the school moved to its permanent site in Hampton. The first buildings in Hampton were designed by Colonel F. S. Hammond, whose father had designed the Hackney school and were opened by Princess Alice, Duchess of Gloucester.

The school celebrated its 300th anniversary with a thanksgiving service at St Paul's Cathedral, London on 18 November 2011, then a eucharist at Trinity College, Cambridge and a ball at The Hurlingham Club in May 2012.

== Structure ==
Pupils come from a wide catchment area extending as far as Ealing, Woking, Wimbledon and Ascot, and there is a coach service running over 23 routes operated jointly with Hampton School. The 111 public bus runs in front of Hampton School and the 285 bus runs at the back of the junior school.

It is not affiliated with any other school or foundation and operates as an independent registered charity and limited company overseen by a board of governors.

The Independent Schools Inspectorate Integrated report in 2013 said "It aims to develop well-rounded individuals while striving for academic excellence."

== Facilities ==
The school's facilities include the Millennium Boat House on the Thames, used by the Lady Eleanor Holles School Boat Club and jointly owned with the adjacent Hampton School. The arts centre with 330-seat theatre designed by Walters & Cohen and completed in 2013 won a RIBA London Award in 2014.

The 'Student Gateway', designed by Scott Brownrigg, was completed in 2018, linking the sports hall and swimming pool to the main building, and includes computing and product design suites, enlarged sports changing rooms, a viewing gallery for the swimming pool, an activity studio and an ergometer (rowing machine) room.

== Curriculum ==
The curriculum is based on the National Curriculum. Girls typically study ten GCSE subjects, including English language and literature, Mathematics and the Sciences (combined or separate), with the other 4-5 being chosen from 16 options, subject to various constraints (At least one humanities subject must be chosen, at least one languages subject must be chosen, and students are encouraged not to choose more than 2 non-examined subjects such as art or textiles). An additional Free-standing Maths Qualification (FSMQ) is offered to girls at the end of Year 10 in the place of Further Maths, and those who chose it learn the content for it alongside their usual Maths GCSE. They then go on to study 3 or 4 A-Level subjects chosen from 23 courses, commonly accompanied by an Extended Project Qualification. Students were customarily required to start with 4 A Levels upon reaching Sixth Form, though this rule is no longer enforced, just encouraged. They are only allowed to study a fifth if it is Further Maths.

== Extracurricular activities ==
=== Sport ===
The 2013 ISI report said "around 30 pupils represent their country in sport, with numerous successes at national level for rowing, lacrosse, netball and swimming." In 2017 the figure was 29 girls, covering Gymnastics, Swimming, Acrobatics, Rowing, Hockey and Lacrosse. The school won the National Schools Lacrosse Under 19A Championship in 2018, and has been county champion for 11 years in a row. It held the National Schools Regatta (rowing) course record for Championship Girls Eights from 1994 until 2017 (when it was broken by both Headington and Henley).

Other activities including CCF, Young Enterprise, The Duke of Edinburgh's Award, Model United Nations, Service Volunteers are run jointly with Hampton School.

=== Music and drama ===
There are 5 choirs and over 20 musical ensembles and bands in the senior school. Lessons are available in 24 instruments, and there is a dedicated recording studio. The 2013 ISI report said "over the last three years, 20 pupils have been selected for national music groups." In 2010 the Holles Singers, a choir at the school, won the BBC Youth Choir of the Year.

== Notable staff ==
- Beryl Crockford, Olympic rower

== Notable alumnae ==
- Pam Alexander, former chair of the Covent Garden Market Authority
- Julia Armfield, author
- Charlotte Attenborough, actress
- Jane Attenborough, arts administrator and Boxing Day Tsunami victim
- Lynn Barber, journalist
- Caroline Bird, poet
- Celia Brackenridge, child-protection expert
- Hannah Collins, artist
- Daisy Dunn, classicist, author, journalist and critic
- Beatie Edney, actress
- Daisy Fancourt, researcher
- Poppy Gilbert, actress in Stay Close (2021), Chloe (2022)
- Carola Hicks, art historian
- Stephanie Hilborne, chief executive since 2004 of The Wildlife Trusts, and from 2000 to 2004 of Wildlife and Countryside Link
- Lucy Irvine, writer
- Jay Hunt, television executive
- Vivien Jones, lacrosse player
- Vanessa Kirby, actress (Fast & Furious Presents: Hobbs & Shaw, The Crown)
- Clare Lawrence Moody, actress
- Iris Loveridge, concert pianist
- Juliet Morris, television presenter
- Sasha Nash, led the Red Arrows from 2026.
- Annie Nightingale, BBC journalist
- Sue Owen, Permanent Secretary for the Department for Digital, Culture, Media and Sport
- Barbara Pearse, biological scientist
- Franki Raffles, feminist social documentary photographer
- Saskia Reeves, actress
- Dame Lesley Regan, gynaecologist
- Pamela Schwerdt, horticulturalist, joint head gardener at Sissinghurst Castle Garden for 31 years.
- Jane Thynne, novelist, journalist and broadcaster
- Alys Thomas, British swimmer
- Gail Trimble, academic and captain of the Corpus Christi College, Oxford team at the 2009 University Challenge
