= Evelyn Gillan =

Dr. Evelyn Gillan
- Born: 4 August 1959; Tranent, East Lothian
- Died: 14 July 2015 (aged 55); Edinburgh
- Education: University of Edinburgh
- Occupation: Social Campaigner
- Known for: Campaigner for women's rights, co-founder of No Tolerance campaign and main proponent of minimum unit pricing for alcohol policy.

Evelyn Gillan (4 August 1959 – 14 July 2015) was a champion of women’s rights, co-founder of the Zero Tolerance campaign and the main proponent in bringing about a minimum alcohol pricing law in Scotland.

== Early life and education ==
Evelyn Gillan was born in the mining town of Tranent, East Lothian, on 4 August 1959. Her mother, Bridget, was a civil service administrator and her father, Joe, was a postal worker. She had one younger sister, Jacky, and one older sister, Valerie. Dux of her primary school, Gillan was academically successful and was expected to go straight to university but elected instead to become a hairdresser in a salon in Edinburgh. She then travelled in Europe for a few years, working odd jobs in several countries along the way.

=== Moray House: School of Education and early activism ===
Gillan returned to Edinburgh in 1976, studying social work at Moray House. Her earliest activism as a student found her leading a campaign against the Chilean Dictator Pinochet and subsequently being elected President of the Students’ Council.

Rossana Leal recalls arriving in Scotland in 1977, as a Chilean refugee, saying that:

I was trying to tell anyone who would listen about Pinochet’s dictatorship. Evelyn made a beautiful speech at Moray House Students Union to gather support for the people of Chile and this later resulted in a homage to Pablo Neruda at which Sorley Maclean, Norman MacCaig and Hamish Henderson performed.

On leaving Moray House, Gillan received the Gordon memorial award, presented to the best all-around student.

== Career ==
Gillan was appointed as Campaigns Officer of the Women’s Committee of Edinburgh Council in 1985. She initiated several campaigns, including Edinburgh for Free, Safer Streets, Change the Change, and Zero Tolerance, and organized the annual celebrations for International Women's Day. In 2002, she went on sabbatical to spend time with her young son and complete her PhD in social policy at University of Edinburgh (which she completed in 2008).

In 2006, Gillan became the first director of Scottish Health Action on Alcohol Problems (SHAAP). She was appointed chief executive of Alcohol Focus Scotland in 2010, and the Alcohol (Minimum Pricing) (Scotland) Act was passed in 2012, during her tenure there.

== Death and legacy ==
Gillan became ill with gastric cancer in 2014, and was named an honorary fellow of the Royal College of Physicians of Edinburgh, in recognition of her work in promoting Scotland’s health shortly before her death on 14 July 2015. Zero Tolerance Board member Lesley Orr said: "Evelyn is in the great tradition of thrawn Scots who shake up complacency, disrupt the way things are, and won't let go until they’ve been transformed. She spoke truth to power with integrity and humour. In a recent interview she was asked about the last thing that scared her. Evelyn's response was 'I prefer hope over fear'." First Minister Nicola Sturgeon said "For me, the single word that best describes Evelyn is 'passion'."
