= Hutton, Lancashire =

Village in Lancashire, England

Coordinates: 53.732°N 2.765°W

Hutton
- Shown within South Ribble Location within Lancashire
- Population: 2,277 (2011 Census)
- OS grid reference: SD490260
- Civil parish: Hutton
- District: South Ribble
- Shire county: Lancashire
- Region: North West
- Country: England
- Sovereign state: United Kingdom
- Post town: PRESTON
- Postcode district: PR4
- Dialling code: 01772
- Police: Lancashire
- Fire: Lancashire
- Ambulance: North West
- UK Parliament: South Ribble

Hutton is a village and civil parish in Lancashire, England. It is located 3 miles (4.8 km) south west of Preston, in the South Ribble borough and parliamentary constituency. The population of the civil parish at the 2011 census was 2,277.

== History ==
The village's name was variously recorded as Hoton in 1201, Hutton and Hooton in the 16th century. After the Norman Conquest Hutton was part of the Penwortham fee acquired by Roger son of Orm, (Roger de Hoton). Helias, (Ellis) the son of Roger de Hoton granted three carucates of land in "Hottun," in "Leylondeschire," without any reservation to Cockersand Abbey. He also made grants to Burscough Priory and Penwortham Priory. Lytham Priory had lands in the township. In about 1200 there was a chapel at a place called Ulvedene but nothing is known of its later history. Cockersand records from 1450 to 1537 show that the manor, its mills and a large part of the land were let to tenants. After the Dissolution in 1546 the manor was granted to Lawrence Rawstorne for £560 and descended through that family until the 20th century.

In the Hearth tax of 1666 there were 58 hearths to be taxed, the three largest houses had three hearths each. Hutton Hall was built in the 17th century and a free grammar school was built here.

The parish was part of Preston Rural District throughout its existence from 1894 to 1974. In 1974 the parish became part of South Ribble.

== Transport ==
The village is bypassed by the A59 Preston to Liverpool road, which gives the village good connections with Preston and Southport. The village once had a railway station on the Southport to Preston line, which shut in the 1960s. This station was known as New Longton and Hutton railway station. The station was situated in New Longton but served Hutton.

Stagecoach Cumbria and North Lancashire provides bus services to Preston, Southport and Liverpool.

== Geography ==
Hutton was a township of over 2,700 acres in the parish of Penwortham in the hundred of Leyland on the Ormskirk to Preston road. Much of the land is low lying on the south bank of the River Ribble and the village is situated to the east on land above the 50 feet level. The centre of the village is to the west of the A59 road and to the east is the location of the Lancashire Constabulary headquarters, which was built on the site of Hutton Hall.

== Landmarks ==
There are several old houses and farmhouses in Hutton, some of which are Listed buildings. They include Hutton Manor Farmhouse dated 1690 and Rawstorne House which was the parish workhouse of 1827 which has a plaque that states, "This Work House was erected in the year 1827 at the Expense of the Tax payers of the Township of Hutton. The Foundation & Area consisting of 1106 square yards. Given by Law Rawstorne Esq."

Hutton Grammar School is the most notable building in the village. The Hutton Police Headquarters on the eastern side of the A59 road at Hutton roundabout was built on the site of Hutton Hall. The hall's front gate posts remain in situ. The parkland is used as football pitches for the police headquarters.

== Education ==
Hutton Church of England Grammar School in the village has been in existence since the 16th century and is now a comprehensive school.

== Gallery ==
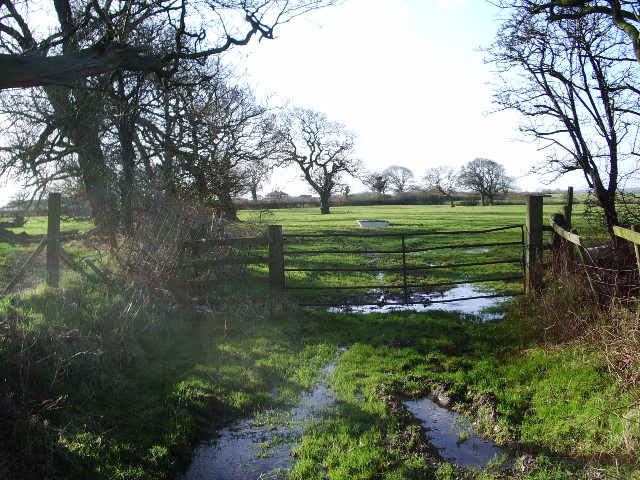
Track between Hutton and Penwortham

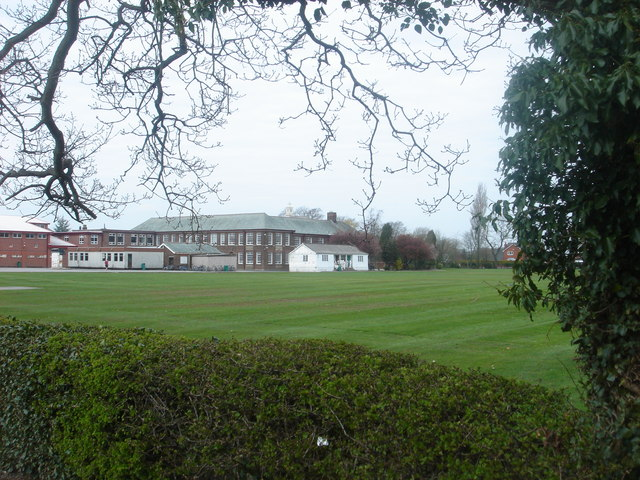
Hutton Grammar cricket field

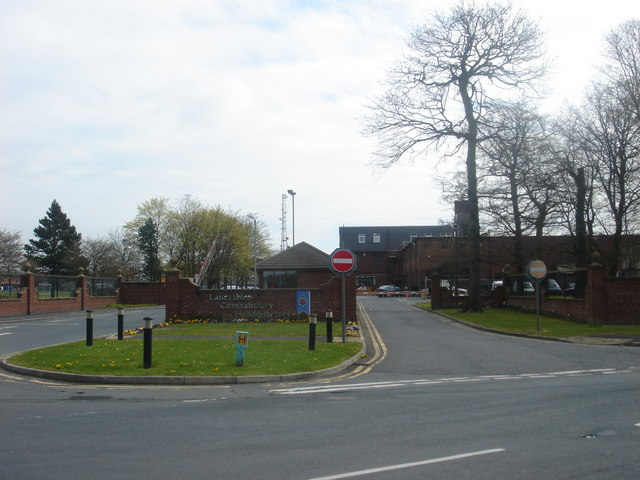
Lancashire Constabulary Headquarters

== See also ==
- Listed buildings in Hutton, Lancashire
