= E Raffles and Co. =

Defunct textile manufacturer

- Type: Private company
- Industry: Textiles
- Founder: Emanuel Raffles
- Defunct: 1980s
- Fate: Sold and closed
- Headquarters: Ancoats, Manchester, United Kingdom
- Products: Clothing and textile
- Owner: Raffles family
- Number of employees: 1,000 (1950s)

E. Raffles and Co. was a large clothing and textile factory in the mid-20th century in Ancoats, Manchester. Founded by Emanuel Raffles, it employed as many as one thousand workers. The factory occupied part of Brunswick Mill at 2 Bradford Road as well as the neighbouring EMKA Works towards Beswick Road (now mostly demolished). The Raffles family sold the business in the 1970s and it closed in the early 1980s.

== Organisation ==
Raffles had cutting rooms in the upper section of Brunswick Mill where the pattern cut cloth was fed by carousel and conveyor to the sewing rooms in the lower section of the adjacent building.

== Legacy ==
The kindness of Emanuel, known as 'Old Man Raffles' is mentioned in Jeanette Winterson's book Why Be Happy When You Could Be Normal?. The book also mentions the high quality of clothing produced at Raffles, enabling it to become the main supplier of raincoats to Marks & Spencer.

Emanuel Raffles was one of the founders of Manchester's Whitefield Golf Club in 1932, set up as a reaction to the antisemitism of most other golf clubs, open to Jews and non-Jews. His sons Ralph and Eric both worked at the factory. Ralph married the daughter of Marks & Spencer's Edward Sieff. He was appointed High Sheriff of Greater Manchester. Eric, an aviator, commuted between Heathrow and Manchester Ringway in the 1960s and early 1970s in his private aircraft.
