= Extended Project Qualification =

Educational qualification in England and Wales

Extended Project Qualification (EPQ) is a qualification taken by some students in England and Wales, which is equivalent to 50% of an A-level. Graded A*–E and worth up to 28 UCAS tariff points, it is part of level three of the national qualifications framework.

The extended project was devised by Sir Mike Tomlinson in 2006, during his review of 16- to 19-year-olds' education, and entered a pilot phase during the academic year 2007–8. It was a compulsory part of the 14–19 Diploma taken by students in England and Wales between 2008 and 2013.

== Description ==
All students may take an extended project as a free-standing qualification, this following a 2009 recommendation by the examination boards of England and Wales (Edexcel, OCR, AQA, WJEC, Eduqas and CIE), and England's former qualifications authority, the QCA. By introducing EPQs it was hoped that students would be better prepared for study at university or begin a career, by developing skills in research, problem solving, critical thinking, writing, and independent learning.

There are few restrictions on the topic a student chooses, but it must be approved by the supervisor or institution and it must demonstrate that it either derives from one of the student's study areas or from an area of personal interest to the student. It takes the form of either a dissertation (5,000 words being a common guideline) or a number of other forms: a musical or dramatical composition, report or artefact, backed up with paperwork. According to the QCA, an extended project is "a single piece of work requiring a high degree of planning, preparation, research, and autonomous working."

David MacKay, head of the 14–19 curriculum at the QCA, was in favour of EPQs, saying in 2009: "Extended projects can help students to develop and demonstrate a range of valuable skills through pursuing their interests and investigating topics in more depth." It has also been praised by universities for guiding students into higher education (typically universities). Some universities will give a reduced conditional offer to a student who is undertaking an EPQ, or will recognise the EPQ as demonstrating a strong interest in a certain area.

The EPQ is equivalent to half an A-level and is graded from A* to E. The UCAS points awarded for the EPQ correspond to these grades as follows:

- A* = 28 UCAS points
- A = 24 UCAS points
- B = 20 UCAS points
- C = 16 UCAS points
- D = 12 UCAS points
- E = 8 UCAS points

== Effect of the 2020 pandemic ==
In response to the COVID-19 pandemic, in the summer of 2020 EPQ grades were awarded according to assessments made by teachers.
