= Free-standing Mathematics Qualifications =

British educational qualification

Free-standing Mathematics Qualifications (FSMQ) are a suite of mathematical qualifications available at levels 1 to 3 in the National Qualifications Framework – Foundation, Intermediate and Advanced.

== Educational standard ==
They bridge a gap between GCSE and A-Level Mathematics. The advanced course is especially ideal for pupils who do not find GCSE maths particularly challenging and who often have extra time in their second year of GCSEs, having taken their Maths GCSE a year early. The qualification is commonly offered in private schools and is useful in allowing pupils to determine whether or not to pursue maths in subsequent stages of their schooling.

The highest grade achievable is an A. An FSMQ Unit at Advanced level is roughly equivalent to a single AS module with candidates receiving 12 UCAS points for an A grade. Intermediate level is equivalent to a GCSE in Mathematics. Coursework is often a key part of the FSMQ, but is sometimes omitted depending on the examining board.

== Exam boards ==
The only examining board currently offering FSMQs is OCR.

Edexcel withdrew the qualification, the last exam being held in June 2004. AQA also withdrew the pilot advanced level FSMQ, the last exam being in June 2018, and a final re-sit opportunity in June 2019.

== Examples ==
- Additional Mathematics/AdMaths (OCR) (No coursework)
