= Whitestake =

Village in Lancashire, England

Coordinates: 53.723°N 2.730°W

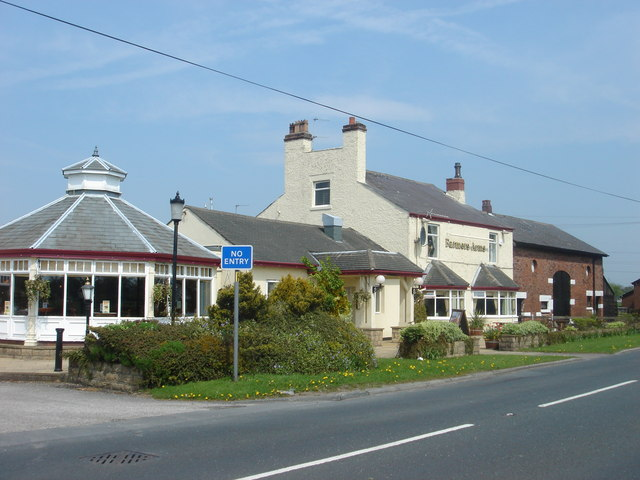
- The Farmers Arms public house, Whitestake

- Shown within South Ribble Location within Lancashire
- OS grid reference: SD518254
- Civil parish: Longton
- District: South Ribble
- Shire county: Lancashire
- Region: North West
- Country: England
- Sovereign state: United Kingdom
- Post town: PRESTON
- Postcode district: PR4
- Dialling code: 01772
- Police: Lancashire
- Fire: Lancashire
- Ambulance: North West
- UK Parliament: South Ribble

Whitestake is a small village in the South Ribble district of Lancashire, England, on the eastern edge of New Longton It is at the boundary of the parishes of Farington, Longton and Penwortham. It falls in what is called the "Western Parishes" area of South Ribble.

The name Whitestake supposedly originated because residents could stake a claim with a white stick so that their livestock could graze on the moss. This is said to have taken place once a year at the Farmers Arms Public House (still extant).

It is the site of the Turbary Woods Owl and Bird Sanctuary.
