= William Adam Hulton =

English antiquarian

- Born: 18 October 1802; Preston, Lancashire
- Died: 3 March 1887 (aged 84); Penwortham
- Occupations: Lawyer and antiquarian

William Adam Hulton (18 October 1802 – 3 March 1887) was an English lawyer and antiquarian.

== Biography ==
Hulton was the son of Lieutenant-colonel Henry Hulton. He was born at Preston, Lancashire, on 18 October 1802, and was educated at the Manchester grammar school. He entered the Middle Temple in 1822, and was called to the bar in 1827. From 1831 to 1849, he was treasurer of the county of Lancaster. On the establishment of the present county court system in 1847, he became judge of a circuit of county courts in Lancashire. He died at Hurst Grange, Penwortham, near Preston, on 3 March 1887. He married, in 1832, Dorothy Anne, daughter of Edward Gorst of Preston. Hulton wrote `A Treatise on the Law of Convictions,' 1835. He edited and printed with his own hands: 1. 'The Journal of [his brother] the late Jessop G. de B. Hulton from 1832 to 1836, with a Paper on the Kooree Mooree Islands,' Preston, 1844. 2. 'A Pedigree of the Hulton Family,' about 1847. 3. 'An Account of the Island of Socotra.' He joined the council of the Chetham Society in 1848, and edited two valuable works in their series of publications: 1. 'The Coucher Book, or Chartulary, of Whalley Abbey,' 1847–50, 4 vols. 2. 'Documents relating to the Priory of Penwortham, and other Possessions in Lancashire of the Abbey of Evesham,' 1853.
