= Josh Heaton =

English footballer (born 1996)

Personal information
- Date of birth: 16 September 1996 (age 30)
- Place of birth: Preston, England
- Height: 6 ft 5 in (1.96 m)
- Position: Defender

Team information
- Current team: Mornington SC

Youth career
- 200?–2014: Preston North End

Senior career*
Years	Team	Apps	(Gls)
2014–2016	Preston North End	0	(0)
2014–2015	→ Tamworth (loan)	23	(1)
2015–2016	→ Tamworth (loan)	3	(0)
2016	→ Colne (loan)	4	(0)
2016	Droylsden		
2016	Stalybridge Celtic	2	(0)
2016–2017	Bamber Bridge		
2017	→ Congleton Town (loan)	6	(2)
2017	Ramsbottom United	1	(1)
2017–2018	Darlington	22	(1)
2018–2019	St Mirren	0	(0)
2019	→ Kidderminster Harriers (loan)	8	(0)
2019	Darlington	7	(0)
2019	Bradford (Park Avenue)	6	(0)
2019–2020	Longridge Town	12	(0)
2020–	Mornington SC		
- * Club domestic league appearances and goals as of 09:17, 23 April 2020 (UTC)

Joshua Heaton (born 16 September 1996), formerly known as Josh Sampson, is an English footballer who plays as a defender for Australian club Mornington SC. He began his career with Preston North End, but never appeared for their first team, and played non-league football for Tamworth, Colne, Droylsden, Stalybridge Celtic, Bamber Bridge, Congleton Town, Ramsbottom United and Darlington, before signing for Scottish Premiership club St Mirren in 2018. After spending time on loan at Kidderminster Harriers, he was released by St Mirren, and signed for Bradford (Park Avenue) in September 2019 after a short second spell with Darlington. He also played for Longridge Town before moving to Australia.

== Life and career ==
=== Preston North End ===
Heaton was born in Preston, Lancashire, and attended All Hallows Catholic High School in nearby Penwortham. He first played for his local Football League club, Preston North End, as an under-seven, signed for them as an under-eight, and progressed through the ranks, taking up a two-year scholarship in 2013.

In November 2014, he joined Tamworth of the Conference North on a work experience loan. Because of injuries and suspensions, he went straight into the starting eleven for the visit to Lowestoft Town the following day, and played the whole of a 3–2 defeat. He established himself as a regular in the side, and finished the season with 22 league starts.

After his scholarship ended in June 2015, Heaton was the only one of his year group to be taken on as a professional: he signed a one-year contract with the option of a second. He was given squad number 29, and was included among the substitutes for the visit to Sheffield Wednesday in October; Preston lost 3–1, and Heaton remained unused. In November, he rejoined Tamworth on loan, but this time he made only four appearances over a two-month spell. He finished the season on loan at Colne of the North-West Counties League. He was sent off on his debut, conceding a penalty that tied the scores in the local derby against Barnoldswick Town, but his team went on to win. He contributed three more league appearances as the team gained promotion to the Northern Premier League. Heaton was released by Preston in the summer of 2016 when his contract expired.

=== Non-league football ===
After interest from Championship clubs Reading and Wigan Athletic and trials with non-league teams including AFC Fylde and Bamber Bridge, Heaton signed for Droylsden of the Northern Premier League Division One North. He soon moved up two tiers to Stalybridge Celtic of the National League North, but made just two appearances at that level before returning to the NPL Division One with Bamber Bridge. By the end of the season he had been on the winning side in the Challenge Cup final and earned himself a new one-year contract.

In the summer of 2017, he agreed to join National League North club Darlington, but the move collapsed over personal terms, complicated by a collarbone broken while playing in a pre-season fixture for his potential employers. He remained a Bamber Bridge player, and spent a month on loan at Congleton Town to regain match fitness. Released by Bamber Bridge in mid-October, he then played three matches for Northern Premier League Division One team Ramsbottom United on a non-contract basis, before finally joining Darlington in mid-November.

Although happy in his work as a delivery driver, Heaton was open about his ambition to return to full-time football as soon as possible, and hoped that Darlington was "the right move for me to hopefully help me progress". Initially, he was seen as a work in progress: Darlington's management team, Tommy Wright and former centre-back Alan White, told him "You'll not play regularly but you'll get your chance, you'll be involved". By February, he had established himself as a regular in Darlington's starting eleven, and in March, he signed a new two-year contract "to give him the wage improvement that he deserves". He finished the season with 22 league appearances.

=== St Mirren ===
Together with Darlington teammates Luke Trotman and Joe Wheatley, Heaton was selected to attend a course at Jamie Vardy's V9 Academy designed to help non-league players get into professional football. He attracted attention from a variety of clubs including Everton and Middlesbrough before manager Alan Stubbs signed Heaton and another player from the V9 Academy course, Cody Cooke, for Scottish Premiership club St Mirren. Heaton signed a three-year contract; the fee, officially undisclosed but reported in the media as £75,000, was described on the club's website as the largest paid by St Mirren "in around 25 years".

Heaton was an unused substitute for St Mirren's opening fixture, in the League Cup against Kilmarnock, and made his debut in their second group match, at home to Spartans of the Lowland League on 17 July. He played the whole match as St Mirren won on penalties. He made one more appearance in the League Cup and turned out for St Mirren's under-21 side in the Scottish Challenge Cup, but four selections as an unused substitute were as close as he came to a Premiership debut.

He returned to English football in January 2019 when he signed for Kidderminster Harriers on loan until the end of the season, but made only eight National League North appearances. He was released by St Mirren in July 2019.

=== Return to non-league football ===
Heaton rejoined Darlington on a non-contract basis in August 2019. He played seven times in the National League North, mostly as a substitute with Louis Laing and Terry Galbraith preferred at centre back. Standing in for the unfit Galbraith away to King's Lynn Town at the end of August, he made defensive errors that contributed to both goals in a 2–0 defeat, and was allowed to leave after just five weeks with the club. He signed for Bradford (Park Avenue) on 13 September, and made his debut the following day in a 1–1 draw at home to Spennymoor United in the National League North. After two months and six league appearances, he joined Longridge Town of the North West Counties League, where he played until February 2020.

Heaton then moved to Australia, where he played for Mornington SC of the Victorian State League Division 1 in an FFA Cup match before the COVID-19 pandemic put a stop to competitive football.

== Career statistics ==
As of match played 8 February 2020

Appearances and goals by club, season and competition
Club	Season	League			National Cup		League Cup		Other		Total	
Club	Season	Division	Apps	Goals	Apps	Goals	Apps	Goals	Apps	Goals	Apps	Goals
Preston North End	2014–15	Championship	0	0	0	0	0	0	—		0	0
Preston North End	2015–16	Championship	0	0	0	0	0	0	—		0	0
Preston North End	Total		0	0	0	0	0	0	—		0	0
Tamworth (loan)	2014–15	Conference North	23	1	—		—		1 (Note: Appearance(s) in FA Trophy)	0	24	1
Tamworth (loan)	2015–16	Conference North	3	0	0	0	—		1	0	4	0
Tamworth (loan)	Total		26	1	0	0	—		2	0	28	1
Colne (loan)	2015–16	North West Counties Premier	4	0	—		—		—		4	0
Stalybridge Celtic	2016–17	Northern Premier League Div. One North	2	0	—		—		1 (Note: Appearance in Cheshire Senior Cup)	1	3	1
Bamber Bridge	2016–17	Northern Premier League Div. One North										
Congleton Town (loan)	2017–18	North West Counties Premier	6	2	—		—		0	0	6	2
Ramsbottom United	2017–18	Northern Premier League Div. One North	1	1	—		—		2	1	3	2
Darlington	2017–18	National League North	22	1	—		—		—		22	1
St Mirren	2018–19	Scottish Premiership	0	0	0	0	2	0	—		2	0
St Mirren U21	2018–19	—			—		—		1 (Note: Appearance in Scottish Challenge Cup)	0	1	0
Kidderminster Harriers (loan)	2018–19	National League North	8	0	—		—		—		8	0
Darlington	2019–20	National League North	7	0	—		—		—		7	0
Bradford (Park Avenue)	2019–20	National League North	6	0	1	0	—		—		7	0
Longridge Town	2019–20	North West Counties Premier	12	0	—		—		4 (Note: Appearances in FA Vase)	0	16	0
Career total			94	5	1	0	2	0	10	2	107	7
