= Listed buildings in Penwortham =

Penwortham is a civil parish in the South Ribble district of Lancashire, England. It contains 12 buildings that are recorded in the National Heritage List for England as designated listed buildings. Of these, one is listed at Grade II*, the middle grade, and the others are at Grade II, the lowest grade. The parish contains the town of Penwortham and surrounding countryside. The listed buildings include a medieval wayside cross, a church and structures in the churchyard, houses of varying dates, an inn, and a railway viaduct carrying the West Coast Main Line over the River Ribble.

== Key ==
Grade	Criteria
II*	Particularly important buildings of more than special interest
II	Buildings of national importance and special interest

== Buildings ==
Name and location	Photograph	Date	Notes	Grade
Howick Cross; 53.74222°N 2.74719°W		Medieval (probable)	The wayside cross was restored in 1919, The only original part is the base that consists of a roughly cube-shaped block 75 centimetres (30 in) wide by 60 centimetres (24 in) deep. This stands on an inscribed stone plinth, and carries a cross 1 metre (3 ft 3 in) high.	II
St Mary's Church; 53.75523°N 2.72346°W		Early 14th century	The oldest part of the church is the chancel. The west tower was added in the 15th century, and the nave and aisles were replaced in 1855–56 by E. G. Paley. The church is built in stone, and has a slate roof. The tower has diagonal buttresses, a west doorway, a window with Perpendicular tracery, an ogee-headed niche with crocketed pinnacles, and an embattled parapet with angle pinnacles.	II*
Ivy Cottage; 53.75101°N 2.72921°W	—	Late 17th century	Originally a farmhouse, possibly timber-framed, the house is now in roughcast brick with a composition tile roof, and has 1 1/2 storeys. The original doorway is now covered by a modern wing (which is not included in the listing). The windows in the front are modern, mainly casements, two of them in dormers, and a bow window. At the rear is a six-light mullioned window.	II
Stone slab 53.75530°N 2.72322°W	—	1682	The slab is in the churchyard of St Mary's Church and commemorates Peter Taylor. It is rectangular on a stone base, and contains an inscription in raised capital letters filling the entire surface.	II
Gravestone; 53.75516°N 2.72308°W	—	1686	The gravestone is in the churchyard of St Mary's Church and commemorates Edward Hollinhurst. It consists of a rectangular stone slab on two rectangular stones, and is inscribed in raised capital letters.	II
Hesketh Farmhouse; 53.74604°N 2.76104°W	—	1700 or earlier	A brick house with a roof of slate and some stone-slate. It has two storeys with attics, and has a T-shaped plan with a main range with a cross wing on the right. The doorway has a segmental head, and above it is a datestone. The windows are casements, a;so with segmental heads. In the cross wing is a stairlight window, and there is a blocked doorway and blocked windows, some with 17th-century-type hood moulds.	II
Fleece Inn and cottage 53.74980°N 2.73075°W		Early 18th century	The inn is the oldest part, with a cottage and a workshop added to the right later in the century. The whole building is in roughcast brick with slate roofs, it has two storeys, and a front of nine bays. The inn has five bays; in the first bay is a gabled dormer, and the second bay contains a doorway flanked by quoins. There are five three-light casement windows on each floor, those in the ground floor having wavy heads. The cottage has a central door and sash windows, and the workshop has a square window and altered windows on the front and a wagon entrance at the rear.	II
Middleforth Hall; 53.74076°N 2.70260°W	—	Early 18th century	A farmhouse in rendered brick with stone dressings and a slate roof. There are two storeys with an attic. The doorway has stone jambs, a stone lintel, and a rectangular fanlight. There are four windows in the ground floor and three above, all sashes. At the rear is an outshut and a stairlight window.	II
Penwortham Hall and Lodge; 53.73933°N 2.71170°W		1801	The house was built for John Horrocks, extended later in the 19th century, and converted into flats in the late 20th century. The original part is in ashlar with a hipped slate roof. It has two storeys with a basement, and a square plan with fronts of five bays that have a moulded cornice, and a parapet. The symmetrical west front has a porch with Ionic columns, an entablature with a dentilled and moulded cornice and a parapet. The doorway has margin lights flanked by columns and pilasters, and an elliptical fanlight. The extension to the south is in brick, with three storeys and a basement, and has a three-bay front. The entrance has a pedimented doorcase and a fanlight. Most of the windows in both parts are sashes.	II
Tomb chest 53.75513°N 2.72316°W		1814	The tomb chest is in the churchyard of St Mary's Church. It commemorates John Horrocks, Member of parliament and cotton manufacturer, and members of his family. The tomb chest is in a rectangular enclosure surrounded by cast iron railings with urn finials.	II
Sundial; 53.75512°N 2.72359°W		1815	The sundial is in the churchyard of St Mary's Church. It consists of two circular steps, a square plinth, and an octagonal column with a circular moulded capital and top. On the top is an inscribed brass plate and an openwork gnomon.	II
Railway viaduct 53.74993°N 2.70621°W		1837–38	The viaduct carries the railway over the River Ribble. It was built for the North Union Railway Company, doubled in width in 1879–80, and now carries the West Coast Main Line. The viaduct is in sandstone, is approximately 200 metres (660 ft) long, and has five segmental arches with rusticated voussoirs. Along the top is a moulded cornice and a plain parapet.	II
