= Howick Cross =

Hamlet in Lancashire, England

Coordinates: 53.743°N 2.749°W

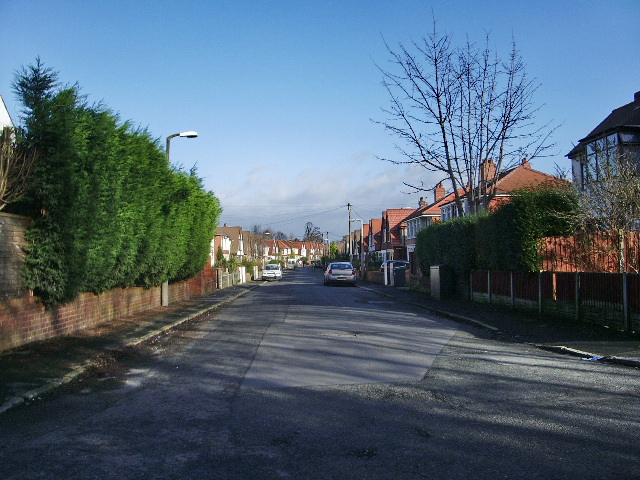
- Howick Park Drive, Howick Cross

- Shown within South Ribble Location within Lancashire
- Population: 354 (2001 Census)
- OS grid reference: SD506276
- Civil parish: Penwortham
- District: South Ribble
- Shire county: Lancashire
- Region: North West
- Country: England
- Sovereign state: United Kingdom
- Post town: PRESTON
- Postcode district: PR1
- Dialling code: 01772
- Police: Lancashire
- Fire: Lancashire
- Ambulance: North West
- UK Parliament: South Ribble

Howick Cross is a landmark and small hamlet in Penwortham, South Ribble, Lancashire, England. It is located just over 2 miles south west of the city of Preston. The hamlet is predominantly made up of a small community, a primary school, various farms and an electrical substation. The community had a population of 354 people in 2001.

The wayside cross, probably medieval, was restored 1919. Only the base is original, a roughly hewn cube-shaped block 75 cm wide and 60 cm deep; this stands on stone plinth which has an inscription stating that it was restored to commemorate peace, 1919; and it carries a cross 1 metre high. (Henry Taylor Ancient Crosses and Holy Wells 1906.

It is located near the village of Hutton. Other nearby communities include the village of New Longton.

Howick was a civil parish from 1866 until 1 April 1934, when it was absorbed into the parish of Penwortham. Howick parish was part of Preston Rural District. The former parish name survives in Howick C E School, the Hutton and Howick Women's Institute (the oldest in Lancashire, founded by suffragette Edith Rigby) and the former railway station.

Hutton and Howick railway station opened on 1 December 1897, on the Preston to Southport railway line. It was renamed New Longton and Hutton on 3 November 1934 and closed, along with the line, on 7 September 1964.
