= Longton, Lancashire =

Village in Lancashire, England

Coordinates: 53.729°N 2.797°W

Longton
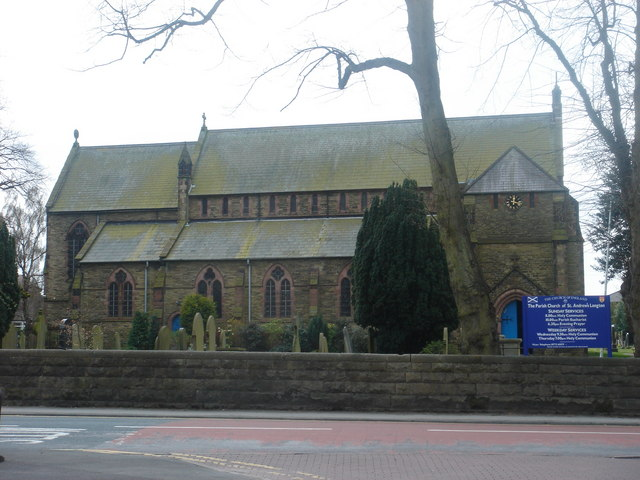
- St Andrew's Church

- Shown within South Ribble Location within Lancashire
- Population: 7,752 (2021)
- OS grid reference: SD475262
- Civil parish: Longton
- District: South Ribble
- Shire county: Lancashire
- Region: North West
- Country: England
- Sovereign state: United Kingdom
- Post town: PRESTON
- Postcode district: PR4
- Dialling code: 01772
- Police: Lancashire
- Fire: Lancashire
- Ambulance: North West
- UK Parliament: South Ribble

Longton is a village and civil parish in the west of the borough of South Ribble, Lancashire, England. It is about 4 miles to the south west of Preston. The population of the civil parish, which also includes the village of New Longton, was 5,500 at the 2001 Census increasing to 7,652 at the 2011 Census. In 2021 Census it increased again to 7,752.

== History ==
Longton is a village of ancient origin. The parish church, St. Andrew's was completed in 1887 when the previous chapel of 1772 which stood nearer the main road was demolished. This stood on the site of an earlier chapel, the records of which are lost.

Although a document refers to "Eafward Priest of Longton" as early as 1153, and there is evidence of a chapel in Longton just before the reformation in 1517, when William Walton endowed a chantry at the chapel, there is no evidence that it stood on or near the site of the present parish church. No archaeological evidence has ever been found on the current site, and the dedication of the early chapel is unknown.

During the Middle Ages, Longton was known as "a sort of Holy Land" because the monks of Penwortham Priory tended their lands here. It was no doubt the monks who established the first chapel here. Many mediaeval documents survive which are mostly concerning rents paid to the Shireburn Family of Stonyhurst. An old source mentions a meadow called "Tirolkar" which bears a remarkable resemblance to the "Hallcar" of today.

The parish was part of Preston Rural District throughout its existence from 1894 to 1974. In 1974 the parish became part of South Ribble.

== Religion ==
Apart from St. Andrew's Church, the Anglican church on Liverpool Road, there is a Methodist Chapel called Longton Methodist Church and the Catholic church of St. Oswald on Chapel Lane.

A small, plain Wesleyan chapel was built in Marsh Lane in 1807 and enlarged in 1833. In 1872 a new chapel was built in the Early English style.

By 1837 the Primitive Methodists had become so numerous that they opened a chapel down Chapel Lane, but as time went on they declined and the chapel was converted into a small housing estate.

Despite the successful application for a licence to build a Congregational Chapel in 1821, it never got built.

St. Oswald's Catholic Church was established in 1893 and on 16 October 1894 a chapel and school was opened, entirely funded by the wealthy Liverpool priest, Canon Lennon. By 1965, the congregation had vastly increased and a new church was built on an adjacent site.

== Demographics ==
The population of the civil parish, as of 2022 mid year estimates, is 7,900.

97.5% of the population are White as of the 2021 Census, which is greater than the 81% seen in England and Wales. In terms of national identity, 97.6% identify as having one or more UK identity only. 71.9% are Christian and 22.5% identify as 'No religion'.

In terms of age, Longton has a lower percentage of people aged 0 to 49, and a higher percentage of people aged 50+, when compared with England.

== Places of interest ==
Longton Brickcroft is a former brickworks which has been transformed into a nature reserve and public open space. It was declared a Local Nature Reserve by South Ribble Borough Council in 1998. The environment has been made extremely attractive, dominated by water which has filled the former clay pits. One of the water areas is available for fishing. The areas surrounding the water have been allowed to develop naturally with trees, shrubbery and wild plants.

The Brickcroft is of particular interest to birdwatchers and botanists with seating and footpaths making it accessible for most visitors. A purpose built visitor centre contains informative displays on the site's history, local wildlife and the environment. Facilities include toilets with disabled and baby changing provision, car parking and a picnic area.

The long-distance footpath the Ribble Way starts by The Dolphin Inn in Longton.

== Fallout shelter ==
A small UKWMO nuclear observation bunker can be found to the north-west of the village on Back Lane. Its position is concealed as it is located on a private field, and as such it is relatively unknown among villagers.

== Architecture ==
Most houses in Longton are semi-detached, detached, bungalows or homes that are part of modern housing estates. About 70% of accommodation in Longton was built in the 1960s and 1970s, but more modern developments have been constructed.

There is only one area of council housing in the village; it is in West and East Square and it is well maintained.

== Education ==
=== Primary schools ===
Longton is home to two primary schools. There is a Catholic school on Chapel Lane called St. Oswald's. The majority of children in the village go to Longton Primary School in School Lane.

=== High schools ===
Most students from the village, after primary school go to the surrounding high schools. These include Hutton Grammar School, Penwortham Girls' High School, All Hallows Catholic High School and Penwortham Priory Academy. Bishop Rawstorne Church of England Academy and, Tarleton High School also takes in a few people each term also, as does Bolton School and Kirkham Grammar School.

== Scouts and Girlguiding ==
Longton has a Scouts division, a small building across from Booths on Liverpool Road, next to St. Andrew's Church Hall. It has all 3 major stages, from Beavers to Cubs to Scouts. The neckerchief colours are blue and white. Longton also has a Girlguiding division. Based in the Church Hall, it has 2 of the major stages: Brownies and Guides.

== Longton Marsh ==
Longton Marshes are a large area of marshland to the west of Longton lying at the confluence of the Rivers Douglas and Ribble which is now part of the Ribble Link. It is the natural home for a large variety of visiting and indigenous wildfowl. The 70 mile Ribble Way footpath starts at the Dolphin Inn, once owned by the Holmes family, on the edge of the marsh and follows its edge before joining the Ribble.

== Transport ==
=== Railway ===
In 1882 the West Lancashire Railway came to the village. Longton Bridge railway station was aimed at opening the village up to the local economic hubs of Preston and Southport, but the placement of the station in relation to the village was too far. The line closed in 1964. While some of the line's earth bankings and bridge foundations are still visible on Liverpool Road, much of the track has been built over.

=== Road ===
The A59 road passes to the east of the village and is known as "Longton Bypass". On the A59 there is a bridge over a road that connects Longton to New Longton. This bridge was originally constructed to take the Longton Bypass over the railway line between Preston and Southport, and was adapted to road use after the line's closure. The central reservation on the A59 dual carriageway was then made continuous to prevent traffic from crossing four lanes of fast-moving traffic. The poor visibility to the south, because of the alignment necessary to take the highway over the railway bridge, had made crossing the A59 very dangerous at this location.

=== Bus ===
Bus routes for the village are run by Stagecoach Cumbria and North Lancashire or Vision Bus.

== People ==
The following is a list of notable people from Longton:

- Nick Park, inventor and creator of plasticine stop motion characters Wallace and Gromit (from neighbouring village Walmer Bridge).

== Gallery ==
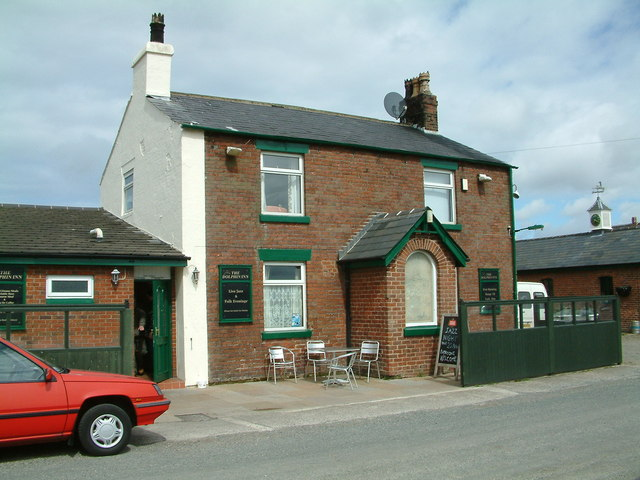
The Dolphin Inn (Flying Fish)

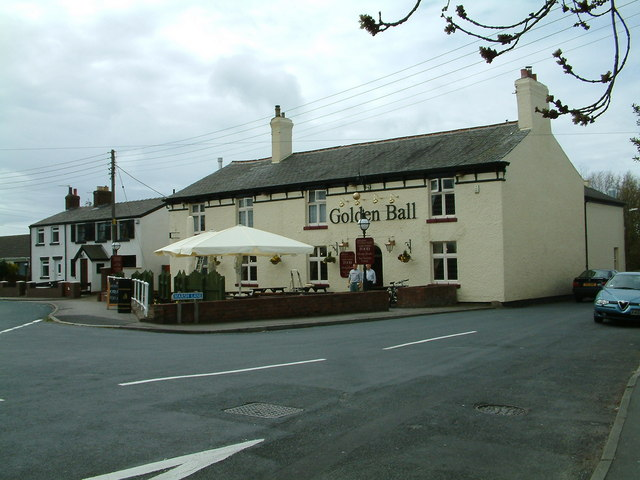
The Golden Ball

== See also ==
- Listed buildings in Longton, Lancashire
