= St Mary's Church, Penwortham =

Coordinates: 53.7552°N 2.7234°W

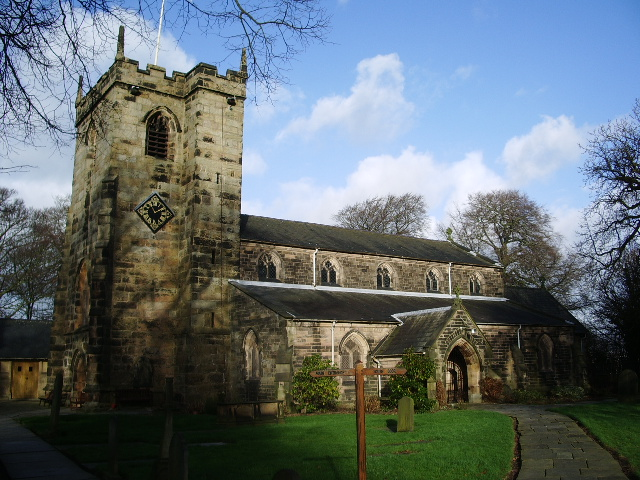
- St Mary's Church, Penwortham, from the southwest

- Location in the Borough of South Ribble
- OS grid reference: SD 524,290
- Location: Church Avenue, Penwortham, Lancashire
- Country: England
- Denomination: Anglican
- Website: St Mary, Penwortham

History
- Status: Parish church

Architecture
- Functional status: Active
- Heritage designation: Grade II*
- Designated: 11 November 1966
- Architect(s): E. G. Paley (rebuilding of nave and aisles)
- Architectural type: Church
- Style: Gothic, Gothic Revival

Specifications
- Materials: Stone, slate roof

Administration
- Province: York
- Diocese: Blackburn
- Archdeaconry: Blackburn
- Deanery: Leyland
- Parish: Penwortham

Clergy
- Vicar: Revd Chris Nelson

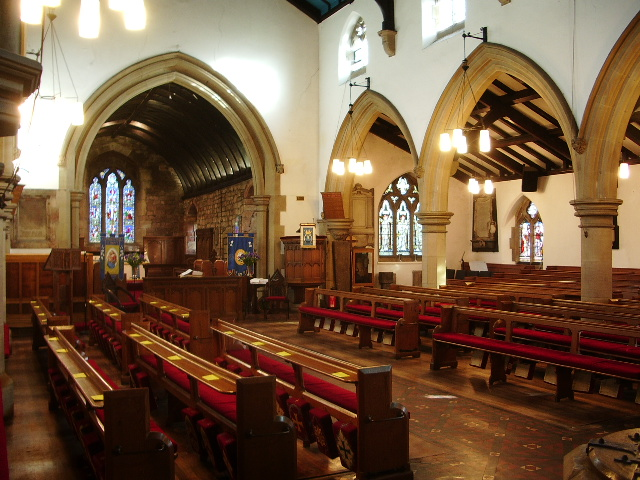
The nave in 2008, before re-ordering

St Mary's Church is in Church Avenue, Penwortham, Lancashire, England. It is an active Anglican parish church in the deanery of Leyland, the archdeaconry of Blackburn, and the diocese of Blackburn. The church is recorded in the National Heritage List for England as a designated Grade II* listed building.

== History ==
The oldest part of the church is the chancel which dates from the 14th century. The west tower was built in the 15th century. The nave and aisles were rebuilt in 1855–56 by the Lancaster architect E. G. Paley. As part of the restoration the roof was raised, and the north and west galleries were removed. Between 2009 and 2011 the church was reordered, under-floor heating was installed, and the pews were replaced by chairs.

== Architecture ==
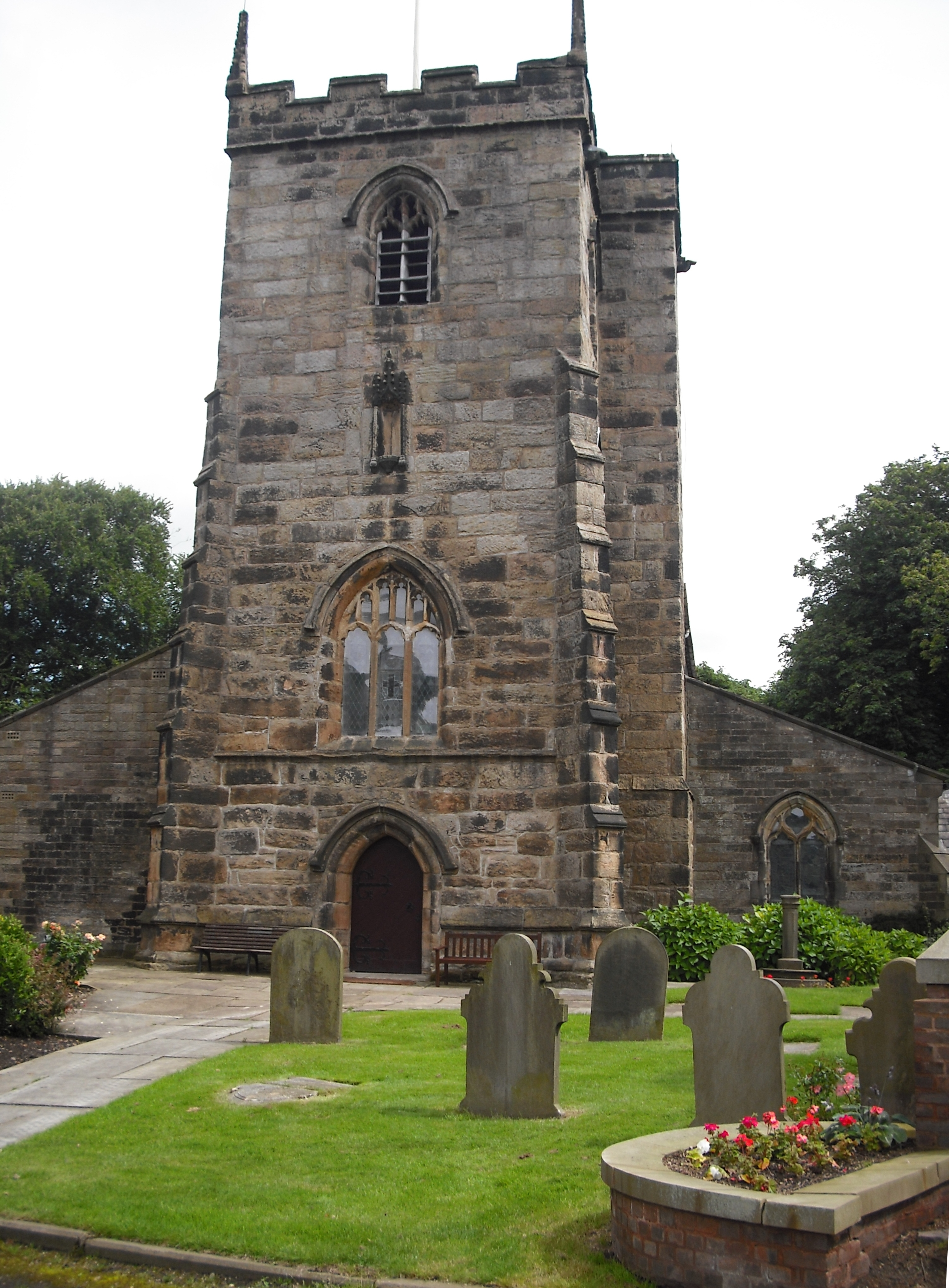
St Mary's Church 15th-century tower

=== Exterior ===
St Mary's is constructed in stone and has a slate roof. Its plan consists of a four-bay nave with north and south aisles, a south porch, a chancel, and a west tower. The tower has diagonal buttresses and a battlemented parapet with pinnacles. On its west side is a doorway, above which is a three-light window with Perpendicular tracery. Over the window is a niche with an ogee head and crocketed pinnacles. The bell openings have two lights and are louvred. On the sides of the nave are five two-light windows. There is a blocked priest's door in the south wall of the chancel, above which is a stone inscribed with the date 1653.

=== Interior ===
==== Features ====
Inside the church, the arcades are carried on alternate round and octagonal piers. An ancient font inscribed "T.R. 1667", stood in the church until the 19th century. In the 18th century, this font was replaced by a marble font, with a Latin inscription, indicating that it was gifted by H. Fleetwood in 1725. The current font is octagonal and of Caen stone and was given in 1856 by a Churchwarden, Mr Norris who requested the 1667 font for use in his garden. The Fleetwood font was moved to the cellar of the Old Chapel at Longton, and in 1886 it was transferred to the present Church of St. Andrew's in 1886. The 1667 font was offered for auction in 1872, but was not sold and instead taken to the auctioneer's house in Preston. It later passed to local antiquarian, T. H. Myers of Ashton-on-Ribble who restored it to Penwortham Church in 1906.

The memorial tablets include one to the cotton manufacturer and politician John Horrocks who died in 1804 and who was buried in a railed tomb behind the church. There are fragments of early stained glass in the chancel windows. Before the reordering of 2009–11 there were box pews of 1855 in the church, those in the aisles being arranged to face the centre of the church, rather than to the east end. The organ is in the west gallery, and was installed there in 1959 by Jardines of Manchester. The tower contains eight bells, all of which were cast in 1965 by Mears & Stainbank at the Whitechapel Bell Foundry replacing an earlier octave comprising bells cast in 1712, 1891 and 1926.

==== Recent re-ordering ====
Between 2009 and 2011 the church interior underwent significant re-ordering to install underfloor heating, as the old oil-fired boiler and associated hot water pipes were in a poor state of repair. The work involved the excavation of the entire floor in both nave and chancel, to allow installation of the new heating matrix. Before this could be done all fixtures and fittings, including pews, pulpit and choir stalls, were also removed. It was discovered, during excavation, that during the 19th century the nave had been extended to allow more room for the increasing population of Penwortham. The enlarged area extended over graves some of which were collapsed graves which and thus threatened to undermine the new floor foundations. Three crypts, containing the mortal remains of parishioners buried before 1856, were also discovered and were investigated by an archaeological team. Skeletal remains were removed for examination and were eventually re-interred in the largest of the crypts before the new floor was laid. The crypts had lain undiscovered since the destruction of records in a fire of 1856.

To overcome the problem of collapsed graves in the nave, piling and concrete frames were installed to support the new floor. The heating matrix was installed and covered by stone flags. All of the flooring, both in the nave and the chancel, is now on one level. The pews were replaced by chairs and the church now has a light and airy interior, which allows more flexibility of use. During the re-ordering services were held in St. Mary's Church Hall on Cop Lane in the town. Following completion of the work a service of celebration was held on 19 June 2012.

== External features ==
In the churchyard are four structures that have been designated as Grade II listed buildings. One of these is a gravestone dated 1682, and another is a gravestone dated 1686. To the south of the church is a sundial dated 1815. John Horrocks has a second memorial, this being his tomb chest in the churchyard which is also a memorial to other members of his family. The tomb is Grade II listed. The churchyard also contains the war graves of nine service personnel of World War I, and 13 of World War II.

== See also ==
- Grade II* listed buildings in Lancashire
- Listed buildings in Penwortham
- List of works by Sharpe and Paley
