= New Longton and Hutton railway station =

Disused railway station in New Longton, Lancashire

New Longton and Hutton

General information
- Location: South Ribble, Lancashire; England
- Coordinates: 53.7265°N 2.7472°W
- Platforms: 2

Other information
- Status: Disused

History
- Original company: West Lancashire Railway
- Pre-grouping: Lancashire and Yorkshire Railway
- Post-grouping: London, Midland and Scottish Railway

Key dates
- 1 June 1889: Opened as Howick
- 1 December 1897: Renamed to Hutton and Howick
- 5 November 1934: Renamed New Longton and Hutton
- 6 April 1964: Closed to goods
- 7 September 1964: Closed to passengers
Location

New Longton and Hutton station was a railway station on the West Lancashire Railway in England. It was over a mile from each of the villages of Hutton and Howick Cross.

== History ==
The station was opened as Howick on 1 June 1889 as an intermediate station on the West Lancashire Railway (WLR) between Longton Bridge and Preston Fishergate Hill. The station was renamed Hutton and Howick on 1 December 1897 by the Lancashire and Yorkshire Railway (L&YR) and renamed again to New Longton and Hutton by the London, Midland and Scottish Railway on 5 October 1934.

The station was located where Chapel Lane crossed the railway using a level crossing, immediately turned through 90° and became Station Road.

There were two platforms, one each side of the running lines, the station building was on the north side of the tracks adjacent to the level crossing. Both platforms were accessed from the level crosssing, they both had waiting shelters. There was a signal box on the opposite side of the road that the crossing controlled.

The coming of the railway attracted a settlement around the station which grew into the village of New Longton. The rapid growth of this village was the reason why the station was renamed.

The station closed to goods traffic on 6 April 1964 and to passengers on 7 September 1964 when the line closed. Around 1966 the tracks were lifted, and the buildings were pulled down soon after the station had been closed.

| Preceding station | Disused railways | Following station |
|---|---|---|
| Longton Bridge towards Southport | West Lancashire Railway | Penwortham Cop Lane towards Preston |

== Bibliography ==
- Clinker, C. R. (October 1978). Clinker's Register of Closed Passenger Stations and Goods Depots in England, Scotland and Wales 1830–1977. Bristol: Avon-Anglia Publications & Services. ISBN 0-905466-19-5. OCLC 5726624.
- Cotterall, J.E. (1982). The West Lancashire Railway. Oakwood.
- Hindle, David John (2022). Lament for a Branch Line: The Preston to Southport Railway (2nd Enlarged ed.). Silver Link Books. ISBN 978 1 85794 609 3.
- Hurst, Geoffrey (1992). Register of Closed Railways: 1948-1991. Worksop, Nottinghamshire: Milepost Publications. ISBN 0-9477-9618-5.
- Quick, Michael (2023) [2001]. Railway passenger stations in Great Britain: a chronology (PDF). version 5.05. Railway & Canal Historical Society.
- The Railway Clearing House (1970) [1904]. The Railway Clearing House Handbook of Railway Stations 1904 (1970 D&C Reprint ed.). Newton Abbot: David & Charles Reprints. ISBN 0-7153-5120-6.
