= Listed buildings in Longton, Lancashire =

Longton is a civil parish in the South Ribble district of Lancashire, England. It contains five listed buildings that are recorded in the National Heritage List for England. All of the listed buildings are designated at Grade II, the lowest of the three grades, which is applied to "buildings of national importance and special interest". The parish contains the village of Longton, and is otherwise rural. All of the listed buildings are houses, four of them being, or originating as, farmhouses.

== Buildings ==
Name and location	Photograph	Date	Notes
Balshaws Farmhouse; 53.71754°N 2.77280°W	—	17th century	The farmhouse is in rendered brick on a low stone base, with some quoins, and it has a slate roof with red ridge tiles. There are two storeys and 2 1/2 bays, with an outshut at the rear. There is a single-story porch with a pitched roof at the left side, and a modern doorway at the rear. Some of the windows are sliding sashes, and others are casements. Inside the farmhouse is an inglenook and a bressumer.
Tuson's Farmhouse; 53.72557°N 2.79961°W	—	17th century	A brick house, partly rendered and partly painted, with a slate roof. It has two storeys and two bays, and there is a single-storey extension at the rear. In the centre of the front is a gabled porch containing side benches, and the windows are casements. Inside the house is an inglenook and a bressumer.
Longton Hall Farmhouse; 53.72454°N 2.77819°W	—	1662	The farmhouse has been much renovated externally. It is in brick, with dressings in stone and concrete, and has a slate roof. There are two storeys and three bays, the first bay being wider and forming a projecting cross wing. In the middle bay is a two-storey gabled porch with a datestone above. All the windows have been altered. Inside the farmhouse are two bressumers.
Marsh House; 53.72603°N 2.80208°W	—	Late 17th century (probable)	The house was altered and extended in the late 19th or early 20th century. It is in rendered and whitewashed brick, it has slate roofs, and is in two storeys. The original part has two bays, and the extension to the left is taller. The two-storey porch and all the openings on the front date from the later alterations. At the rear the windows include sliding sashes. Inside the house are an inglenook, a bressumer, a timber-framed partition, and blocked mullioned windows.
Chestnut House; 53.72678°N 2.78644°W	—	Early 19th century	A brick house with stone dressings and a slate roof in two storeys, and in Georgian style. It has a symmetrical two-bay front, the centre bay projecting slightly forwards. At the rear is a narrow two-storey extension. The central doorway has a porch with Ionic pilasters, an entablature, and a rectangular fanlight. All the windows are sashes with splayed heads.
