= Penwortham Cop Lane railway station =

Former railway station in England

Penwortham Cop Lane
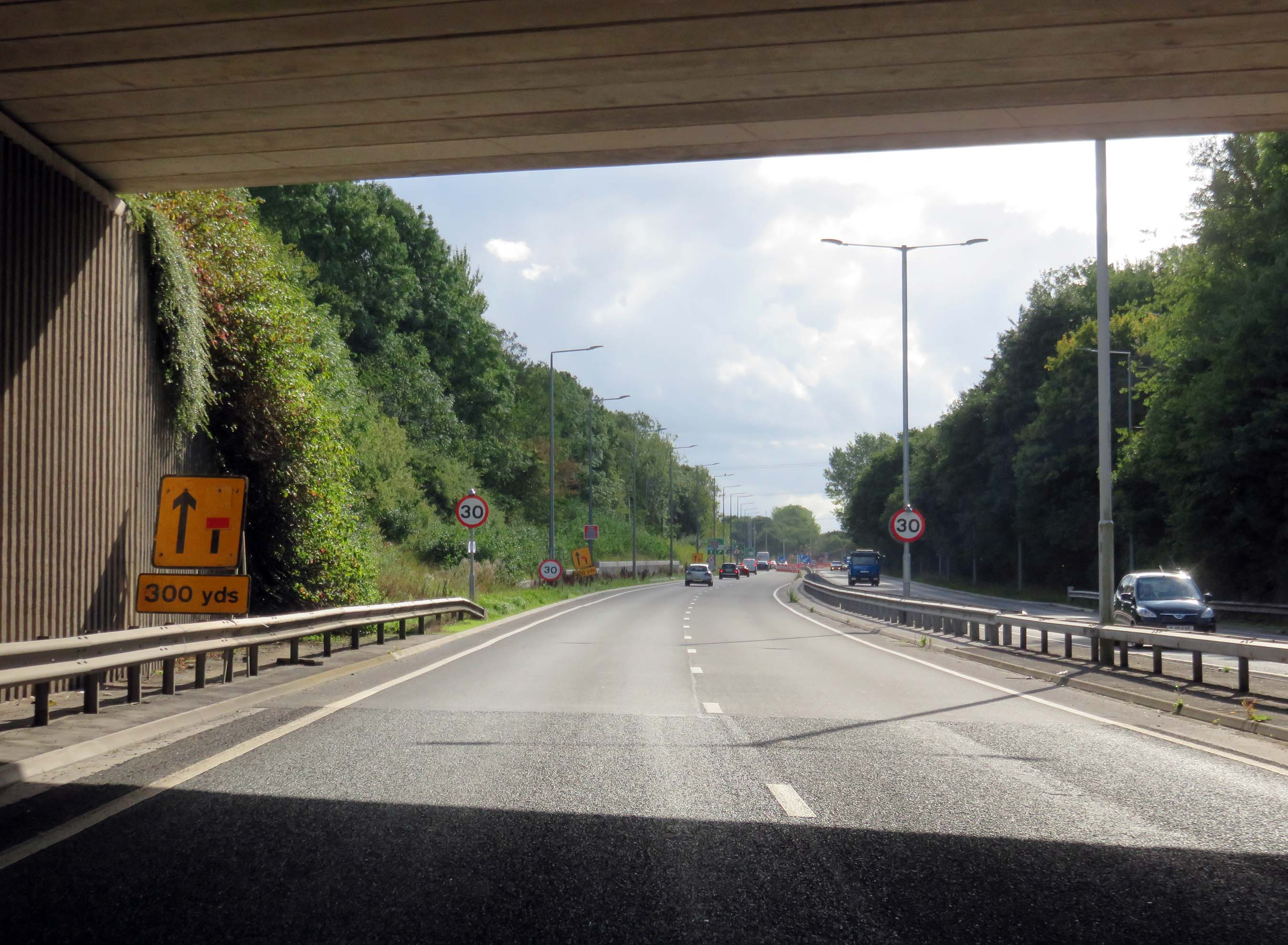
- A59 road following the route of the railway through the former station

General information
- Location: South Ribble, Lancashire; England
- Coordinates: 53.7394°N 2.7267°W
- Platforms: 2

Other information
- Status: Disused

History
- Original company: Lancashire and Yorkshire Railway
- Post-grouping: London, Midland and Scottish Railway

Key dates
- 17 April 1911: Opened as Cop Lane or Cop Lane Halt
- 30 March 1940: Renamed to Penwortham Cop Lane
- 7 September 1964: Closed
Location

Penwortham Cop Lane was a railway station on the Lancashire and Yorkshire Railway's Southport & Preston, Lancashire line, the former West Lancashire Railway. It served the town of Penwortham in Lancashire.

The station was opened as Cop Lane or Cop Lane Halt by the Lancashire and Yorkshire Railway on 17 April 1911 as Cop Lane. (Note: The two names, with and without 'Halt' seem to have been used interchangeably, and sometimes with a hyphen. Hindle (2022) suggests it was initially just called Cop Lane. Local newspapers say it was Cop Lane Halt. Gregson (2011) says that the London, Midland and Scottish Railway removed any ambiguity by renaming the station to Penwortham Cop Lane in 1940.)

The station was located where Cop Lane crossed the line on an over-bridge approximately 0.8 miles (1.3 km) south of Penwortham.

There were two wooden platforms, one either side of the double-track running lines, each platform had a small wooden building containing a shelter and small booking office. The platforms were accessed by a ramp down from the road over-bridge at the north (Preston) end of the station.The platforms were lit with oil lamps throughout the stations existence. The station had no goods facilities.

It was renamed to Penwortham Cop Lane on 30 March 1940, and was closed by British Rail on 7 September 1964.

The cutting which once carried the railway under Cop Lane has been widened and now carries the A59 Penwortham bypass.

Preceding station	Disused railways	Following station
New Longton & Hutton; Line and station closed	Lancashire and Yorkshire Railway; Southport & Preston line former West Lancashire Railway	Preston (ELR); Line and station closed

== Bibliography ==
- Gregson, Bob (2011). The Lancashire and Yorkshire railway around Preston : a history of the East and West Lancashire sections including Lostock Hall. Preston: Atkinson Publications. ISBN 978-0-9565-1845-3. OCLC 1345565762.
- Hindle, David John (2022). Lament for a Branch Line: The Preston to Southport Railway (2nd Enlarged ed.). Silver Link Books. ISBN 978 1 85794 609 3.
- Quick, Michael (2023) [2001]. Railway passenger stations in Great Britain: a chronology (PDF). version 5.05. Railway & Canal Historical Society.
- Shannon, Paul; Hillmer, John (2004). West, East and North Lancashire. British Railways Past and Present 43. Great Addington: Past & Present Publishing. ISBN 978-1-85895-237-6.
