= Penwortham Castle =

Castle in the United Kingdom

- Penwortham, Lancashire in England
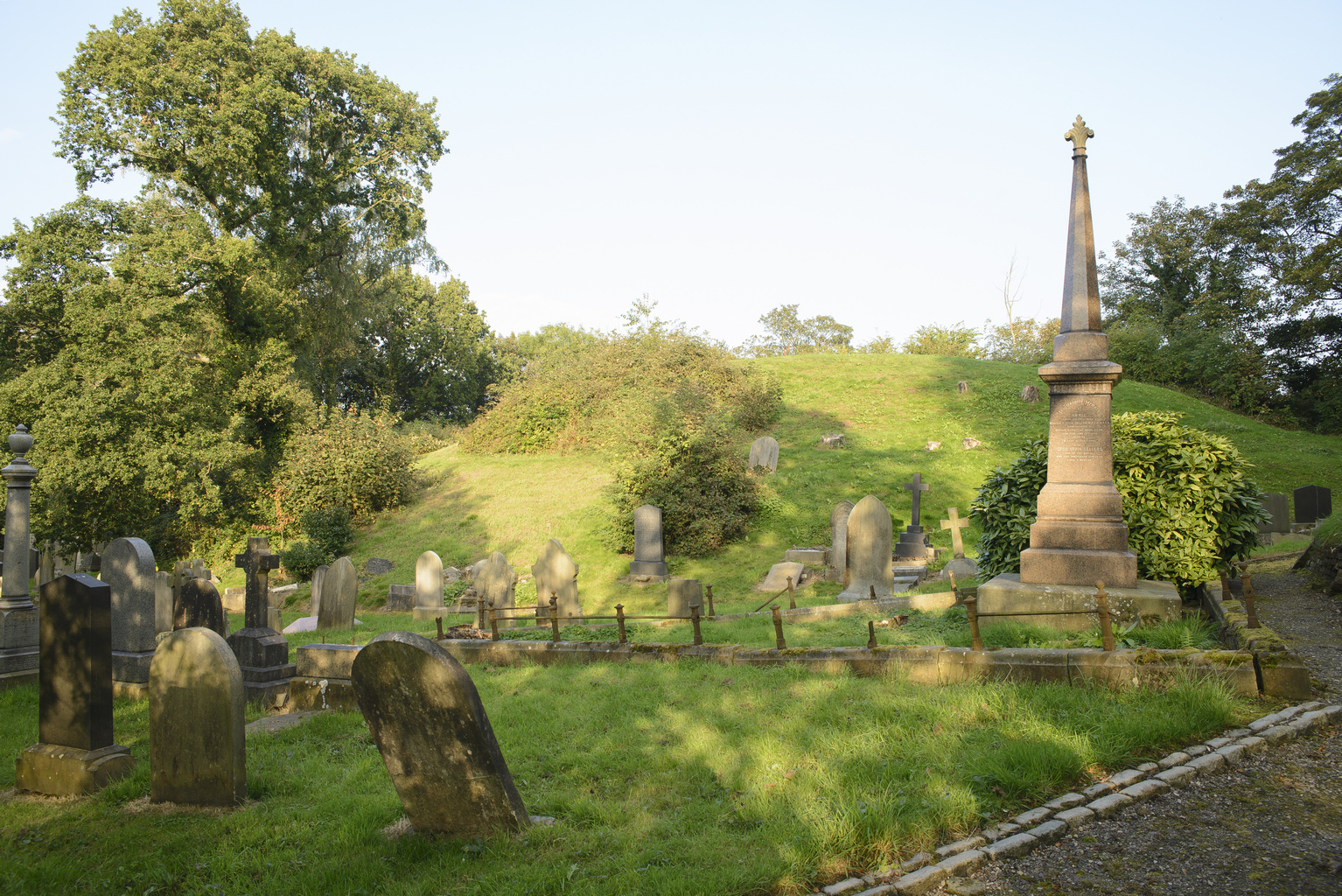
- The motte

Site information
- Type: Castle

Location
- Location in the Borough of South Ribble
- Coordinates: 53.7560°N 2.7234°W

Site history
- Built: Mediaeval
- In use: Until 1232

Scheduled monument
- Official name: Castle Hill motte
- Designated: 26 November 1969
- Reference no.: 1011868

Penwortham Castle was built on the south bank of the River Ribble, at Penwortham to the west of Preston, Lancashire, England, at grid reference SD524291. The site is a Scheduled Ancient Monument, although only the mound remains.

It was built shortly after the Norman Conquest as a motte castle by Roger of Poitou. It served to guard the estuary of the river and a ford crossing it. It was recorded in the Domesday Book in 1086 as having attached to it: six burgesses, three 'radmen' (riding men), eight villeins and four neatherds (cattle keepers). When Roger built Lancaster Castle, Penwortham declined in importance.

In the early 13th century Randolph de Blundeville, Earl of Chester and baron of Lancaster, held his courts in the castle, but soon after the castle fell into disrepair.

== See also ==
- Scheduled monuments in Lancashire
