= Horrockses, Crewdson & Co. =

Textile company based in Preston, Lancashire

Horrockses, Crewdson & Co. was a textile company based in Preston, Lancashire. The company was originally formed in 1791 under the name of Horrocks. Over the centuries, the name of the company changed with the involvement of various business partners and when the company merged with others.

== Origin ==
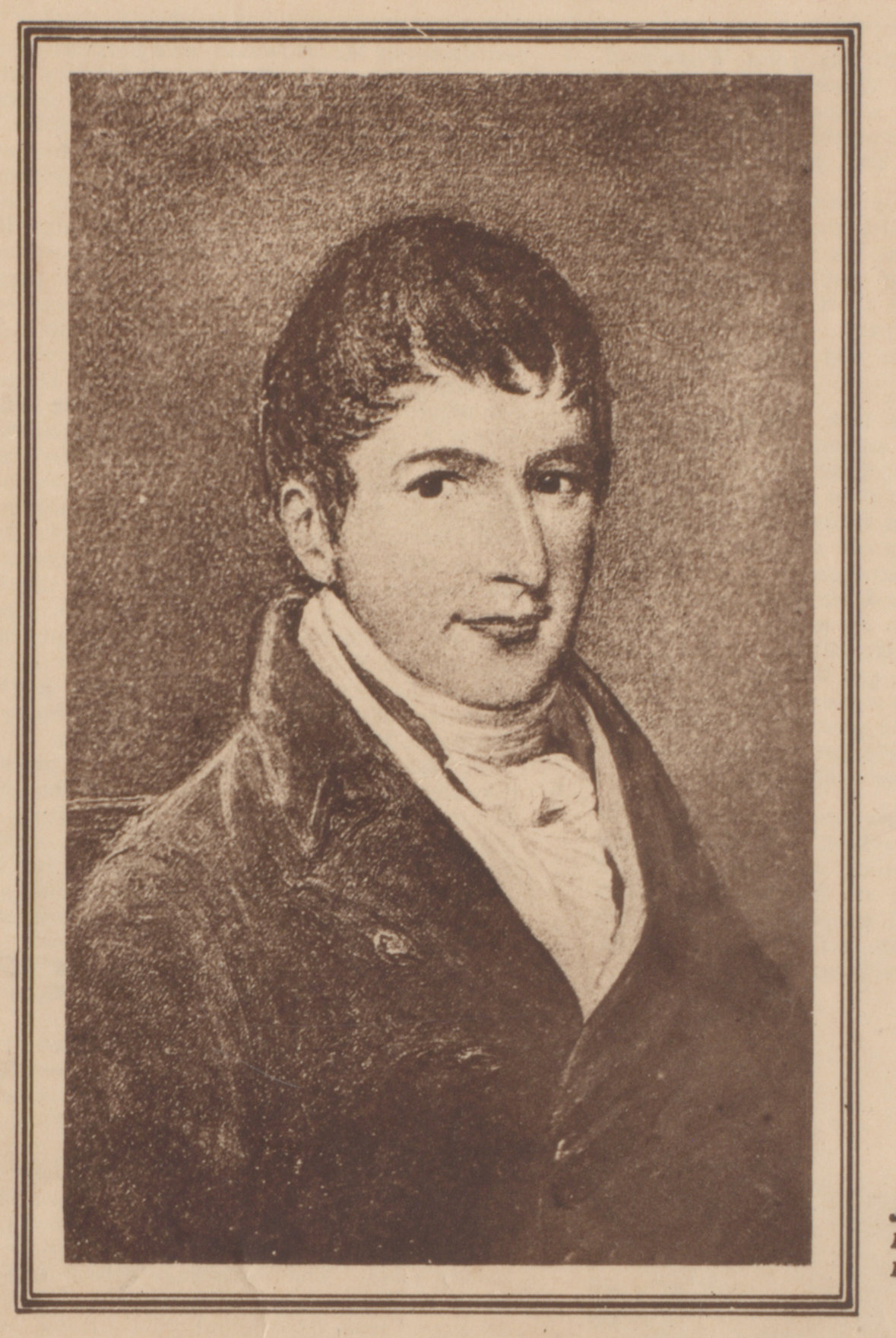
Portrait of John Horrocks, textile pioneer

The company was formed by John Horrocks in 1791. John Horrocks was the son of John Horrocks, a quarry master and manufacturer of millstones at Edgworth near Bolton. At the time, the cotton business and the textile industry was expanding and John Horrocks was interested in its possibilities. He originally bought two or three frames to spin cotton and started his business in his father's factory. The yarn produced was sold to John Watson, who had the first cotton mill in Preston. After a disagreement with Watson and realising the potential of the textile industry, Horrocks set up his own business there.

The mill began in a small building within Turk's Head Court, Preston. With his business growing, JHorrocks realised that he needed more capital to develop and began to search for a business partner. One potential business partner, a Mr Bolton, was apparently scared away by Horrocks' enthusiasm, but a successful partnership with Richard Newsham allowed Horrocks to build his first mill in 1791 on Dale Street, Preston. After the first mill was built, the business continued to grow with a series of mills built over the course of ten years.

As the business began to develop, John asked his brother Samuel Horrocks to join him and made him a partner within the firm. John also invited his uncle, Issac Horrocks, to join the business and later gave him the Turks Head Court business.

Horrocks died in London in 1804 at the age of 36. He was succeeded both in his business and as the parliamentary representative for Preston by his brother Samuel. He left his partnership in the business to his son John, and the bulk of his money to his son Peter. Records show that John the younger sold his shares in the firm to his uncle when he came of age in 1815.

== Horrockses, Miller and Co. ==
By 1815, the company was called Horrocks, Miller and Co. Thomas Miller began to work for the Horrocks brothers in 1802, specialising in clouding, which was a different type of yarn developed by twist and colour, and was achieved by running two yarns of strongly contrasted colours through separate pairs of rollers. Thomas Miller was originally from Bolton, but was recommended to John and Samuel Horrocks and they made him a partner of the firm. Miller was also influential within the borough of Preston becoming a council member like John and Samuel Horrocks. After his death in January 1840, he left a large interest and the principal management of Horrocks, Miller and Co. to his son Thomas Miller.

By 1840, following the death of Samuel Horrocks and his son, there are no references or records of any involvement of the Horrocks family within the business. After the death and retirement of many members, Thomas Miller became the sole proprietor of Horrocks, Miller and Co. Miller was a popular figure within the community having purchased the estate and manor of Singleton in Fylde and became one of the largest landowners in Fylde. He was known to be a very generous man and donated to many causes including the rebuild of his local church. Similar to partners before him, he was also involved in the local councils. Thomas Miller married Henrietta Sarah, a daughter of Rev. Cornelius Pitt in 1841 who was also the niece of John and Samuel Horrocks. They had five children but like previous children of partners, none of them seem to have any involvement within the textile business and it was known that upon his death in 1865, his eldest son was preparing to enter the army.

Once Thomas Miller took over the control of the firm in 1840, other people who were involved in the firm became partners within the business. In 1860, a Mr Edward Hermon, who previously had been a salesman, was admitted a partner and in 1866, a Mr Styles, who was the London salesman, was admitted. Thomas Miller died in 1865 and by 1887; Horrockses, Crewdson & Co was firmly established.

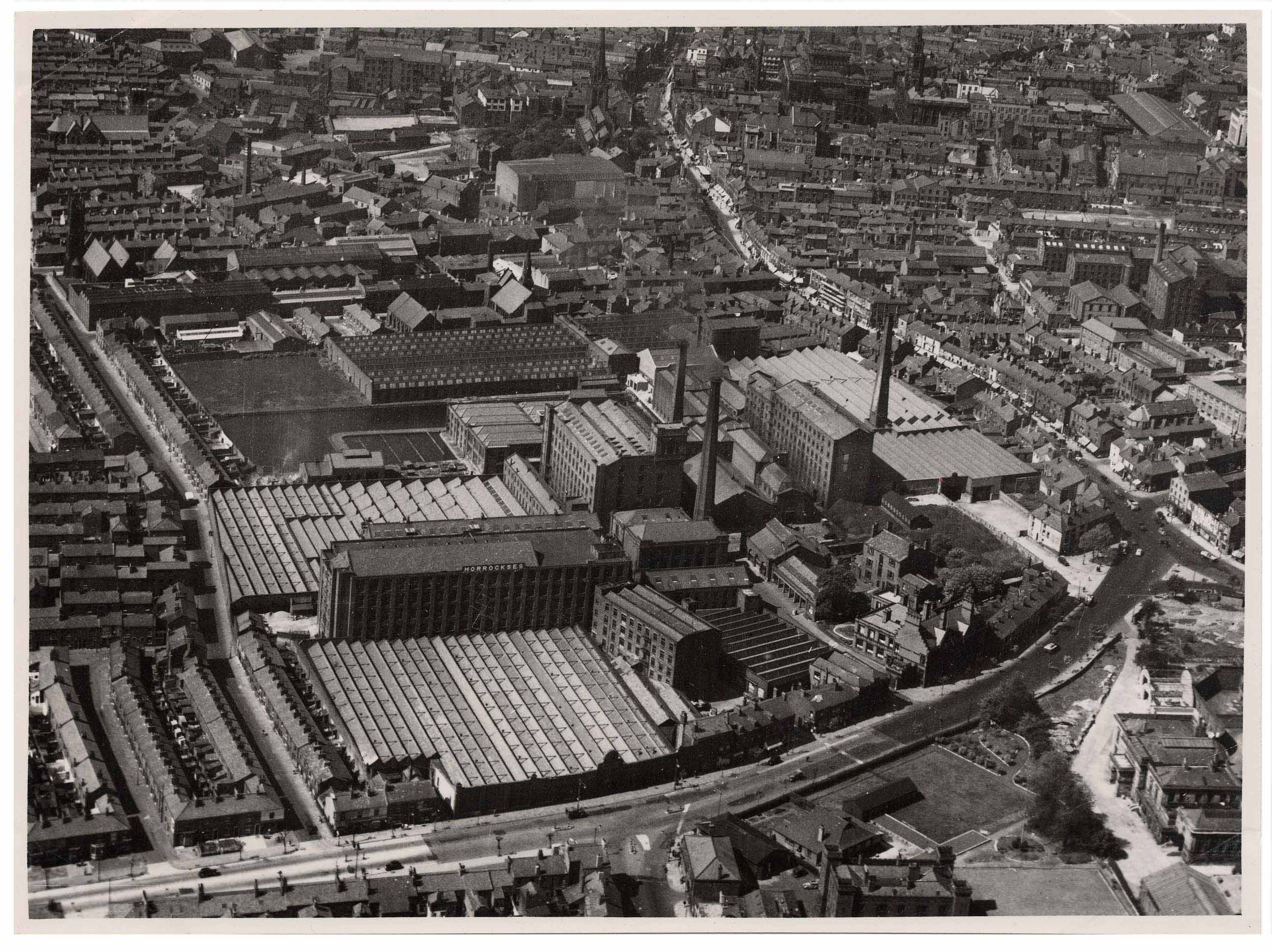
Horrockses Yard Works, Preston, 1940s

Talks between Horrocks, Miller and Co. and Crewdson, Crosses and Co. Ltd took place in 1885 but it wasn't until 1887 when the two companies merged to become Horrockses, Crewdson & Co. The company planned to remain 'businesses of cotton spinners, doublers and manufacturers of cloth and other goods manufactured from cotton'. By merging the companies, there were more partners involved and more business connections. The creation of Horrockses, Crewdson & Co. was the start of a new period for the company. Offices were based in Preston, Manchester and London and the company was expanding further with more possibilities overseas.

The company grew and prospered with more subsidiary companies and an increase in the amount of cotton and products produced. Throughout this period, the board of directors changed frequently due to death and retirement. With the company expanding and documents often lacking in details, it is hard to keep a record of all the directors of the company. The lack of documents within the Horrockses, Crewdson & Co. collection at Lancashire Archives often produces gaps in the history of the company. Gaps in the history of the company continue, as very little is known about the company during the two world wars. While there is little information about the company during the first world war, information can be found in reference to the second.

During the second world war, the business was involved in the Government's concentration scheme. The scheme was a voluntary merger of factories in order to free up space and production facilities for essential war work.

== Horrockses Fashions ==
Following the war, the economy had changed and the way people bought clothes and fabrics had also changed. Ready-to-wear manufacture had been growing steadily during the period between the two world wars and Horrockses, Crewdson & Co. saw the opportunities for the business. In 1946, the first collection from Horrockses Fashions became available in retailers. Horrockses Fashions had the advantage of the Horrocks name, which had a strong reputation with the fabric industry, and Horrockses Fashion collections were predominantly made from cotton cloth which had been woven at the Preston factory, with fabrics designed exclusively for them. Horrockses Fashions was a huge success for the company. The popularity of the clothing expanded Horrockses Fashions line was soon producing items ranging from simple cotton shirtwaisters to glamorous evening gowns. Horrockses Fashions was soon so popular and well respected that the Queen packed cotton dresses from specialist wholesaler Horrockses for her six-month tour of the Commonwealth in 1953-4.

== Later history ==
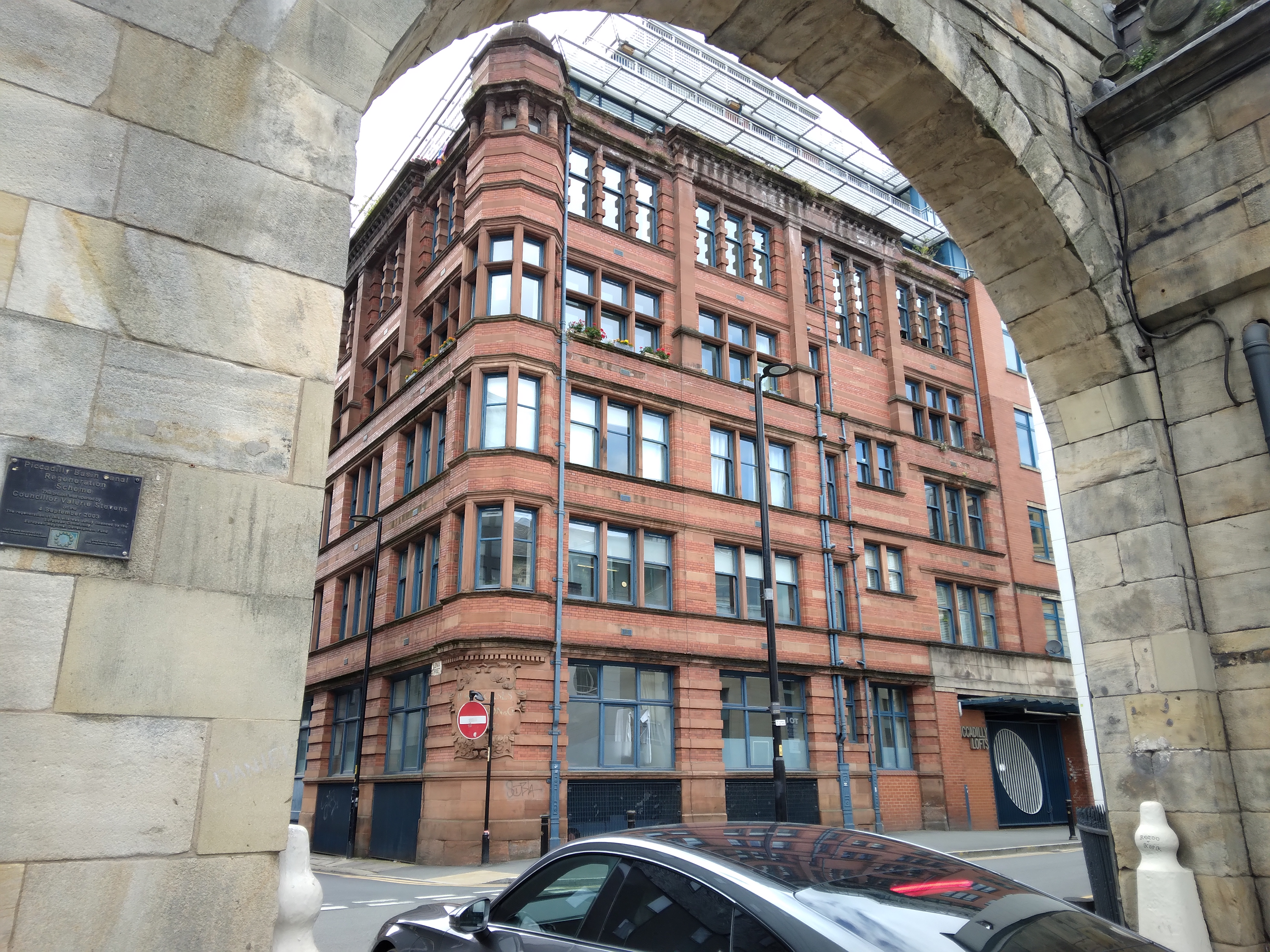
Former warehouse of the company visible through the Piccadilly Basin entry arch, Manchester city centre

Records show Horrockses, Crewdson & Co. expanded overseas, with a foreign agency in Portugal in 1823 and another in India in 1830. The company continued to have mergers and relationships with other companies and countries throughout 19th and 20th century. Branches were established overseas, such as Horrockses Fashions Canada.

Horrockses, Crewdson & Co. retained a presence in Preston even when headquarters moved to London as the company grew. In the 20th century, the company received royal visits, including from foreign monarchy such as King Fuad of Egypt in 1927 and the Sultan of Zanzibar in 1929.

While Horrockses Fashions survived as a brand until 1983, its peak success was between the years of 1946 to 1964. Horrockses then went into a decline starting in the 1960s, and despite attempts to revive it with a new line of bed linen in the 1980s, the Horrockses name was eventually shelved. Horrockses Fashions has been revived twice since then; in 2011 for bed linens and later in 2016, this time focusing on fashion. The 2011 relaunch was initiated by Brookman Home, the firm which inherited the Horrockses brand, and consisted of a collection of bed linens, inspired by original dress designs. In 2013, the Horrockses name went up for sale, after Dawson International Holdings (which held the Horrockses brand) fell into administration in 2012. Bluewell Ventures acquired the name for a six-figure sum, and said it would relaunch Horrockses as a fashion label and target international markets. In spring 2016, the revived Horrockses released a line of clothing through the popular online clothing company, ASOS.com, with additional clothing pieces later in 2016 and 2017. The fashion line is made with cloth printed in the UK with dresses manufactured in London, and inspired by the original patterns from the brand's peak years.

== Notes ==
=== References ===
- Boydell, Christine (2010). Horrockses Fashions Off-the-Peg Style in the '40s and '50s. London: V&A Publishing. ISBN 9781851776016.
