= Penwortham Priory Academy =

Location
- Crow Hills Road; Penwortham; Preston, Lancashire, Lancashire, PR1 0JE; England; 53.74993°N 2.74177°W

Information
- Type: Academy
- Religious affiliation: None
- Local authority: Lancashire
- Department for Education URN: 138948 Tables
- Ofsted: Reports
- Headteacher: Matt Eastham
- Gender: Coeducational
- Age: 11 to 16
- Houses: Calder, Hodder, Douglas, Ribble
- Colours: Black, White, Blue, Green, Yellow, Red
- Website: http://www.priory.lancs.sch.uk/

Penwortham Priory Academy is a coeducational secondary school located in Penwortham in the English county of Lancashire.

Previously a community school administered by Lancashire County Council, Priory Sports and Technology College converted to academy status on 1 November 2012 and was renamed Penwortham Priory Academy. However the school continues to coordinate with Lancashire County Council for admissions.

Penwortham Priory Academy offers GCSEs as programmes of study for pupils. The school also offers some vocational courses in conjunction with Myerscough College and Runshaw College.

== History ==
Priory was first a Benedictine Priory dedicated to St. Mary until its lands were sold to the Fleetwood family at a price of £3,088. The Fleetwood family then built a mansion in its place, which became known as Penwortham Priory, and lived there until 1749. The Rawstorne family lived at the Priory from 1783 until it was demolished in 1925.

The school was opened as a secondary modern in 1953, built to serve the children and families of Penwortham's local community. In 1977, the school transitioned to a reorganised comprehensive school named Penwortham Priory High School. It was this reorganisation that prompted work to start on the building of the science labs, sports hall, and Squash courts as part of a dual-use agreement between the school and the local borough council. Later, this agreement saw the building of the swimming pool and the Astroturf facilities.

In 2000, Priory was awarded Specialist Technology College status and became Priory Technology College. Two purpose-built, innovative ICT rooms were developed to integrate the new media age in school.

Following this, in 2003, the science facilities were increased to include three new purpose-built laboratories and one room devoted to the use of ICT in science.

Priory gained further credit in 2005 by becoming the first school in Lancashire to gain a second specialism in sport. In recognition of this, the school changed its name to Priory Sports and Technology College in order to reflect the dual specialist status. From this development came the linking of the school Sports Hall to a new PE and School Sport Independent Study Centre to allow students, as part of their lessons, to make the connection between the practical and theoretical aspects of sport more easily.

2008 saw the next step in the development of the facilities at Priory. A brand new multimillion-pound Technology block was created, alongside the development of the Maths and English classrooms. All were enlarged, re-equipped, and changed to produce modern creative learning spaces with the latest relevant technologies. The dining room also had a complete overhaul at this time to improve eating facilities.

In 2010, there was a complete change to the resource centre area with the creation of the Accessible Resource Centre - the 'ARC'. With new, redesigned rooms and corridors, the ARC is an advice and guidance area in the school, designed to be accessible to all students, particularly in supporting them through the difficult choice processes for their post 16 learning.

== Headteachers ==
- Mr. R.E. Summers, first headmaster of the school, remained head for 25 years, from 1952, just before the school officially opened, until his retirement on 22 December 1977.
- Mr. A. Pearce then served as Head from 3 January 1978 until his retirement on 31 August 1989.
- Mr. R. Stringer, Deputy Headteacher, spent a short time as acting Headmaster from 1 September 1989 until 31 December 1989.
- Mr. P. Young then took up post as Head from 1 January 1990 until his retirement on 31 August 2006.
- Mr. J. Hourigan was then appointed from 1 September 2006.
- Mr M. Eastham, the current headteacher, took over from Mr Hourigan in September 2014.

== Notable former pupils ==
- Jessica Taylor, member of pop group Liberty X.
- Jordan North, Radio One DJ
- Michael Potts (footballer), FC United of Manchester, Midfielder/ Club Captain
- Sam Pegram, aid worker, who died in the crash of Ethiopian Airlines Flight 302
- Favour Agbonmwanre and Aisha Bouchelra, founders of Penwortham Priory Academy’s annual culture day
- DaMari Sayles, founder of the annual Black History Month Celebrations
