= All Hallows Catholic High School =

Location
- Crabtree Avenue; Penwortham; Preston, Lancashire, PR1 0LN; England; 53.73868°N 2.73993°W

Information
- Type: Voluntary aided school
- Religious affiliation: Roman Catholic
- Established: 1975
- School district: Lancashire
- Local authority: Lancashire
- Department for Education URN: 119802 Tables
- Ofsted: Reports
- Gender: Coeducational
- Age: 11 to 16
- Website: http://www.allhallows.lancs.sch.uk/

All Hallows Catholic High School is a coeducational secondary school located in Penwortham in the English county of Lancashire.

Established in 1975, it is a Roman Catholic voluntary aided school administered by Lancashire County Council and the Roman Catholic Archdiocese of Liverpool. The school went through an extensive rebuilding programme in 2007.

All Hallows Catholic High School offers GCSEs, BTECs, Cambridge Nationals and ASDAN awards as programmes of study for pupils.

== Notable former pupils ==
- John Thomson (b. 1969) - comedian
- Ashley Dalton (b. 1972) - Labour Party politician, Member of Parliament (MP) for West Lancashire (2023 - present)
- Josh Heaton (b. 1996) - footballer
- Ben Winterbottom (b. 2001) - footballer
