= John Horrocks (politician) =

English cotton manufacturer and Member of Parliament (1768–1804)

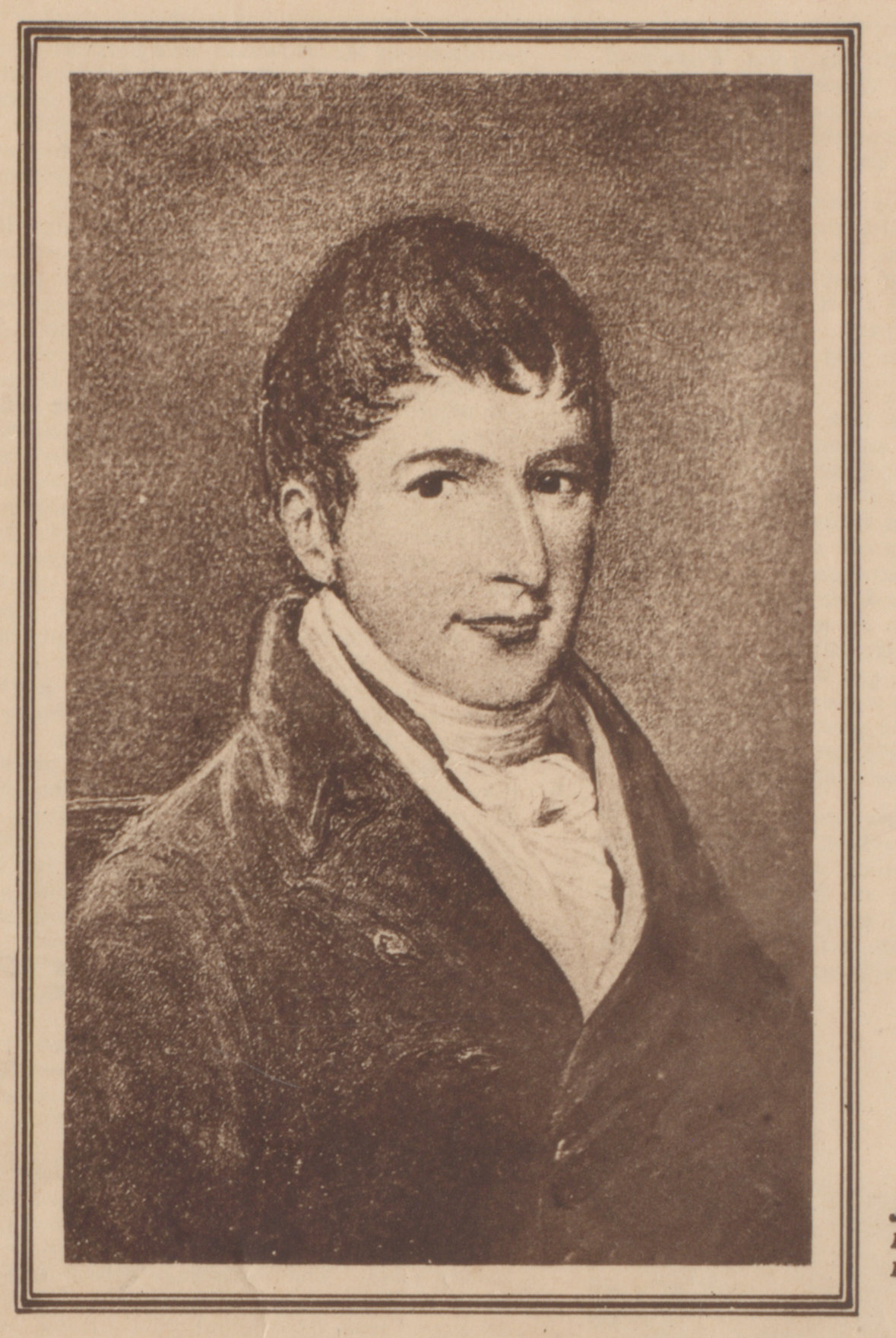
John Horrocks

John Horrocks (27 March 1768 – 1 March 1804) was an English cotton manufacturer and Member of Parliament for Preston.

== Early life ==
He was born in Bradshaw, Lancashire, the son of John Horrocks, owner of a stone quarry, and his wife Jane Booth, the younger of two surviving sons in a family of 18 children. His father, a Quaker, was a manufacturer of stone printing tables for textiles in Edgworth. David Hunt in his 1992 History of Preston comments that many details of his early life are confused. While still young Horrocks worked in Edgworth for Thomas Thomasson, in the cotton trade, who sent him to school in central Manchester but died in 1782.

== Business career ==
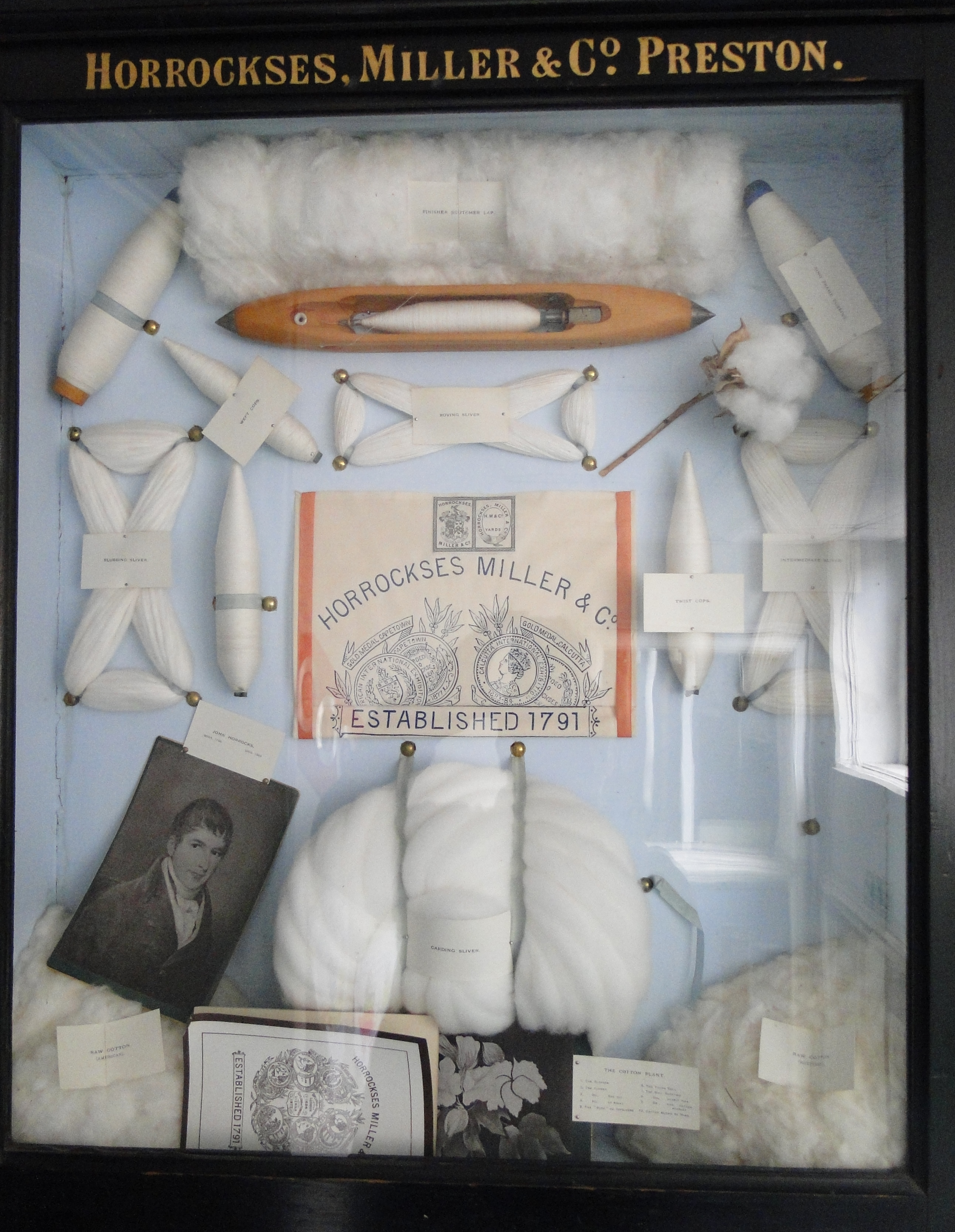
Display from Horrockses Mill

The Lancashire cotton industry was then in its infancy. Horrocks, impressed with its potential, set up spinning-frames in a corner of his father's premises. For a time he combined cotton-spinning on a small scale with stone-working, but eventually concentrated on cotton. About 1791 he moved to Preston, where he began to manufacture cotton shirtings and long-cloths in addition to spinning cotton yarn.

Horrocks took advantage of machinery. By maintaining the quality of his goods, he developed his business rapidly. He was aided by the local financier Richard Newsham (1754–1843), who became a partner, and Thomas Greaves. Within a year of his arrival in Preston he built his first large mill. Shortly after he obtained a monopoly of the manufacture of cottons and muslins for the Indian market from the British East India Company. He took on first his elder brother Samuel Horrocks, and in 1801 John Whitehead and Thomas Miller into partnership. The firm then traded as Horrockses, Miller, & Co.

== In politics ==
In 1794, Horrocks was chosen as a burgess and served as Town Bailiff in 1794–5. He was elected as a council member in 1796 and became an Alderman in 1799.

Horrocks attempted to enter national politics in the 1796 general election, standing for the Preston seat. He had some initial backing from Thomas Tarleton of Liverpool. It was a two-member constituency, with Sir Henry Hoghton, 7th Baronet as sitting member who was standing again, and Edward Smith Stanley making his political debut as a Whig candidate. Tarleton withdrew, but Horrocks had Tory support locally from the Grimshaw family, and from Lord Liverpool. He forced Hoghton and particularly Stanley to spend heavily, and came third in a close contest, 14 votes behind Hoghton.

In 1802, Horrocks entered parliament as Tory member for Preston. Stanley then tried to undermine his economic base, by investing in Preston rivals Watson, Myers Co. After his death less than two years later, his brother Samuel Horrocks took over his seat in an uncontested by-election, Sir Thomas Dalrymple Hesketh, 3rd Baronet having held back.

== Death and legacy ==
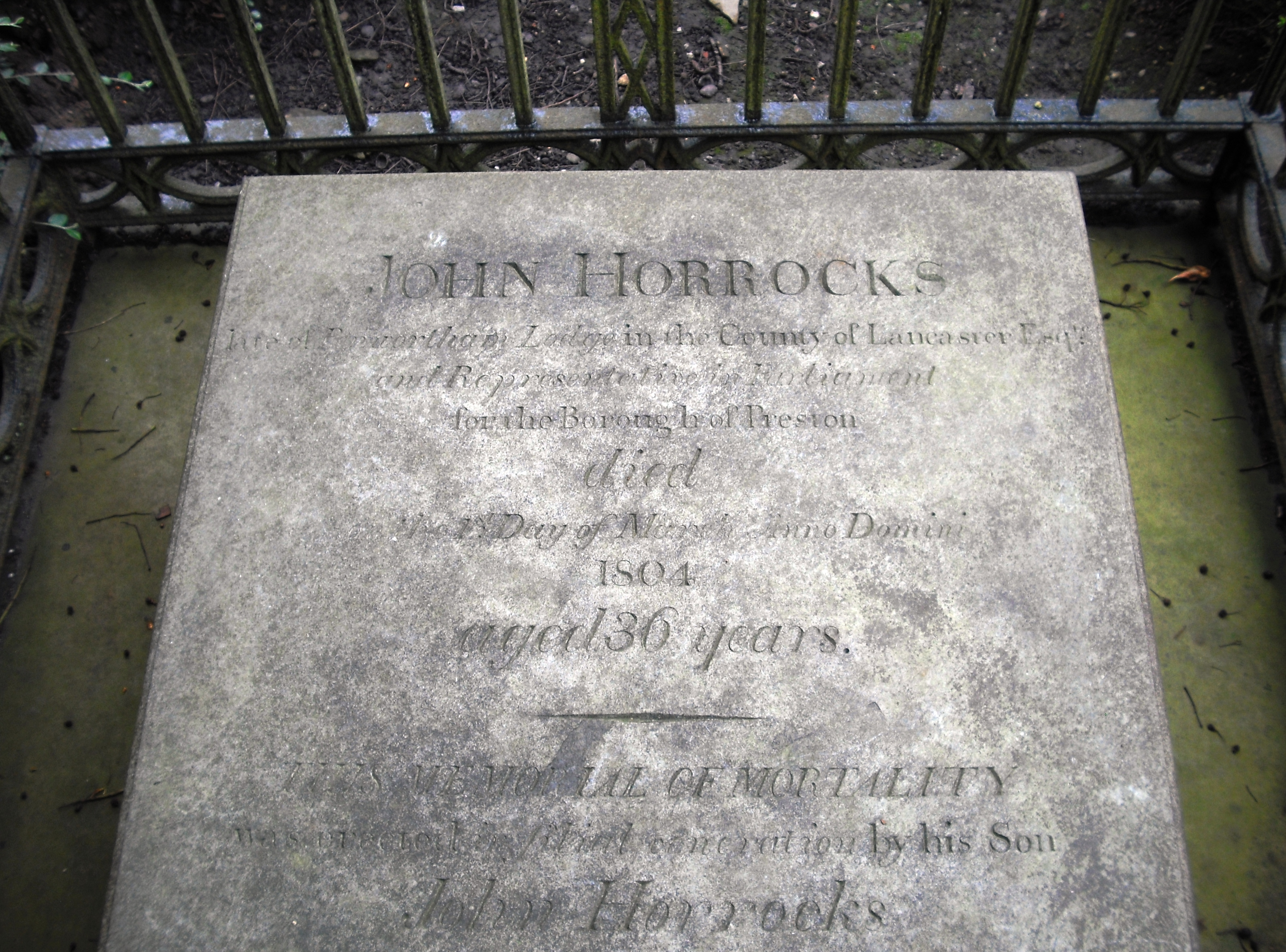
Horrocks' grave at St Mary's Church, Penwortham

Horrocks died in London of brain fever, reportedly resulting from over-work. During his 13 years in Preston he had amassed a personal fortune of at least £150,000, and set the foundations for the Horrocks-Miller mill owning dynasty that dominated Preston into the mid-nineteenth century.

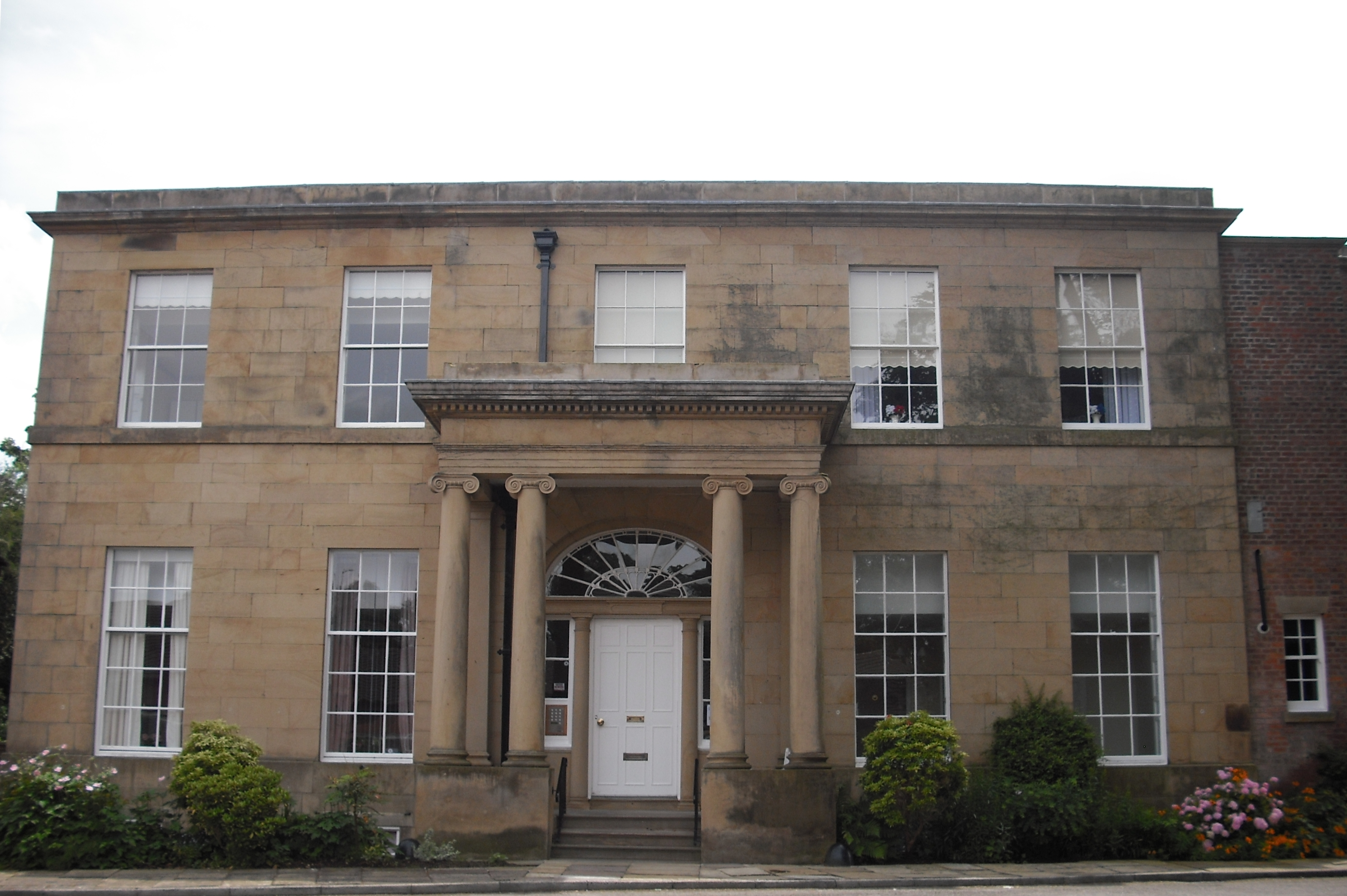
Penwortham Hall, Penwortham built by John Horrocks in 1801

In 1801 Horrocks built "The Lodge" (later called Penwortham Hall) in Penwortham as a residence for himself. The property, which is a Grade II listed building, is today used as a series of private dwellings. He died in 1804 and was buried at St Mary's Church, Penwortham. John Horrocks Way, part of the Penwortham bypass, is named after him. He was the grandfather of explorer John Horrocks.

Parliament of the United Kingdom
Preceded by Sir Henry Hoghton, Bt. Edward Smith-Stanley	Member of Parliament for Preston; 1802–1804; With: Edward Smith-Stanley 1796–1812	Succeeded by Edward Smith-Stanley; Samuel Horrocks
