= New Longton =

Village in Lancashire, England

Coordinates: 53.726°N 2.746°W

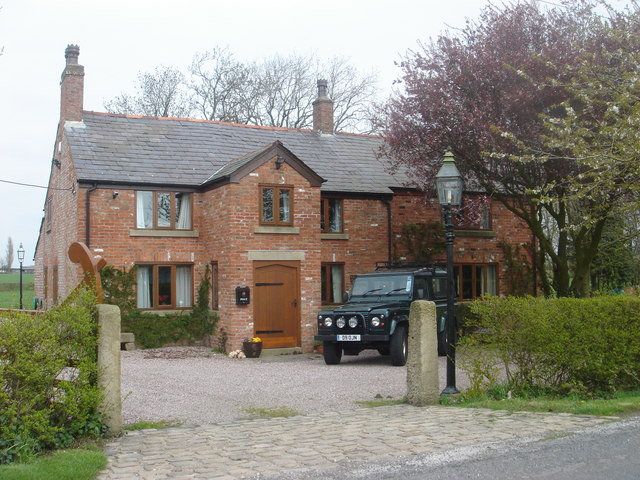
- Harrison's Farm

- Shown within South Ribble Location within Lancashire
- Population: 2,228
- OS grid reference: SD507257
- Civil parish: Longton
- District: South Ribble
- Shire county: Lancashire
- Region: North West
- Country: England
- Sovereign state: United Kingdom
- Post town: PRESTON
- Postcode district: PR4
- Dialling code: 01772
- Police: Lancashire
- Fire: Lancashire
- Ambulance: North West
- UK Parliament: South Ribble

New Longton is a village located 4 miles (6 km) south west of Preston, in the district of South Ribble, in the county of Lancashire, North West England. It is in the parish of Longton, which is the name of the older village located 2 miles (3 km) to the west of New Longton.

== History ==
The development of New Longton was prompted by the building of the West Lancashire Railway between Preston and Southport in Victorian times. A station called "Hutton and Howick", later renamed "New Longton and Hutton" was built at the junction of what is now Station Road and Chapel Lane, where there was a level crossing.

Since the 1940s housing estate development has taken place south of Hugh Barn Lane and Wham Lane. Other small estates, including the council estate in Dickson Hey, were built on both sides of Station Road. The village lost its railway service in the 1960s, and is a commuter village with an irregular bus service into Longton and Preston City Centre, which is provided by Preston Bus.

== People ==
The actor and television presenter Peter Purves, known for his time on Blue Peter, was born in New Longton.
