= Penwortham =

Town in Lancashire, England

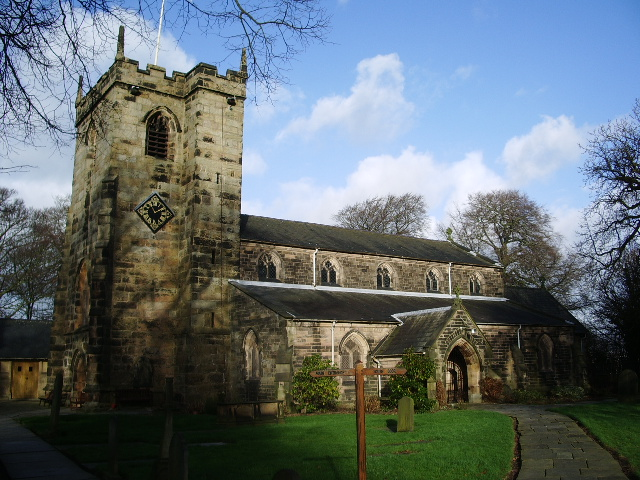
- St. Mary's Church

- Shown within South Ribble Location within Lancashire
- Population: 22,570 (2021)
- OS grid reference: SD524290
- Civil parish: Penwortham
- District: South Ribble
- Shire county: Lancashire
- Region: North West
- Country: England
- Sovereign state: United Kingdom
- Post town: PRESTON
- Postcode district: PR1
- Dialling code: 01772
- Police: Lancashire
- Fire: Lancashire
- Ambulance: North West
- UK Parliament: South Ribble

Penwortham (/ˈpɛnwɜːrðəm/) is a town and civil parish in South Ribble, Lancashire, England, on the south bank of the River Ribble facing the city of Preston. The town is at the most westerly crossing point of the river, with major road and rail links crossing it here. The population of the town at the 2021 Census was 22,570.

== History ==
The distinctive town name is derived from Celtic and Anglo Saxon origins, it is a hybrid of the Welsh pen, meaning hill and the Old English word worphamm, meaning enclosed homestead, with earlier names of Peneverdant and Pendrecham (1200); Penwrtham (1204); Penuertham (1212); Penwortham (1260) and Penewrthamn (1292).

The town's history can be traced to pre-historic times with archaeological evidence showing that the ford at Middleforth was used to cross the River Ribble. Penwortham was listed in the Domesday Book as "Penverdent". At the Norman conquest in 1066 the Barony was held by King Edward. In the 12th century Penwortham was the head of a barony held by Warine Bussel which included a large part of Leyland Hundred and manors in West Derby and Amounderness. Penwortham Castle, a motte-and-bailey castle was built during the post-Norman Conquest period overlooking the Ribble and its ford by Roger of Poitou and served to guard the estuary and a ford crossing it. After Roger built Lancaster Castle, Penwortham declined in importance. Some evidence of this castle is still evident in St Mary's Churchyard but only the mound remains. In later centuries a manor house was built, but no evidence remains.

The barony was acquired by Roger de Lacy in 1205, and descended as part of the Honour of Clitheroe to the Earls and Dukes of Lancaster and the Crown. In the 16th century there were disputes about suit and service due to the court of Penwortham from the members of the fee. Charles I sold the royal manor to Edward Ditchfield and others in 1628 and it later passed to the Faringtons of Worden in Leyland. Courts were held until the late 19th century. Court rolls and books are kept at Worden Hall. Penwortham Priory was built in the west of the town.

Higher Penwortham has an old legend linked to it. The Fairy Funeral seen on the road through Penwortham Wood, was thought to forecast death.

Penwortham Hall, formerly called "The Lodge", was built in 1801 by John Horrocks, founder of the Preston cotton-manufacturing industry. It was sold by his son Peter to William Marshall, whose son Frederick died in 1889. It was left by Frederick to his sister, the wife of Rev. T. Ross Finch. The property, which is a Grade II listed building, is today used as a series of private dwellings.

The parish was part of Preston Rural District throughout its existence from 1894 to 1974. In 1974 the parish became part of the Borough of South Ribble.

In 2024, the government housing agency Homes England intervened to allow 1,100 homes to be built in Penwortham after the local councillors had blocked the project for several years.

=== Gallery ===
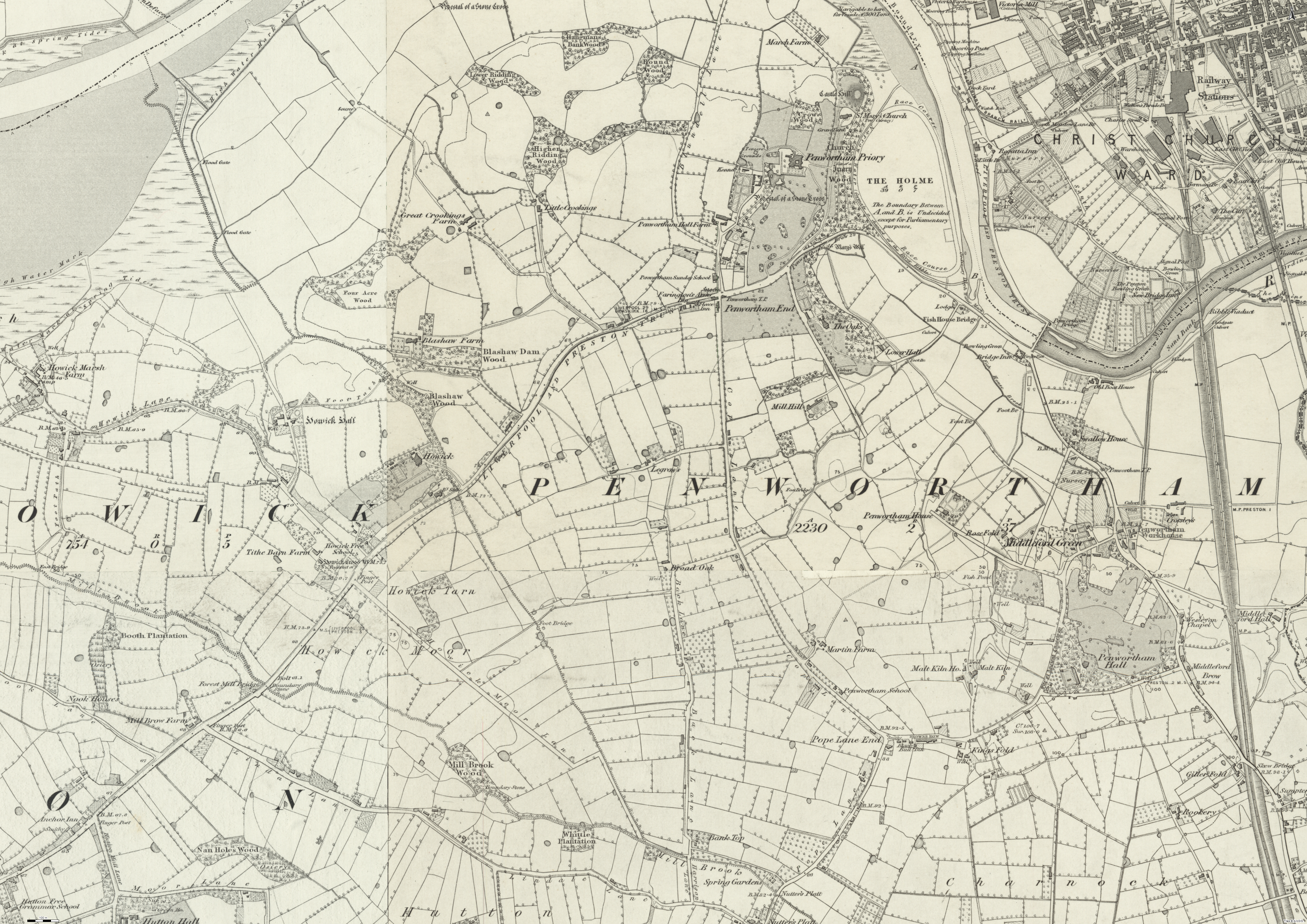
Map of Penwortham in 1845

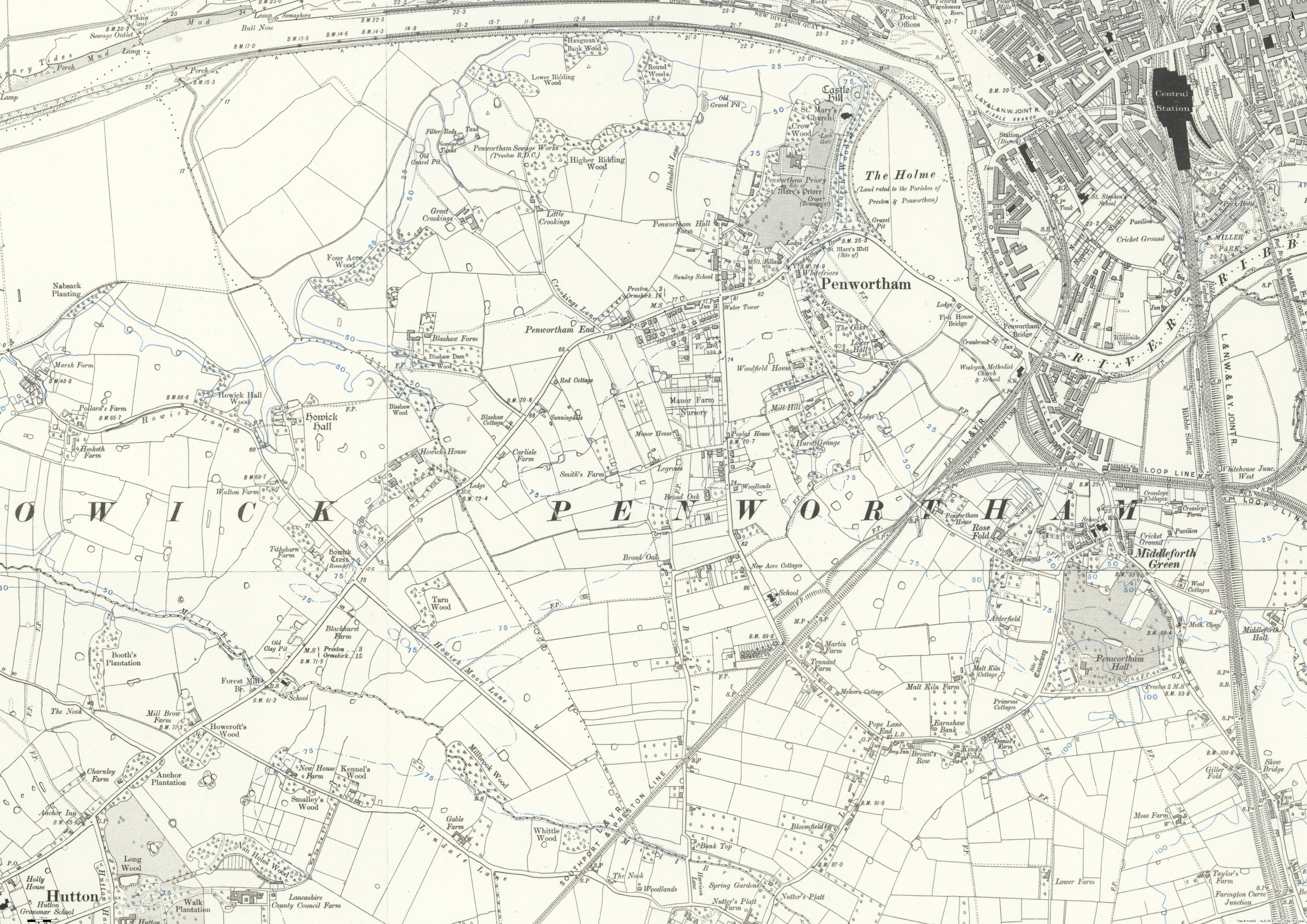
Map of Penwortham in 1909

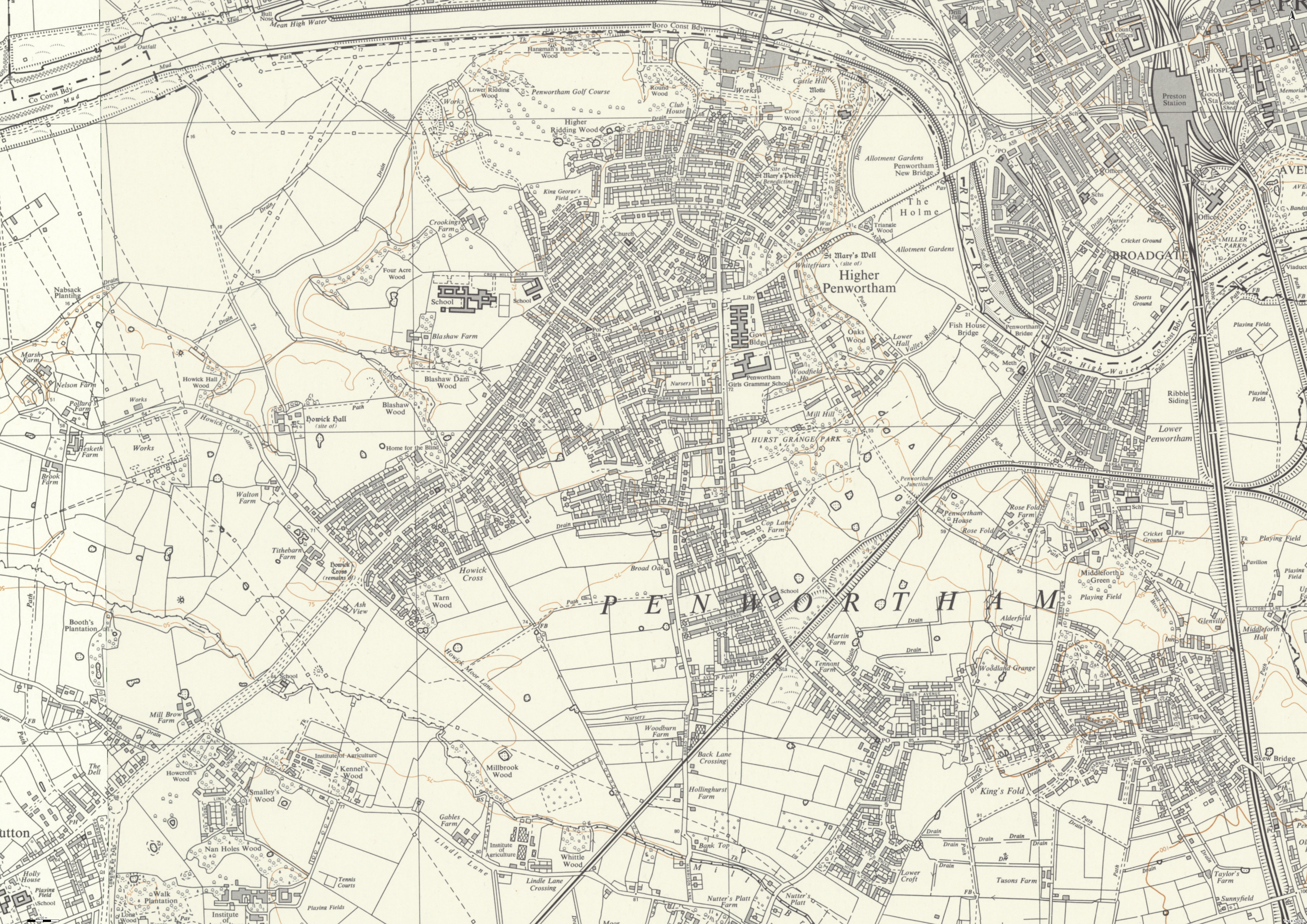
Map of Penwortham in 1960

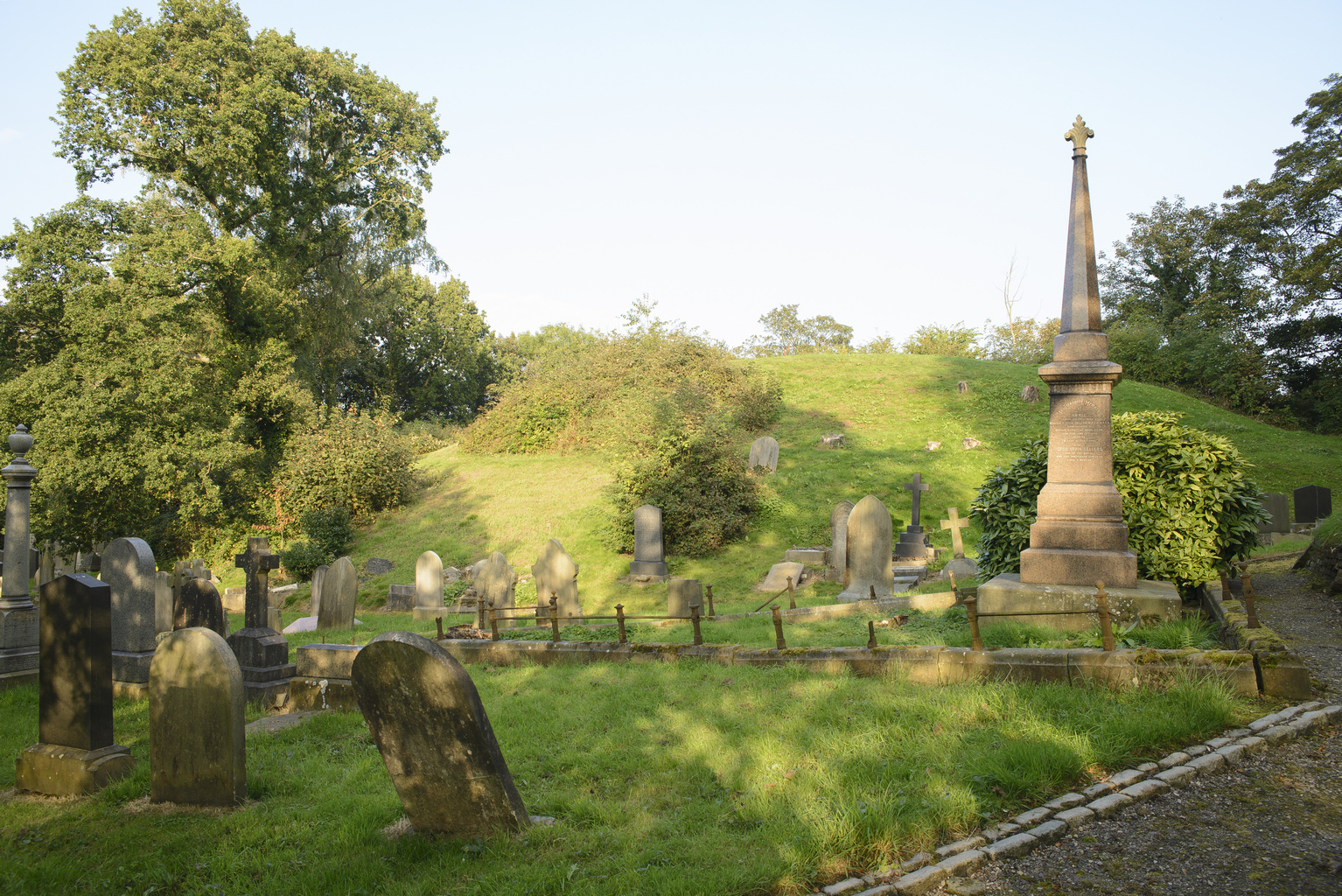
The motte of Penwortham Castle

== Demography ==
Penwortham is one of the largest civil parishes by population in Lancashire, with a population of 23,436 recorded in the 2001 census. The town's development closely resembles that of Preston.

== Geography ==
The Lower Penwortham area developed during the Victorian period which is evidenced by the large number of terrace housing along Leyland Road and the surrounding streets. Higher Penwortham is characterised by its 1920s and onwards, post-war semi-detached housing. The town includes the localities of Howick Cross and Middleforth, and the Kingsfold housing estate.

In recent times there have been several new housing developments, especially around the Broad Oak Farm, Bee Lane, Kingsfold Drive, Stricklands Lane and Factory Lane areas of the town.

== Landmarks ==
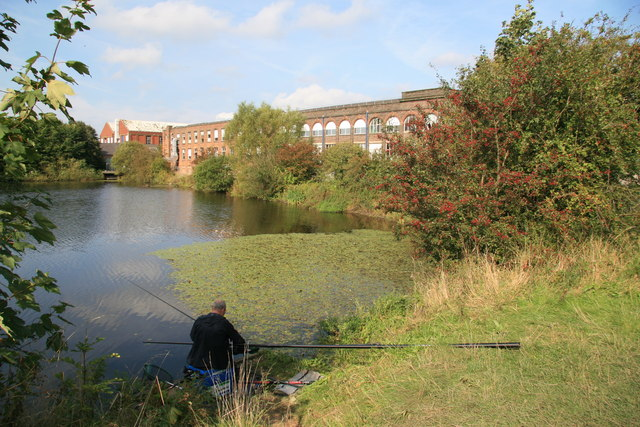
Penwortham Mill

Penwortham Priory was built for the Rawsthorne family and redesigned by the Cumbrian architect George Webster. The priory was demolished due to the rapid expansion of the area and the need for new housing. Penwortham Church Lodge was originally situated on Penwortham Hill towards Preston, but as a consequence of widening the A59 road the lodge was taken down and removed to a residential road in Hutton. Penwortham Water Tower was built in the late 19th century and has been converted to a dwelling. It is part of a development of semi-detached cottages built for employees of the local squire, Lawrence Rawstorne.

The original attempt to build a bridge over the River Ribble to Preston was completed in 1755, only to collapse the following year. The Penwortham Old Bridge opened in 1759 to replace it and still stands today, although it is no longer accessible to motorised traffic.

=== Churches and cemetery ===
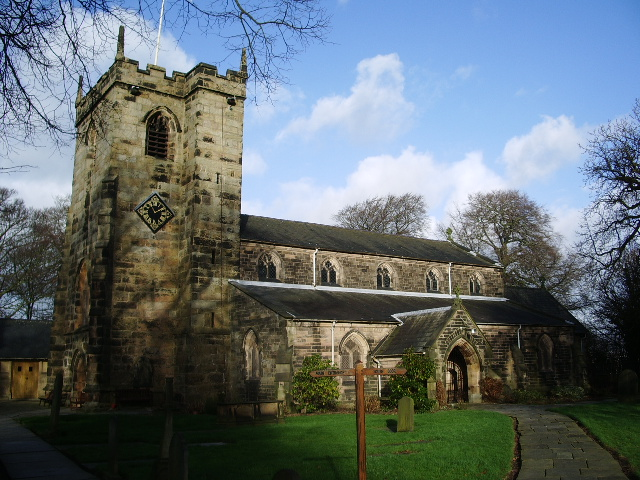
St Mary’s Church, Penwortham

St Mary’s Church, Penwortham is the ancient Anglican parish church, with parts of the present building dating from the 14th century. The church is Grade II* listed and was altered and extended at various periods; it remains active in the Diocese of Blackburn. The adjoining St Mary’s Churchyard contains gravestones dating from at least the late 17th century, including one dated 1686 near the chancel. The churchyard holds the tomb chest of John Horrocks and Commonwealth war graves of nine servicemen from World War I and thirteen servicemen from World War II.

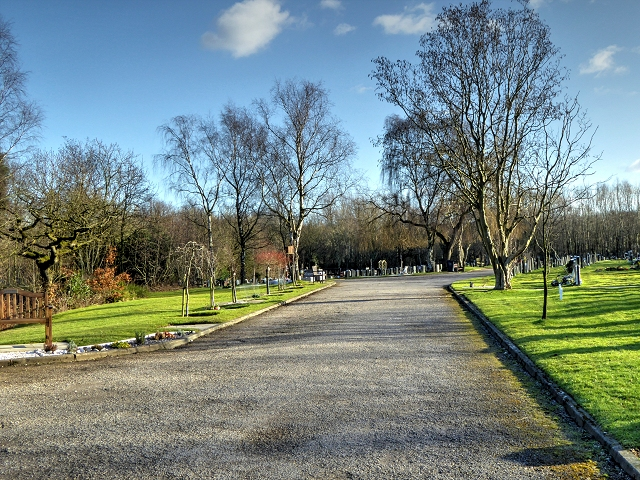
Hill Road Cemetery, Penwortham

Penwortham Cemetery (Hill Road Cemetery) is a municipal burial ground managed by Penwortham Town Council, located on Hill Road (PR1 9XH). It includes lawned burial areas and a woodland‐styled section. The cemetery is open for burials as required; fees differ for residents vs non-residents. Burial records from about 1966 onward are available via the Lancashire OnLine Parish Clerk project.

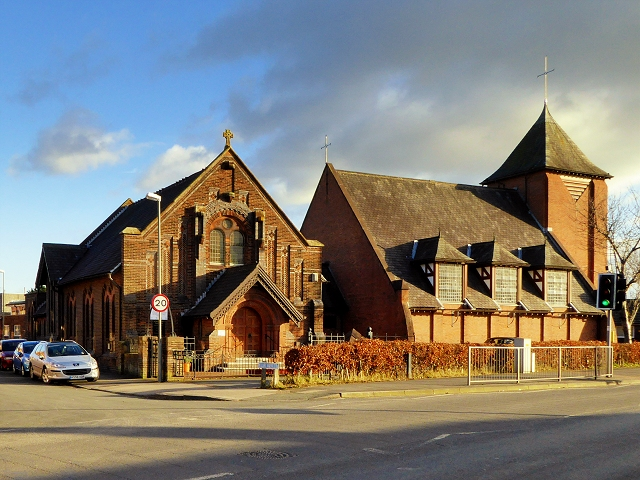
St Mary Magdalen’s Roman Catholic Church, Higher Penwortham

St Mary Magdalen’s Catholic Church, Penwortham is part of the Penwortham & Longton Catholic Community in the Archdiocese of Liverpool. The original church was built in 1912 to designs by W. C. Mangan and replaced in 1987–88 by a new building designed by Francis J. Roberts. It is constructed from red brick with half-timbering and slate roofs, features a prominent east tower, timbered dormers, and stained-glass and decorative detail characteristic of its late-20th-century architecture.

St Leonard’s Church, Penwortham is a Church of England parish church located on Marshall’s Brow (PR1 9JA). The church provides regular worship and community activities, and defines itself as a place where “spiritual growth and meaningful connections flourish,” emphasising fellowship and service.

==== Coordinates and heritage status ====
Site	Coordinates	Listing / Heritage Status
St Mary’s Church, Penwortham	53.75523° N, 2.72346° W	Grade II* listed building (Historic England, entry no. 1073058)
St Leonard’s Church, Penwortham	53.73875° N, 2.71458° W	No listing found
St Mary Magdalen’s Catholic Church, Penwortham	Not available	No listing found
Penwortham Cemetery (Hill Road)	Not available	Municipal cemetery (not listed)

== Education ==
As well as a number of primary schools, the three high schools in Penwortham are All Hallows Catholic High School, Penwortham Girls' High School and Penwortham Priory Academy. All are situated in close proximity to Liverpool Road, in the centre of the town.

== Public services and amenities ==
Penwortham Leisure Centre is part of Penwortham Priory Academy. It includes a 25-metre indoor swimming pool, gym and squash courts which are open to the general public.

One of Lancashire's oldest charities, Galloway's Society for the Blind, established in 1867, has had its headquarters in Penwortham since 1950. The charity provides services to 6,500 blind and visually impaired people across Lancashire and beyond.

In March 2020 Liam Stemson and Ellis McKeown founded Penwortham's first craft gin distillery, Fairham Gin. The pair released their Signature Edition, Dry Lancashire Gin, in April 2021, followed by Ochre Edition in November 2021. In July 2021 the distillery partnered with the Ribble Rivers Trust so that every 70cl bottle of gin buys a tree sapling that is to be planted in the Lancashire area.

== Media ==
Local news and television programmes are provided by BBC North West and ITV Granada. Television signals are received from the Winter Hill TV transmitter. Local radio stations are BBC Radio Lancashire, Heart North West, Smooth North West, Central Radio North West, Greatest Hits Radio Lancashire, Capital Manchester and Lancashire and Radio Leyland, a community based station. The town is served by these local newspapers, Lancashire Telegraph and Lancashire Evening Post.

== Transport ==
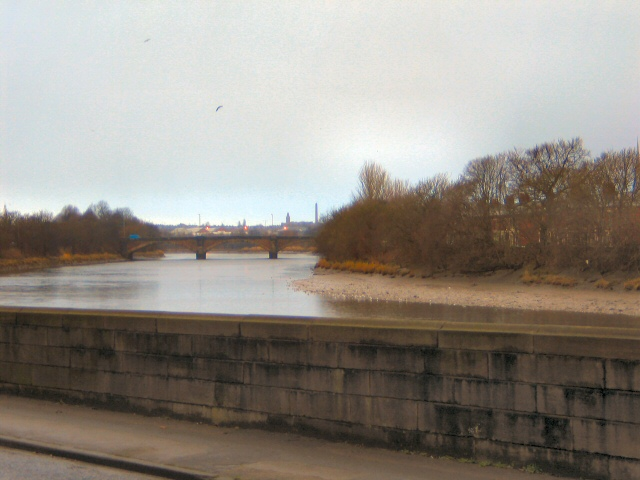
River Ribble from Penwortham Bridge

The town has excellent transport links across the River Ribble. Liverpool Road leads into Preston via the "New Penwortham Bridge" of 1915. Penwortham Cop Lane railway station was on the West Lancashire Railway between Preston and Southport, until the line closed in 1964. The cutting which carried the railway under Cop Lane has been widened and now carries the A59 Penwortham bypass, known as Golden Way, which leads directly into Preston via the "Preston Flyover", which is now the main crossing over the river.

Bus services are operated by Stagecoach in Preston. Services run to Preston, Southport, Liverpool & Ormskirk.

== Notable people ==
- John Horrocks (1768-1804), cotton manufacturer, built and lived in Penwortham Hall.
- Geoffrey Gaut (1909–1992), scientist in Britain's early semiconductor industry
- Dame Susan Elizabeth Ion (born 1955), engineer and expert on the nuclear power industry, went to school locally
- Nick Park (born 1958), English filmmaker and animator, creator of Wallace and Gromit, grew up in Penwortham
- Jessica Taylor (born 1980), English singer with pop group Liberty X, lived in Penwortham

=== Sport ===
- Mark Lawrenson (born 1957), footballer played 488 games, mainly for Liverpool and 39 for Republic of Ireland, now TV pundit, born Preston, grew up in Penwortham
- Andrew Flintoff (born 1977), former England international and Ashes-winning cricketer, played recreationally for Penwortham Cricket Club
- Wade Barrett (born 1980), (real name Stu Bennett) former WWE wrestler, grew up in Penwortham

== Community events ==
Many events are run in Penwortham throughout the year to bring together the community and celebrate different occasions. The longest running event, Penwortham Gala, is held annually on Hurst Grange Park, starting with a procession of floats that are filled with children from local primary schools and community organisations. This is followed by entertainment, stalls and a funfair throughout the day and into the evening. Penwortham Live had its second event after beginning in April 2013, as a festival of music, art, drama and poetry. Live entertainment was available over the weekend throughout many local businesses, predominantly on the main high street, Liverpool Road. Penwortham Christmas market is an annual festive market located on Liverpool Road. This is a one-day event in December, offering craft stalls, gifts, food and drink and entertainment.

== See also ==
- Listed buildings in Penwortham
- Scheduled monuments in Lancashire
