= Bank of Liverpool =

Financial institution based in Liverpool, England

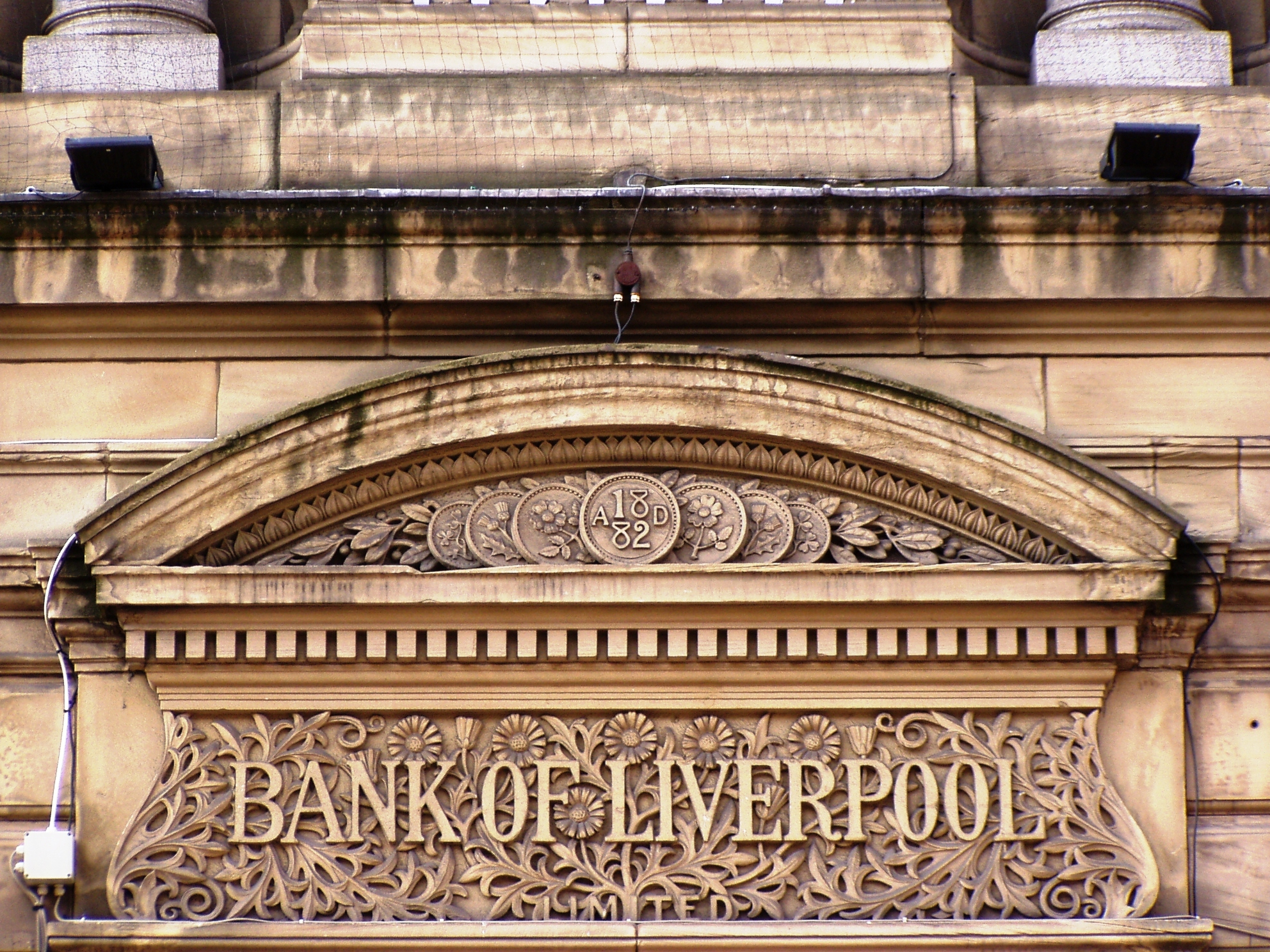
Sign above doorway of Victoria St branch

The Bank of Liverpool was a financial institution founded in 1831 in Liverpool, England.

In 1918, it acquired Martins Bank, and the name of the merged bank became the Bank of Liverpool and Martins Ltd. The name was shortened to Martins Bank Ltd in 1928.

The successor bank was bought by Barclays Bank Ltd in 1969, when all of its 700 branches became branches of Barclays.

== History ==
=== Formation ===
By the time that the Bank of Liverpool was formed, there were already seven private banks in the city, the most prominent of which, Arthur Heywood, had been in existence since 1773. However, in 1826 a new Act of Parliament limited the Bank of England's monopoly of joint stock banking to within 65 miles of London and allowed the creation of new joint stock banks in the provinces. The first of the new joint stock banks to open an office in Liverpool (in 1829) was the Manchester and Liverpool District Bank, regarded as a "needless humiliation" by the local merchants. Encouraged by William Brown, the Bank of Liverpool was formed in 1831 and was the first joint stock bank to have its head office in Liverpool. (Note: Thomas suggested that the first joint stock bank to be "registered" was "apparently" the Bank of Liverpool in 1826, although there is no mention of this in Chandler.)

=== Early history ===
The early shareholders included many prominent Liverpool names including Bibby, Booth, Hornby and Rathbone. William Brown was the first chairman and Joseph Langton the general manager. After opening in temporary premises in Brunswick Street, the Bank purchased the Talbot Inn in Water Street and moved into the converted building in 1832; the Bank stayed in Water Street for the remainder of its independent existence. William Brown's own American firm, William and James Brown, hit temporary financing difficulties in 1837 and the Bank and Arthur Heywood together provided guarantees and were instrumental in obtaining Bank of England support for Brown.

Much of the Bank's business was connected to Liverpool's trade with North America, particularly cotton, and as early as 1837 it was opening accounts with North American banks. Chandler stressed the prudent policy of the directors and it did enable the Bank to weather the frequent financial crises. In particular it remained profitable in 1847 when the similar-sounding Royal Bank of Liverpool failed, also during the American Civil War which disrupted the cotton trade, and the collapse in 1866 of Overend, Gurney and Company. It was the Bank's prudential approach which made it reluctant to assume the protection of limited liability as "unlimited liability encouraged the directors to exercise every care." Eventually, in 1882, the Bank became a limited company.

=== Expansion in Liverpool ===
After assuming limited liability, the Bank became more expansive. It first consolidated its position as the premier Liverpool bank by acquiring Arthur Heywood, Sons and Company in 1883. Heywood was about one fifth the size of the Bank of Liverpool but of much longer history. Arthur and Benjamin Heywood were merchant traders, becoming "experienced in the African trade, engaged to some extent in privateering and had their Letters of Marque". Heywoods became one of the merchants to whom funds could be trusted and in 1773 they became bankers as well as merchants. Arthur Heywood, Sons (Benjamin had left to start a bank in Manchester) became one of the leading private banks in Liverpool and its accounts were to include the Corporation of Liverpool, the Mersey Docks and Harbour Board, and the Liverpool Cathedral.

It was only in 1881 that the Bank had opened its first branch, in Victoria Street but following the Heywood acquisition the Bank opened a further nine branches within a two-year period. In 1888 the Bank took over the Liverpool business of Brown, Shipley & Co. when the latter moved its headquarters to London. The following year it acquired the Liverpool Commercial Banking Company, a bank founded in 1832, and at the time of its acquisition, a little smaller than Heywood.

=== Creation of a regional bank ===
Once the Bank had established itself as the leading bank in Liverpool, it began a series of acquisitions that was to take it into the regions, before eventually establishing a London presence in 1918 with the acquisition of Martins Bank. Each of the acquired banks was itself the product of its own local amalgamations.

1893 The Kendal Bank. Two Kendal banks were formed in 1788, namely Wakefield's Bank and Joseph Maude's Kendal Bank (with Christopher Wilson and Thomas Crewdson), which amalgamated in 1840, later acquiring other local banks. By 1893 the Kendal Bank had 11 full branches and 15 sub-branches in Westmorland and Cumberland.

1906 The Craven Bank was founded in the Craven district of Yorkshire in 1791 by long-standing local families. At the time of its acquisition its head office was at Skipton and there were 14 branches, taking the Bank of Liverpool's total to 71.

1911 The Carlisle and Cumberland Bank was formed in 1836, Carlisle being "entirely destitute of a native joint stock bank establishment". By the turn of the century it was having difficulty competing with the larger banks and sought a merger.

1914-18 The North Eastern Banking Company was, east of the Pennines, the equivalent of Bank of Liverpool to the west. North Eastern was a later creation, the prospectus for the joint stock bank being issued in 1872. The two principal offices were in Newcastle upon Tyne and Middlesbrough; the leading shareholder Sir Andrew Noble; managing director Benjamin Noble; and Glyn's Bank supplied the company secretary. Branch opening was immediately accelerated by the purchase of the Alnwick and County Bank in 1875 taking the total number of branches to 24. The second and last bank to be acquired by the North Eastern was Dale, Young and Company in 1892. Dale and Company had been founded by John Brodrick Dale, already an experienced banker, in 1858 and he remained senior partner until his Bank's acquisition. Succession issues at the North Eastern led to its management approaching the Bank of Liverpool with a view to merging. The choices for both banks were either to join up with a London bank or to merge, creating a bank strong enough to move into London in its own right. In 1914 the two banks agreed the merger (although, in practice, it was a takeover by Liverpool) and formed the largest English bank with its head office outside London; the North Eastern, headquartered in Newcastle, brought with it 72 branches and 27 sub-branches. Although the merger was agreed in 1914, the onset of war meant it was not effected until 1918.

=== Move to London ===
The next stage in the bank's development was to seek a London presence and, in particular, to gain a seat in the London Bankers' Clearing House. Unsuccessful overtures were made to both Glyn's (the bank's London agent), and to Cocks, Biddulph. However, the bank's chairman "was successful in persuading the chairman ... of Martins Bank to agree to amalgamation and to accept the primacy of the Bank of Liverpool". Martins in turn recognised its need to expand into the provinces and the acquisition of Martins duly took place in 1918. Although Martins was much smaller than the Bank of Liverpool, the goodwill of its name and its seat on the Clearing House, meant that it was the only one of Liverpool's acquisition to preserve its name; the enlarged entity was called the Bank of Liverpool and Martins and when the name was eventually shortened in 1928, it was to just Martins Bank. The increased standing possessed by the Bank of Liverpool following its entry into the clearing house system then persuaded the private West End firm of Cocks, Biddulph to agree to its acquisition. By 1919, the Bank of Liverpool had become a national bank but one still based in the provinces.

=== Bank of Liverpool and Martins ===
Fresh from its acquisition of Martins and Cocks, Biddulph in London, the bank sought to consolidate its position in the north of England. The purchase of the Palatine Bank in 1919 was the first example of a Liverpool bank buying one based in Manchester and gave the bank a presence in Manchester for the first time. The Palatine had been established in 1899, in response to Manchester businessmen objecting to local banks falling under the control of London institutions.

The following year the Bank bought Halifax Commercial Banking, a regional Yorkshire bank with roots back to the 1790s. It was constituted as a joint-stock bank in 1836 under the Halifax Commercial name, its immediate predecessor having been Rawdon Briggs and Sons. On its acquisition by Bank of Liverpool it had 17 branches.

In 1928, the Bank of Liverpool and Martins made its largest regional acquisition, the Lancashire & Yorkshire Bank. In 1863 the newly formed Alliance Bank of London had opened two branches, in Liverpool and Manchester; nine years later the failure of the Alliance led to the disposal of the branches. The Manchester manager, John Mills, obtained local support and a new company, the ambitiously named Lancashire and Yorkshire Bank was formed in 1872 and took over the business of Alliance Bank's Manchester office. The Lancashire & Yorkshire steadily built up a branch network before embarking in 1888 on the first of its many acquisitions – Bury Banking, followed by the Preston Union Bank (1893), Liverpool's Adelphi Bank (1899), West Riding Union Banking (1902) and Mercantile Bank of Lancashire (1904). The bank brought with it 151 offices and deposits of £23m against Liverpool's £63m. One of the conditions was that if Lancashire & Yorkshire was to lose its identity, then Liverpool should lose its, hence the shortening of the name to Martins Bank.

=== Martins Bank ===
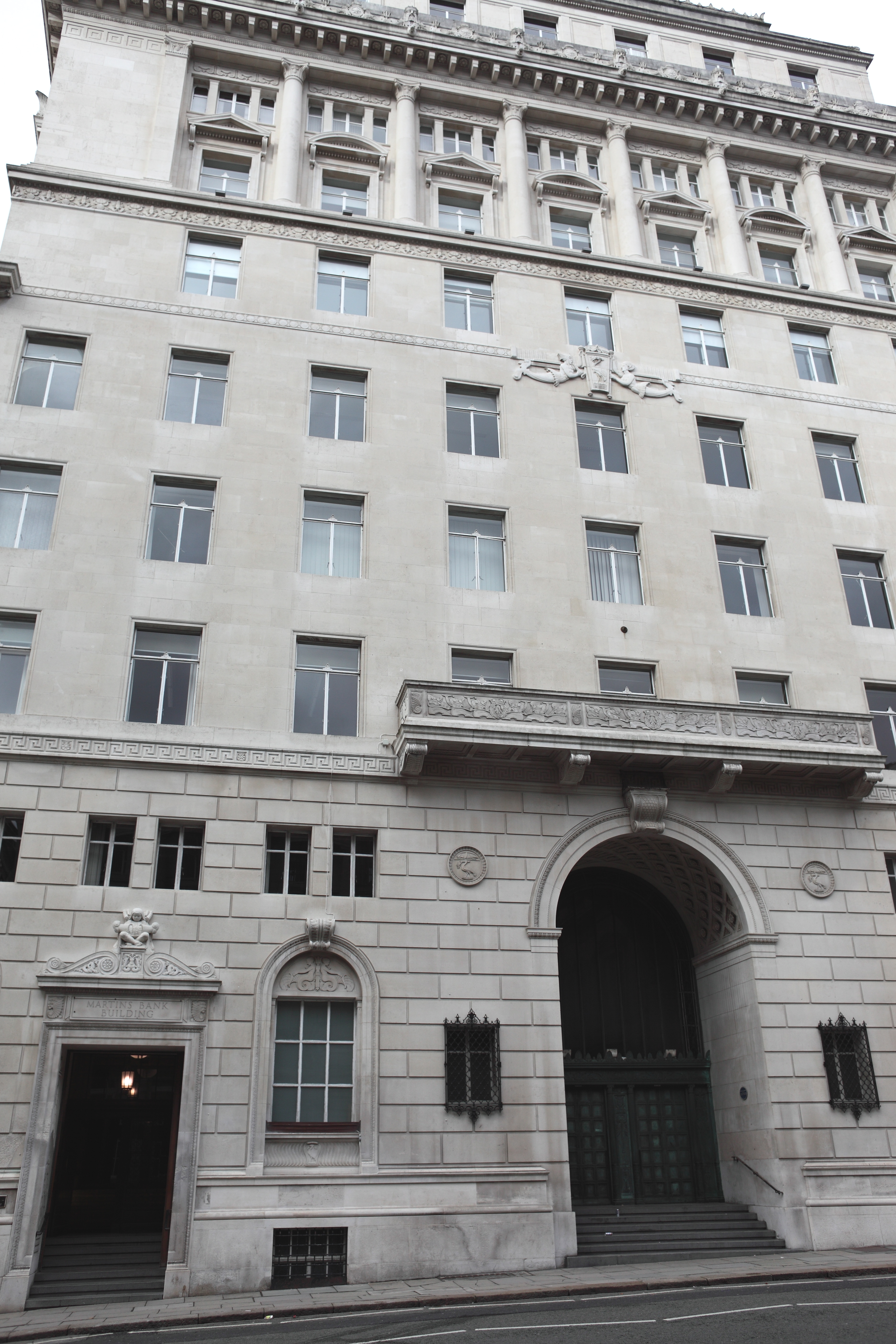
New headquarters building, at 4 Water St. Liverpool. It was designed by the architect Herbert James Rowse in the classical revival style.

Now operating under the shortened Martins name, the bank completed building the new London office in 1930 and the new Liverpool head office in 1932. New branches were regularly opened in the south of the country to complement the extensive network in the north. The period of acquisitions was over for Martins, the only exceptions being those of the British Mutual Bank in 1951 and Lewis's Bank in 1958. Otherwise, the bank continued to expand organically with 62 new branches being opened between 1945 and 1957.

Finally, Martins, the last remaining independent regional bank, itself succumbed to acquisition. A proposed three-way merger between Barclays, Lloyds Bank and Martins was rejected by the Monopolies Commission but no objection was raised to Martins being acquired by Barclays alone. In 1969 the Liverpool-based bank lost its independence to Barclays.
