= Low Wood Gunpowder Works =

Gunpowder mill in Cumbria, England

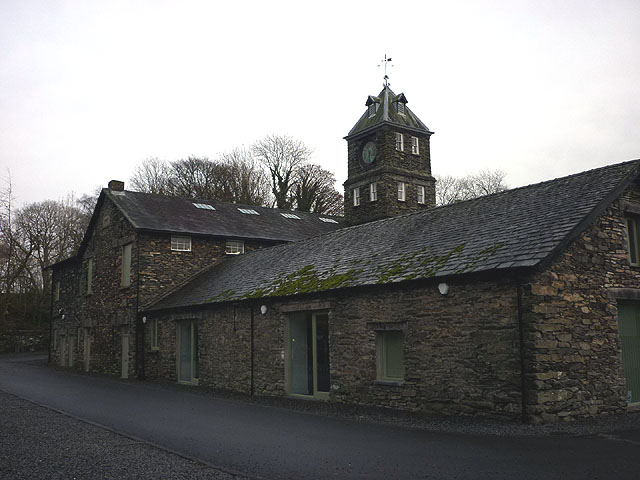

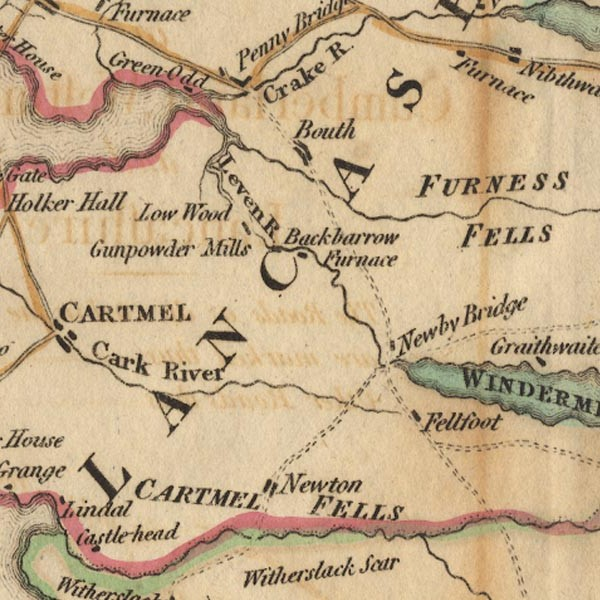
Low Wood Gunpowder Mills, on a map of 1821 (map orientation is north to the right)

Low Wood Gunpowder Works (also Lowwood) was a gunpowder mill founded in Furness, England, at the end of the 18th century. It became a significant supplier, and survived as a business until taken over by Imperial Chemical Industries around 1930. The works has been disused since 1935.

The mill was set up on an estuary site, for sea access, on the River Leven. Initially it was called Daye Barker & Co., the founding partners being Daye Barker, James King, Christopher Wilson and Joseph Fayrer. The surviving Clock Tower Works is a Grade II* Listed Building.

Gunpowder production in the area (now southern Cumbria) had begun in 1764, with a mill at Sedgwick built by John Wakefield of Kendal. An important aspect was the supply of the triangular trade, in particular of Liverpool merchants engaged in it. The Low Wood works started to operate in 1798.

== Background ==
The Lowwood site, near Haverthwaite, had been used earlier for a forge of the 17th century, under the alternate name Burnbarrow (closed down by 1620). In the 18th century Isaac Wilkinson set up a furnace for iron production. A pre-existing weir may have been used by the forge. Factors favouring gunpowder mill sites in what is now Cumbria included the existing charcoal industry and water power.

Daye Barker left his cotton business at nearby Backbarrow in 1798. Daye Barker & Co was issued a gunpowder licence on 2 October of that year.

== Early days ==
The mill made black powder, mixing imported sulphur and saltpetre with charcoal, which initially was made locally. It adopted the suggestion of government adviser Richard Watson, to control the conditions under which charcoal was prepared, as charcoal cylinders, for greater reliability. The large demand created for charcoal was met from coppices on Windermere, Coniston Water and Esthwaite Water. The best woods from the point of view of powder grain size were juniper (local name "savin"), followed by alder and silver birch.

The Leven was navigable nearly to Low Wood Bridge, which may have been erected by the company. Fayrer, who died in 1801, was a former slaver captain, and was the company's agent in Liverpool, an important export market for gunpowder in particular to West Africa. He also was in charge of the import via Ulverston of raw materials. Wilson's uncle Thomas Parke operated there. Fayrer's role was taken over by the firm of Preston & Winder, with Gerrard Preston, a slaver captain and merchant from Lancaster. He had died by 1804, his firm having been wound up at the start of 1803.

== Later years ==
After the Slave Trade Act 1807 the company switched largely to the manufacture of blasting powder, a market in which it became prominent. Daye Barker died in 1835. He was replaced in the company by his son of the same name.

A narrow gauge tramway was constructed for the mill. The normal transportation arrangement was: to a store at Roudsea, then by sloop to Greenodd or Ulverston. The company had a magazine at Liscard in the Wirral, licensed under the Gunpowder Act 1772. A branch line to the Furness Railway was opened in 1869. In the 1880s Bark Barn in Roudsea Wood near Haverthwaite may have been used as a store. The safety record was poor, with explosions occurring to 1903.

The younger Daye Barker left the partnership in 1858. The Lowwood Company became a limited company in 1863. It was taken over in 1882 by W. H. Wakefield & Co, who operated the Gatebeck Gunpowder Mills near Kendal.
