= Christopher Wilson (businessman) =

English businessman and political activist

Christopher Wilson (1765–1845) was an English businessman, banker and political activist of anti-reform views.

== Early life ==
He was the eldest son of Christopher Wilson and his wife Margaret Parke. He attended Hawkshead School with William Wordsworth.

Wilson went into the cotton spinning trade, near Staveley. He had a business interest in gunpowder, being a partner in the Low Wood Gunpowder Mill at Haverthwaite. This mill was a major supplier of export gunpowder for Africa to Liverpool, up to the Slave Trade Act 1807. Wilson was connected to Liverpool through his uncle Thomas Parke.

Wilson joined the Kendal Bank, founded by his father with Joseph Maude and Thomas Crewdson, as a partner, in 1795. He became senior partner in 1812, when the bank became Wilson, Crewdson & Co.

== Election of 1818 ==
The 1818 election for Westmorland was closely contested by Henry Brougham, against two Tories of the locally predominant Lowther family, Viscount Lowther and Henry Lowther. Wilson acted as chairman of the local Lowther Committee. He held an anti-Reform meeting; while John Wakefield II, of the rival banking family, held a pro-Brougham meeting. The Kendal Chronicle alleged that Wilson, a commissioner for the land tax, had employed "sly cunning", after Brougham had repeatedly claimed in Parliament that Wilson had delayed returning assessments in order to disenfranchise reform voters.

Matters became rowdy, with a Reform mob setting up a barricade in Kendal to keep out the Lowther party arriving from Dallam Tower to the south. At this time Wordsworth, whose politics were Tory, commented in a letter to Lord Lonsdale, Viscount Lowther's father, that Wilson was wealthy, but not popular. Both Lowther candidates were returned in the two-member constituency.

== Later life ==
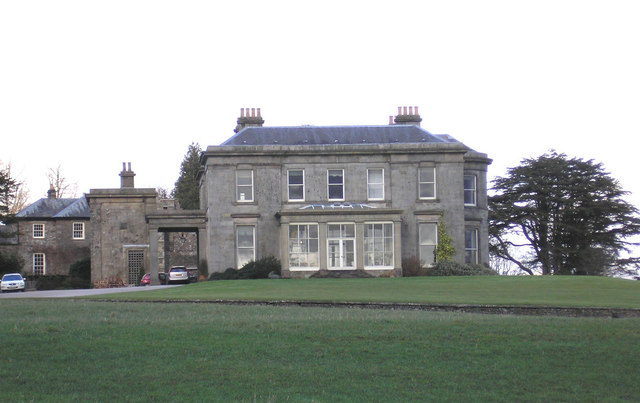
Rigmaden Park

Wilson lived at Abbot Hall. He then bought Mansergh manor from Charles Satterthwaite in 1821. After the Panic of 1825 he sold out of the Kendal Bank, in 1826. He had the old manor house at Mansergh, called Rigmaden, rebuilt (1828), to a design by George Webster. An enclosure act was passed in 1837 for Mansergh, where Wilson built and endowed a school.

Thomas Chalmers, who encountered Wilson in the 1820s socially, described him as "banker, with £10,000 a year, a great landed proprietor, a magistrate, and most intimately and intelligently acquainted with pauperism". He later quoted correspondence with Wilson, on the select vestry principle, in his work on poor relief, in The Christian and Civic Economy of Large Towns (1823).

In 1837 Christopher Wilson, as a magistrate, took part in an enquiry in Kendal ordered by the Poor Law Commission, on a cruelty complaint raised by William Carus Wilson of Casterton, against the Board of Guardians of the Union workhouse.

== Family ==
Wilson married Catherine, daughter of James Wilson J.P. of Kendal and Lambrigg by his wife, Jenny Anne Crumpstone of Ambleside and they had 14 children: five sons and nine daughters. The eldest son Edward became chairman of the Bank of Westmorland, when it was set up in 1833. He married Anne Clementina, daughter of Thomas Sidney Beckwith. He was succeeded by his brother William Wilson (1810–1880) who married Maria Letitia Hulme (1817–1873) at Stoke Gabriel, Devon in 1843 and had three sons and five daughters. Their eldest son Christopher Wyndham Wilson "Kit" (1844–1918) inherited the Rigmaden Park Estate in 1880.
