= James Parke, 1st Baron Wensleydale =

British barrister and judge (1782–1868)

The Right Honourable The Lord Wensleydale PC
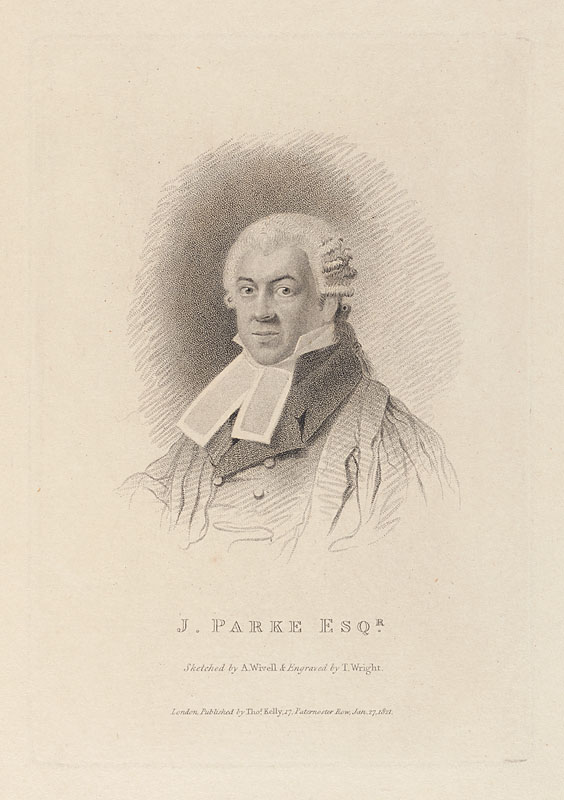

Court of King's Bench
- In office 28 November 1828 – 29 April 1834
- Preceded by: Sir George Holyroyd
- Succeeded by: John Williams

Court of Exchequer
- In office 29 April 1834 – December 1855
- Preceded by: John Williams
- Succeeded by: Lord Bramwell

Lord of Appeal in Ordinary

Personal details
- Born: James Parke; 22 March 1782
- Died: 25 February 1868 (aged 85)
- Spouse: Cecilia Barlow
- Parent: Thomas Parke (father)
- Education: Trinity College, Cambridge
- Profession: Barrister, Judge

James Parke, 1st Baron Wensleydale PC (22 March 1782 – 25 February 1868) was a British barrister and judge. After an education at The King's School, Macclesfield and Trinity College, Cambridge he studied under a special pleader, before being called to the Bar by the Inner Temple in 1813. Although not a particularly distinguished barrister, he was appointed to the Court of King's Bench on 28 November 1828, made a Privy Counsellor in 1833 and, a year later, a Baron of the Exchequer. He resigned his post in 1855, angered by the passing of the Common Law Procedure Acts, but was recalled by the government, who gave him a peerage as Baron Wensleydale of Walton to allow him to undertake the judicial functions of the House of Lords, a role he fulfilled until his death on 25 February 1868.

== Early life and education ==
Parke was born on 22 March 1782 in Highfield, near Liverpool, to Thomas Parke, a merchant, and his wife Anne. He studied at The King's School, Macclesfield before matriculating to Trinity College, Cambridge on 28 February 1799, where he won the Craven scholarship, Sir William Browne's gold medal, and was fifth wrangler and senior chancellor's medallist in classics. He gained a Bachelor of Arts in 1802 and a Master of Arts in 1804. Although admitted to Lincoln's Inn on 10 May 1803, he transferred to the Inner Temple on 22 April 1812, and after studying with a special pleader was called to the Bar in 1813.

== Career ==
Parke's early career as a barrister was not noted as particularly brilliant, but he was successful; in 1820, for example, he was junior counsel for the Pains and Penalties Bill 1820 against Caroline of Brunswick. On 28 November 1828 he succeeded Sir George Holroyd as a judge of the Court of King's Bench, a great achievement for somebody who had not even qualified as a King's Counsel, and he was knighted on 1 December 1828. In 1833 he was made a Privy Councillor, and on 29 April 1834 was transferred, along with Edward Hall Alderson, to the Court of Exchequer, succeeding and being succeeded as a judge of the Court of King's Bench by John Williams.

Parke's work in the Court of Exchequer has led to him being called "one of the greatest of English judges; had he comprehended the principles of equity as fully as he did the principles of the common law, he might fairly be called the greatest. His mental power, his ability to grasp difficult points, to disentangle complicated facts, and to state the law clearly, have seldom been surpassed. No judgments delivered during this period are of greater service to the student of law than his". He was criticised for being too respectful of authority and unwilling to overturn precedent; John Coleridge accused him of being dedicated to the form of the law rather than the substance.

In 1854, Parke was appointed to the Royal Commission for Consolidating the Statute Law, a royal commission to consolidate existing statutes and enactments of English law.

The Common Law Procedure Act 1854 and Common Law Procedure Act 1855 led to his resignation from the Exchequer in disgust, but his reputation was such that the government recalled him by granting him a life peerage, that of Baron Wensleydale, of Wensleydale, in the North Riding of Yorkshire on 16 January 1856. There was a question at the time of whether the letters patent, which granted him a peerage "for the term of his natural life", allowed him to sit in the House of Lords; it was eventually decided that they did not, and a second set was issued with the usual form for Baron Wensleydale, of Walton, in the County Palatine of Lancaster on 23 July 1856. This was irrelevant, since he had no sons able to take the peerage even if it was not a life appointment. He sat as part of the Appellate Committee of the House of Lords until his death on 25 February 1868.

== Personal life ==
In 1817 he married Cecilia, the daughter of Samuel F. Barlow of Middlethorpe, Yorkshire. They had three children who survived childhood, all daughters:

- Mary Parke (died 26 August 1843), an accomplished artist, married Charles Howard, a son of George Howard, 6th Earl of Carlisle, and was the mother of the painter and arts patron George Howard, 9th Earl of Carlisle.
- Cecilia Anne Parke (died 20 April 1845), married Sir Matthew Ridley, 4th Baronet, and was the mother of Matthew Ridley, 5th Bnt (who was created Viscount Ridley and Baron Wensleydale in 1900).
- Charlotte Alice Parke (died 5 January 1908), married William Lowther, a grandson of William Lowther, 1st Earl of Lonsdale.

== Arms ==
Coat of arms of James Parke, 1st Baron Wensleydale
Crest A talbot’s head couped Gules gorged with a plain collar and pierced on the breast with a pheon Or. Escutcheon Gules on a pale engrailed plain cottised Argent three stags’ heads cabossed of the field attired Or. Supporters On either side a stag Gules attired and gorged with a collar therefrom pendent a portcullis Or. Motto Justitiae Tenax (Holding Fast To Justice)

== See also ==
- Appellate Jurisdiction Act 1876

== Bibliography ==
- Foss, Edward (1865). Tabulae curiales. London: J. Murray. OCLC 7481008.
- Foss, Edward (1870). A Biographical Dictionary of the Justices of England (1066 - 1870). Spottiswoode and Company. OCLC 181068114.
- "Great English Judges. Exchequer". Harvard Law Review. 11 (3). The Harvard Law Review Association. 1897. ISSN 0017-811X.

Legal offices
Preceded by George Holroyd	Justice of the Court of King's Bench; 28 November 1828 – 29 April 1834	Succeeded by John Williams
Preceded by John Williams	Baron of the Exchequer; 29 April 1834 – December 1855	Succeeded by George Wishere
Peerage of the United Kingdom
New creation	Baron Wensleydale; 1856–1868	Extinct
