= Thomas Parke (merchant) =

English slave trader

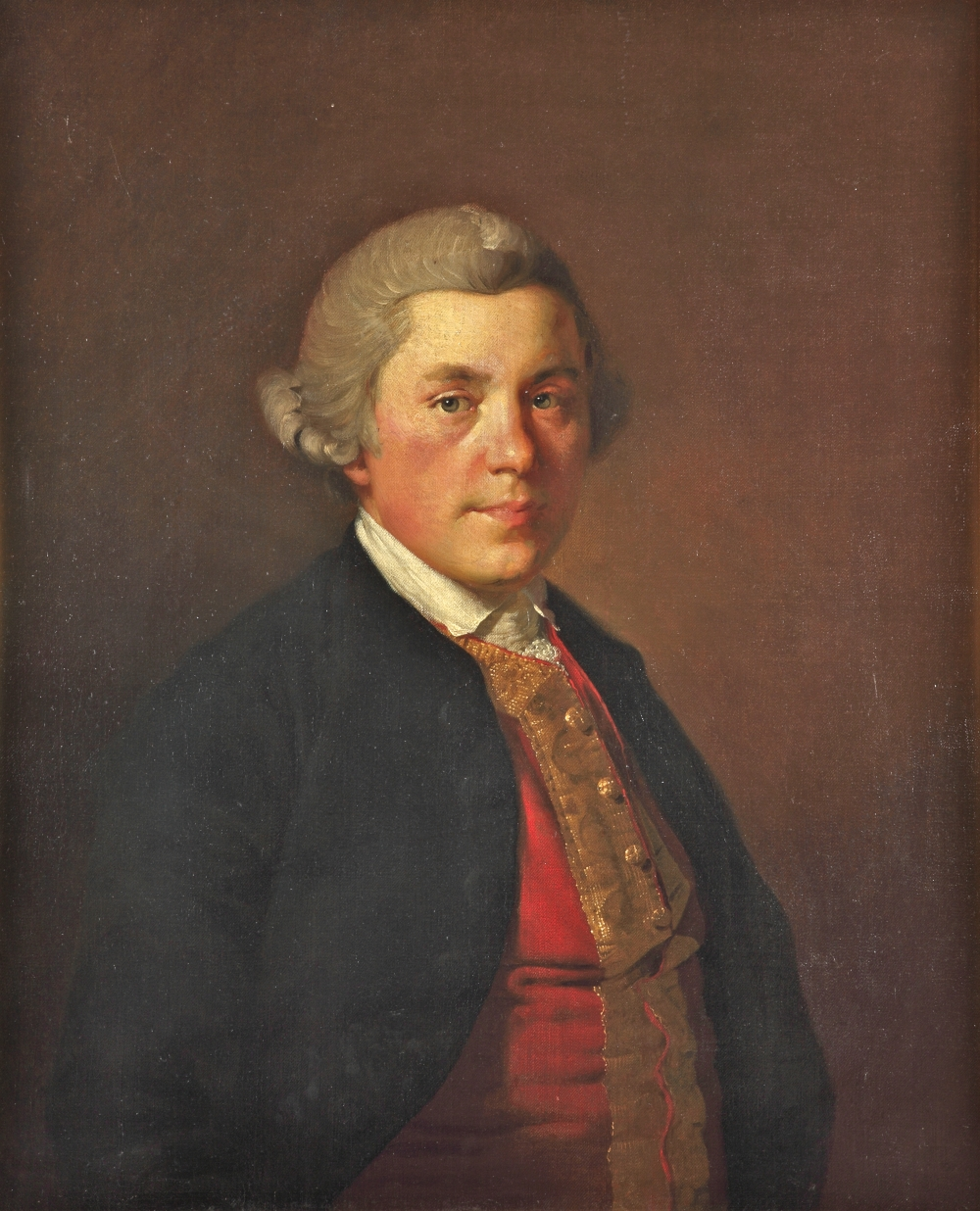
- Thomas Parke, 1769 portrait by Joseph Wright of Derby
- Born: c. 1729; Swaledale, England
- Died: 1819 (aged 88–89); Liverpool, England
- Occupations: Slave trader, merchant, banker and privateer
- Spouse: Anne Parke

Thomas Parke (1729/30 – 1819) was a Liverpool slave trader, merchant, banker and privateer. He was part of the complex network of business interests and finance behind the African and Atlantic slave trade of the later 18th century.

== Early life ==
Originally from Swaledale, Yorkshire, he was the son of Thomas and Hannah Parke of Low Row; his father was a hosier and lead miner. He went into business as a linen merchant, initially with his brother John. His brother-in-law Christopher Wilson I of Kendal was another hosier, and Thomas Parke's merchant ventures included exporting Wilson's goods to North America.

== Slave trade ==
Parke invested in the Atlantic slave trade through many ventures; he withdrew from it in 1792. Another business partner was Wilson's son, Christopher Wilson II, of the Low Wood Gunpowder Company, gunpowder being part of the West Africa trade.

Parke was a member of the Company of Merchants trading to Africa, of Liverpool. He was in business with Arthur Heywood. Parke & Heywood were involved in two slaving ventures in 1783/4, and in all in 50 journeys in the "triangular trade". The firm was significant as a major player in the local insurance trade, and its business had many dealings in common with the partnership of Thomas Staniforth and Joseph Brooks (junior). Heywood & Parke became one of the ten largest Liverpool firms (period 1783 to 1793) responsible for the trade of West African slaves to the West Indies. Their ventures employed the slaver Captain Joseph Fayrer.

Among Parke's clients for slaves were Rainford, Blundell & Rainford of Kingston, Jamaica. The percentage of Liverpool's slave trade in 1790 attributable to Thomas Parke and Co., of five partners, has been given as 1.1%. Parke reduced his investment in the direct trade, and concentrated more on the production of cotton goods for it, a business in which one of his sons was involved.

Parke was a director of the Liverpool fire insurance office established in 1777. He was a partner in Heywood's Bank.

== Personal life ==
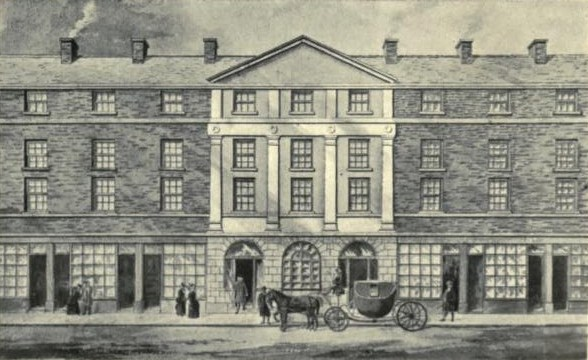
Heywood's Bank in the 18th century.

Parke married Anne, daughter of William Preston.

Their sons included:

- Thomas John, the eldest. He married Bridget Colquitt, the daughter of John Colquitt IV. He was a partner in William Gregson, Sons, Parke & Morland. With Thomas Staniforth, Richard Watt and Joseph Jackson, he founded Old Swan Charity School (1792).
- John and Preston Fryer, who were bankrupts. John was in the textile ("African check") business, but failed, and took a position as consul to Iceland.
- James Parke, 1st Baron Wensleydale.

Their daughter Alice married Sitwell Sitwell. Another daughter Anne married John Croome Smythe.

Parke lived in Water Street; later he moved to Duke Street, and resided at Highfield House, West Derby, Liverpool, previously owned by Charlotte Murray, Duchess of Atholl, which he bought about 1781.

== Sources ==
- Richardson, David (2007). Liverpool and Transatlantic Slavery. Liverpool, UK: Liverpool University Press. ISBN 978-1-84631-066-9.
- Williams, Gomer (1897). History of the Liverpool Privateers. UK: Liverpool University Press.
