= George Holroyd =

George Holroyd may refer to:

- George Sowley Holroyd (1758–1831), English lawyer and justice
- George Holroyd, 2nd Earl of Sheffield (1802–1876), British politician
