= Henry Murray (disambiguation) =

Henry Murray (1893–1988) was an American psychologist.

Henry Murray may also refer to:

- Henry Murray (Australian politician) (1844–1927)
- Henry Murray (playwright), American playwright
- Henry Murray (British politician) (1767–1805), Scottish soldier and administrator
- Henry Murray (British Army officer) (1784–1850), English officer who fought in the Napoleonic Wars
- Henry Leigh Murray (1820–1870), English actor
- Henry Murray (athlete) (1886–1943), New Zealand athlete and architect
- Henry Murray (cricketer) (1907–1979), English cricketer
- Henry Murray (VC), Australian recipient of the Victoria Cross
- Henry Murray (taxidermist), British taxidermist

== See also ==
- Henry Murray-Anderdon (1848–1922), English cricket administrator
- Harry Murray (disambiguation)
