= Craven Bank =

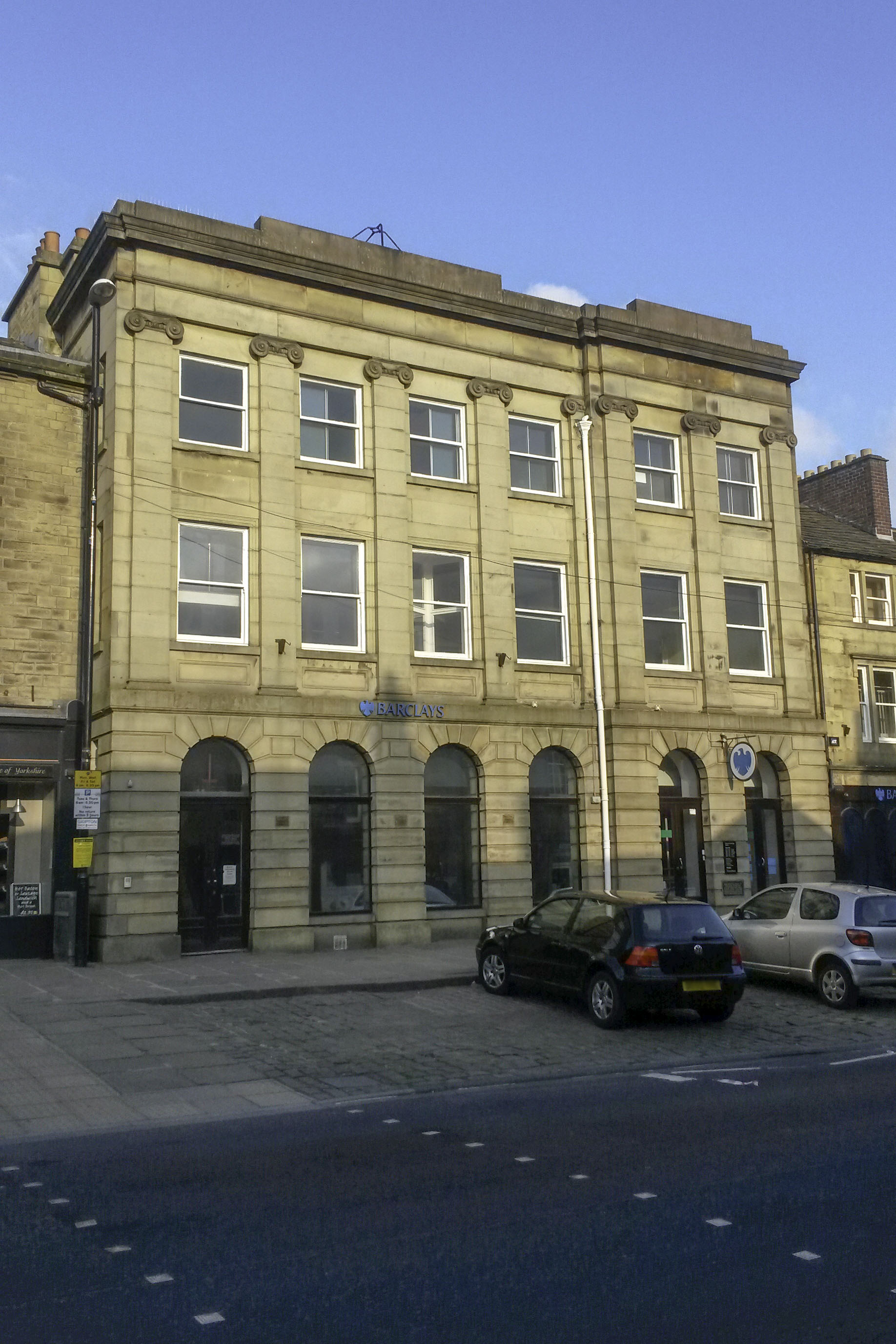
- 49 High Street, Skipton, head office of the Craven Bank 1880–1906, now the Skipton branch of Barclays Bank.
- Industry: Banking
- Founded: 1791 in Settle, West Riding of Yorkshire, England
- Defunct: 27 April 1906
- Fate: Acquired by the Bank of Liverpool
- Successor: Bank of Liverpool
- Headquarters: Settle (1791–1880); Skipton (1880–1906)
- Area served: Craven, West Riding of Yorkshire; East Lancashire

The Craven Bank was a financial institution founded in 1791 in Settle, North Yorkshire to provide banking services in the area. Incorporated as the Craven Bank Ltd - a joint stock company - in 1880, the bank amalgamated with the Bank of Liverpool in 1906.

== History ==
Banking in England prior to the nineteenth century was a largely unregulated industry and outside of London virtually anyone could offer financial services and the burgeoning Industrial Revolution increased demand for local banking. In 1791 William Alcock, a Skipton solicitor; William Birkbeck and his cousin, John, who were merchants in Settle along with John Peart a solicitor from Grassington and William Lawson of Giggleswick entered into a partnership as the Craven Bank. Joining them and providing access to the London banking industry was Joseph Smith a City of London banker.

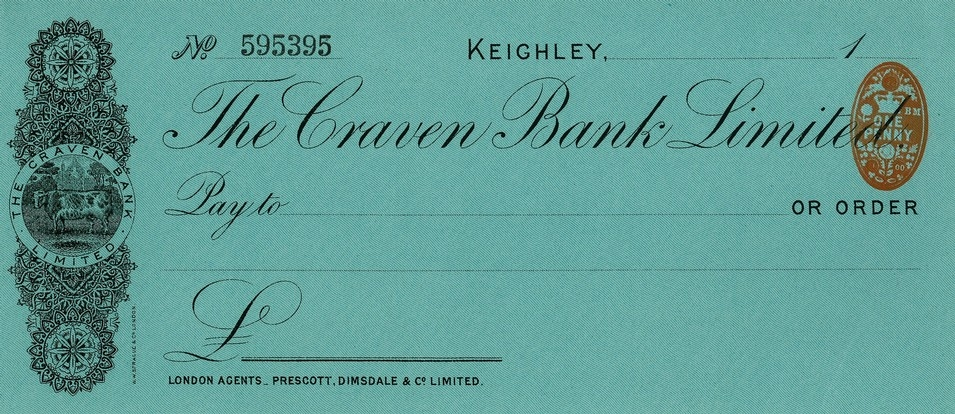
An early 20th-century cheque issued by the Keighley branch, showing the Craven Heifer emblem adopted by the bank

The bank was based in Settle and early banknotes issued by the bank incorporated a picture of Castlebergh, the hill that overlooks Settle but in the early nineteenth century the bank adopted the Craven Heifer as its emblem and its appearance on the note and cheques issued by the bank, the bank's notes were colloquially referred to as "the notes wi' the cow on".

The banking crisis of 1825 led to a run on many banks and the Craven Bank avoided this partially through public demonstrations of confidence published in local newspapers. The partnership of Chippendale, Netherwood and Carr who traded as the Skipton Bank were not as lucky and the Skipton Bank was acquired by the Craven Bank in 1834.

The Companies Act 1879 (42 & 43 Vict. c. 76) allowed the shareholders of banking companies the protection of limited liability, and in 1880 the partners of the bank decided that the future of the bank was best assured by becoming a joint-stock company rather than a private company. Capital in the new limited company was authorised for £1,200,000 issued in 40,000 shares at £30 each, at the same time the decision was taken to move the head office of the bank to Skipton.

By the turn of the twentieth century many small banks amalgamated to form bigger concerns. The Craven Bank was no exception and in March 1906 the board proposed a merger with the Bank of Liverpool, a motion that was carried by the shareholders of both banks in April 1906.

From a single bank in 1791, by the time of the merger with the Bank of Liverpool, the Craven Bank had 14 branches and 26 sub-branches across the West Riding of Yorkshire and East Lancashire.
