= Harold Murray =

Harold Murray may refer to:

- H. J. R. Murray (Harold James Ruthven Murray), educationalist and historian
- J. Harold Murray, American baritone singer and actor
- Harold Murray (bowls), Australian lawn bowls player

== See also ==
- Harry Murray (disambiguation)
