= Henry Murray (taxidermist) =

British taxidermist

Henry Murray was a British taxidermist and founder of the taxidermy firm Murray of Carnforth. The business was established in 1872 by Henry Murray and continued with his son Albert James until Albert retired in 1961, originally trading as H. Murray and later as H. Murray and son from premises in Scotland Rd., Carnforth.

The Murrays produced taxidermy of the highest quality equal with other top class taxidermist of that era. Their output was various, producing work for museums, most notably Kendal, decorative cases for the private market and trophies for the hunting fraternity. The most often seen cases are the "picture frame" type which Murray is renowned for, very well executed with a painted background. Not as numerous but just as well presented are his all glass cases containing singles, pairs or family groups, mostly to be found in museums. Kendal Museum houses the finest collection of Murray taxidermy including extinct species. Less often seen are cases of the box type and with glass sides and front and also domes. The Murrays usually labelled their work. Cases having a large label on the back and a small label on the inside, either on the background or groundwork, there are exceptions as unlabelled Murray cases can be found.
