= Kendal College =

Location
- Milnthorpe Road; Kendal, Cumbria, LA9 5AY; England
- Coordinates: 54.3178°N 2.7471°W

Information
- Type: Further Education
- Motto: Creating Bright Futures
- Local authority: Cumbria
- Principal: Jason Turton
- Gender: Mixed
- Age: 16+
- Website: Kendal College

Kendal College is a further education college situated in Kendal on the edge of the Lake District National Park. The college provides a range of training and education programmes, including Further Education, Higher Education and training courses to support local employers, as well as more diverse work such as hospitality consultancy for Cambridge University.

The college has over 4,000 students and employs over 150 staff.

In the college's last full Ofsted Inspection in 2023, it was graded Requires improvement.

The college is a partner of the University of Cumbria and University of Central Lancashire and delivers a range of Higher Education courses, including Foundation Degrees and teaching qualifications.

The college consists of three campuses, the Main Site on Milnthorpe Road at the South side of Kendal The Arts and Media Campus at the North end of the town and The Westmorland Campus situated in the centre of town and above the Westmorland shopping centre.

On 15 May 2008 the college officially opened its £12.9 million new build project on the college's main site. The new build is the first capital development that the college has embarked on since the main campus was originally constructed in 1971. On 20 May 2009 the new build was shortlisted for the Learning and Skills Council / Royal Institute of British Architects Further Education Design Excellence Awards 2009. The college won the 2009 SCALA Civic Building of the Year Award.

The Arts and Media Campus comprises the Allen Building where creative and expressive arts are taught; Wildman Studios where arts courses are taught; Kendal Museum, which is managed by the college as part of a 10-year agreement with South Lakeland District Council; The Box, a 120-seat, a performance venue for drama and technical theatre students; and Castle Dairy, a 14th-century Grade I listed building, which has been renovated for use as an art gallery and cafe, staffed by Kendal College hospitality and catering apprentices and officially opened on 18 October 2011 by Davie Starkey.

The college also manages Kendal Museum as part of a 10-year partnership agreement with South Lakeland District Council.

== Locations ==
- Main Site: Milnthorpe Road, Kendal, Cumbria, LA9 5AY.
- The Arts and Media Campus - Beezon Road, Kendal, Cumbria.
- Westmorland Campus:Market Place, Kendal, Cumbria, LA9 4TN
