= Harry Murray (disambiguation) =

Harry Murray was an Australian VC recipient.

Harry Murray may also refer to:

- Harry K. Murray, member of the Mississippi Senate
- Harry Murray (Emmerdale)
- Harry Murray, founder of Ulster Workers' Council
- Harry Murray, one half of the comedy duo Murray and Mooney

== See also ==
- Henry Murray (disambiguation)
- Harold Murray (disambiguation)
