= Kendal Museum =

Local museum in Kendal, England

Coordinates: 54.3315°N 2.7420°W

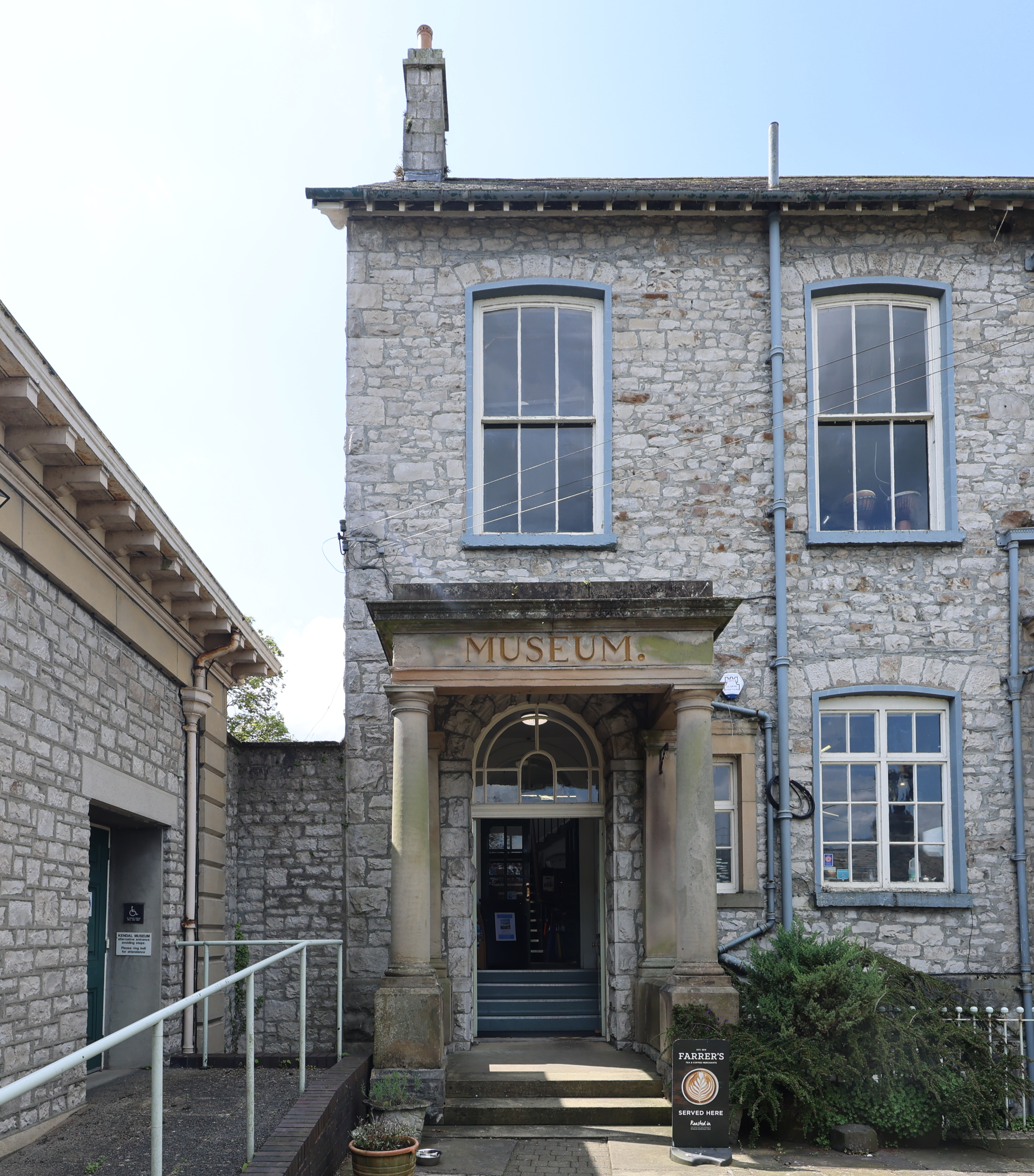
Entrance to Kendal Museum, which was established in 1796

Kendal Museum is a local museum in Kendal, Cumbria, on the edge of the Lake District in northwest England. It was founded in 1796 and includes collections of local archaeology, history, and geology, and a natural history collection from around the globe. The museum also features a changing programme of temporary exhibitions and displays, events, walks, and talks. The museum has a large natural history taxidermy collection, including work from Henry Murray. It features a stuffed polar bear and a model of a dodo.

The museum is open three days a week from Thursday to Saturday, with a charge of £5 (adults) and £2 (5-18's) for admission, with Under 5's going free. The opening hours are 9.30am to 4.45pm with last entry at 4pm.

In April 2011, Kendal Museum achieved the Visitor Attraction Quality Assurance Scheme assessment, awarded by Visit England.

Kendal Museum is managed by Kendal College on behalf of South Lakeland District Council. and is part of the Arts and Media campus at the North End of Kendal.
