= Christopher Wilson (merchant) =

Christopher Wilson (1731–1804) was an English merchant and banker in Kendal.

== Life ==
He was the eldest son of Thomas Wilson of Natland, a hosier, and Ellen Burrough or Burrow. He inherited land and property from his father. Going into business himself as a hosier, he started to invest in linsey manufacture by 1766. From beginnings buying fleeces to dye, he built up a merchant connection in textiles, and gunpowder, though partnerships, sales travellers, and exports. Wilson built Blindbeck House in Kendal, and his family moved there in 1785.

Wilson founded the Kendal Bank (trading as Maude, Wilson & Crewdson), with Joseph Maude and Thomas Crewdson, on 1 January 1788 (Crewdson was a cousin to Wilson). This bank opened in Farrers House, Stramongate (moving to Highgate in 1792) simultaneously with John Wakefield's bank; the two banks merged in 1840. Wilson served as alderman of Kendal, being mayor in 1798–9.

== Family ==
Wilson married in 1757 Margaret Parke, daughter of Thomas and Hannah Parke of Low Row, and sister of Thomas Parke of Liverpool. They had two sons, one being Christopher, and three daughters.

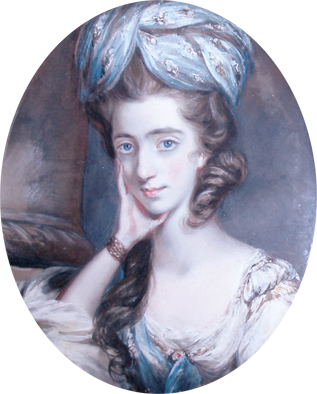
Eleanor Wilson, second daughter of Christopher and Margaret Wilson, portrait by Daniel Gardner, about 1776
