= Kendal Choral Society =

The Kendal Choral Society is one of the three oldest surviving choral societies in England, being founded in 1871, initially to help raise funds for an industrial exhibition. In 1872 it gave its first performance of Handel's Messiah with 50 singers, the performance making a profit of £50 - a considerable sum in those days.

The society has rehearsed and given regular concerts ever since with the exception of a break during the war years.
