= Kendal =

Town in Cumbria, England

Coordinates: 54.326°N 2.745°W

Kendal: Auld Grey Town
- Town
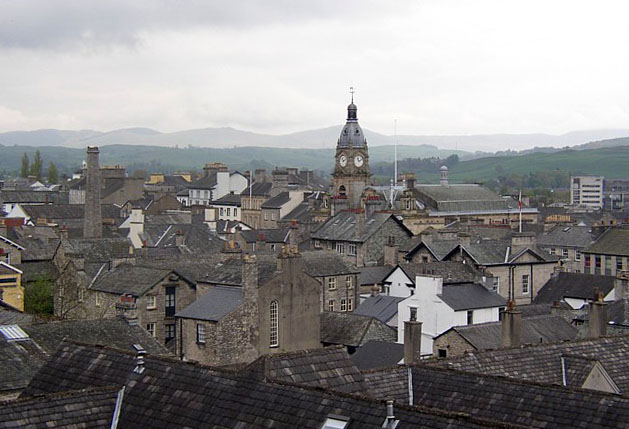
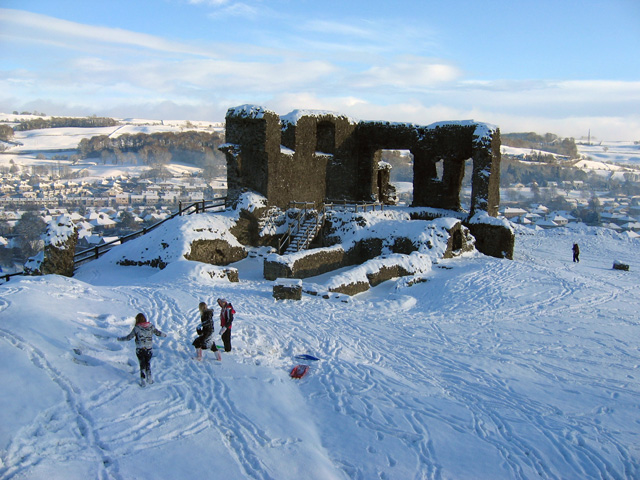
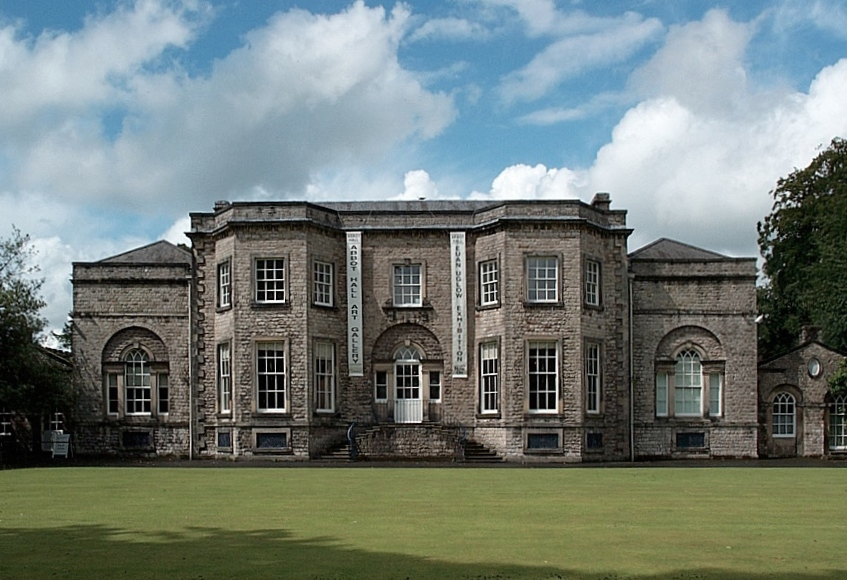
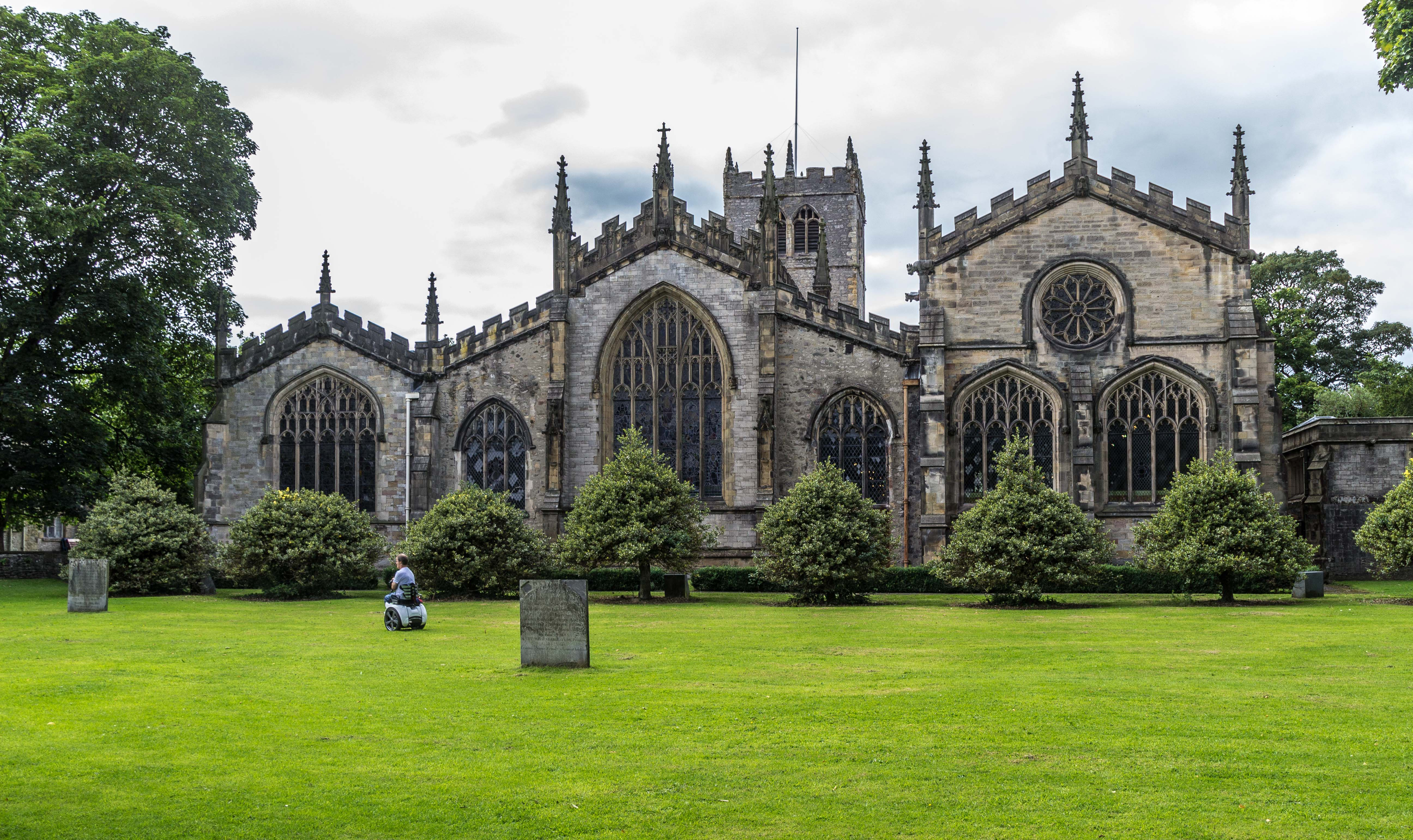
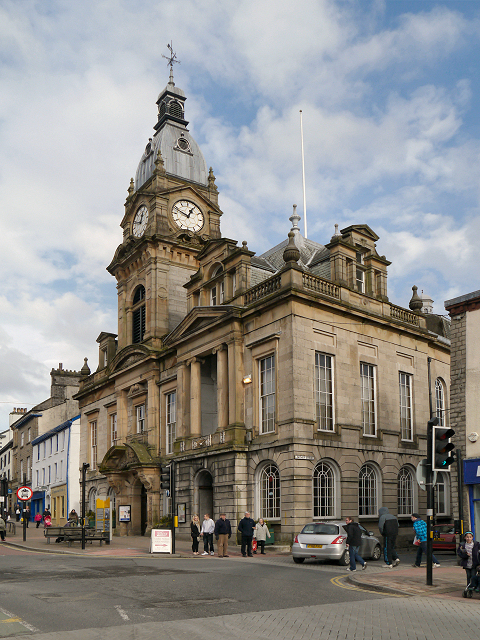
- View over Kendal Kendal Castle Abbot Hall Holy Trinity Church Town Hall

- Location in the former South Lakeland district Location within Cumbria
- Population: 29,593 (2021 census)
- OS grid reference: SD5192
  - London: 223 miles (358.9 km) SSE
- Civil parish: Kendal
- Unitary authority: Westmorland and Furness
- Ceremonial county: Cumbria
- Region: North West
- Country: England
- Sovereign state: United Kingdom
- Post town: KENDAL
- Postcode district: LA9
- Dialling code: 01539
- Police: Cumbria
- Fire: Cumbria
- Ambulance: North West
- UK Parliament: Westmorland and Lonsdale

Kendal, once Kirkby in Kendal or Kirkby Kendal, is a market town and civil parish in the Westmorland and Furness area of Cumbria, England, just outside the Lake District. It lies within the River Kent's dale, from which its name is derived.

In the Domesday Book of 1086, the area was collected under Yorkshire. The area came under the Honour of Lancaster before the barony split. The town became the Barony of Kendal's seat, in 1226/7 this barony merged with the Barony of Westmorland to form the historic county of Westmorland with Appleby as the historic county town. In 1889, Kendal became the county town. Under the 1974 reforms, it became the administrative centre of the South Lakeland district. The town became Westmorland and Furness district's administrative centre in a 2023 reform.

It is 8 miles (13 km) south-east of Windermere and 19 miles (31 km) north of Lancaster. At the 2011 census, the town had a population of 28,586, making it the second largest town in Westmorland and Furness after Barrow-in-Furness. As of the 2021 Census, its population was 29,593. It is renowned today mainly as a centre for shopping, for its festivals and historic sights, including Kendal Castle, and as the home of Kendal Mint Cake. The town's grey limestone buildings have earned it the sobriquet "Auld Grey Town".

== Toponymy ==
Kendal takes its name from the River Kent (the toponymy of whose name is uncertain but thought to be Celtic) and the Old Norse word dalr ("valley"). Kendal is listed in the Domesday Book as part of Yorkshire with the name Cherchebi (from Old Norse kirkju-bý, "church-village"). For many centuries it was called Kirkby Kendal: "village with a church in the valley of the River Kent".

== History ==
A chartered market town, the centre of Kendal has formed round a high street with alleyways, known locally as yards, off to either side. The main industry in those times was the manufacture of woollen goods, whose importance is reflected in the town's coat of arms and in its Latin motto Pannus mihi panis (Cloth is my bread.) "Kendal Green" was a hard-wearing, wool-based fabric specific to the local manufacturing process. It was supposedly sported by the Kendalian archers instrumental in the English victory over the French at the Battle of Agincourt. Kendal Green was also worn by slaves in the Americas and appears in songs and literature from that time. Shakespeare notes it as the colour of clothing worn by foresters (Henry IV, Part 1).

Kendal Castle has a long history as a stronghold, built on the site of several successive castles. The earliest was a Norman motte and bailey (located on the west side of the town), when the settlement went under the name of Kirkbie Strickland. The most recent is from the late 12th century, as the castle of the Barony of Kendal, the part of Westmorland ruled from here. The castle is best known as the home of the Parr family, as heirs of these barons. They inherited it through marriage in the reign of Edward III of England. Rumours still circulate that King Henry VIII's sixth wife Catherine Parr was born at Kendal Castle, but the evidence available leaves this unlikely: by her time the castle was beyond repair and her father was already based in Blackfriars, London, at the court of King Henry VIII.

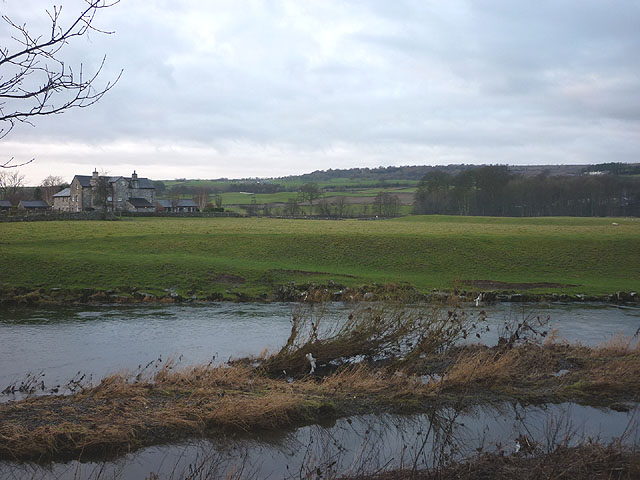
The site of the Roman fort at Watercrook across the River Kent

=== Roman fort ===
A Roman fort stood about 2 miles south of today's town centre, at a site later known as Watercrook. It was built about AD 90, originally in timber, rebuilt with stone about 130, in the reign of Hadrian. The fort was abandoned for about 20 years during the Antonine re-occupation of Scotland. It was rebuilt in the reign of Marcus Aurelius and occupied until about 270 – probably the last time it served military purposes. What remains of the stone structure is now buried under a field. Many Roman artefacts from the site may be found in the Kendal Museum.

=== Transport ===
Early travellers to Kendal complained of eight miles of "nothing but a confused mixture of Rockes and Boggs." Riding horseback was the fastest form of travel, as the road was "no better than the roughest fell tracks on high ground and spongy, miry tracks in the vales."

It became clear it was unjust and beyond the power of a thinly scattered rural population to maintain a road used for through traffic. "Whereas the road is very ruinous, and some parts thereof almost impassable and could not, by the ordinary course appointed by the Laws then in being for repairing the highways, be amended and kept in good repair, unless some further provision was made." In 1703, by Order of the Quarter Sessions of the Barony of Kendall, the surveyors of highways were to make the roads good and sufficient for the passage of coaches, carts and carriages. In 1753 the Keighley and Kendal Turnpike brought a stage coach service from Yorkshire as far as Kendal.

=== Mint cake ===
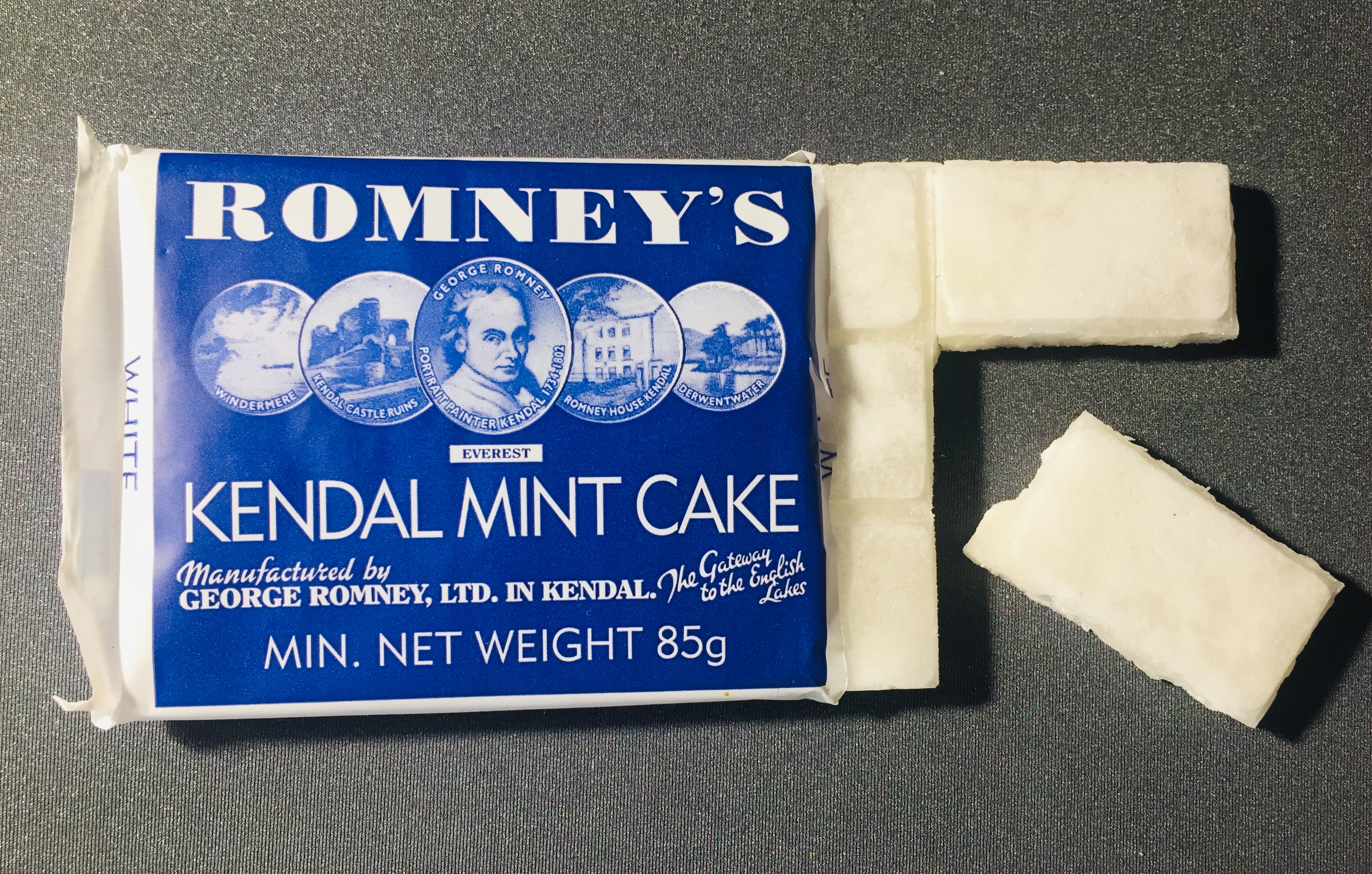
Kendal mint cake

Kendal is known for Kendal mint cake, a glucose-based confectionery reputedly discovered accidentally by Joseph Wiper during a search for a clear glacier mint.

Used on numerous expeditions to mountaintops (including Mount Everest and K2) and both poles of the Earth, its popularity is mainly due to the very astute decision of the original manufacturer's great-nephew to market it as an energy food and supply it to Ernest Shackleton's 1914–1917 Trans-Antarctic Expedition.

By the time the business was sold to a competitor, Romney's, in 1987, there were several rival mint-cake producers; some of these businesses are still in business.

=== Tobacco and snuff ===
Snuff manufacture in Kendal dates from 1792, when Kendal resident Thomas Harrison returned from learning its production in Glasgow, Scotland. He brought with him 50 tons of second-hand equipment, all carried on horseback. Pipe tobacco and other tobacco products were added later to the firm's production. Ownership of the firm passed to a son-in-law, Samuel Gawith, whose eponymic firm Samuel Gawith & Co. remains in business. After Gawith's death in 1865, the firm passed to his two eldest sons, being administered initially by trustees, including Henry Hoggarth, and John Thomas Illingworth.

Illingworth left the firm in 1867 to start his own firm, which remained in business until the 1980s. The youngest son of Samuel Gawith subsequently teamed with Henry Hoggarth to form Gawith Hoggarth TT, Ltd. Both firms continue in business in Kendal, producing snuffs and tobacco products used around the world. Samuel Gawith and Company holds the distinction of employing the oldest piece of industrial equipment still in use in the world: a device manufactured in the 1750s.

=== The Kendal Bank ===
The Maude, Wilson & Crewdsons Bank was established in "Farrers House", Stramongate in 1788. Joseph Maude, Christopher Wilson and Thomas Crewdson were the original partners. In 1792 they moved into specially constructed premises at No 69, Highgate. The Wilson family, who lived at Abbot Hall, withdrew in 1826 at a time of the paper panic of 1825 caused by a run on the banks. Under the style of W D Crewdson & Sons, the remaining family continued until the amalgamation in 1840 with John Wakefield & Sons founded by John Wakefield. The bank was eventually bought out by Barclays.

== Governance ==
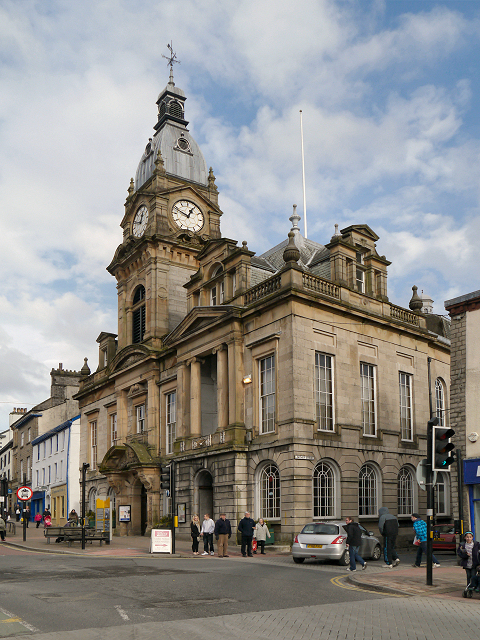
Kendal Town Hall. First stage completed in 1827, clock tower later in the 19th century

=== Civic history ===
The municipal borough of Kendal was created in 1835; until 1894 it was also an urban sanitary district. The borough boundaries were altered in 1935 under a County Review Order to include a patch of South Westmorland Rural District. The civil parishes of Kirkland and Nether Graveship became in 1908 part of Kendal Civil Parish, whose boundaries thereafter were the same as the borough's. From 1888 to 1974, Kendal was the centre of the administrative county of Westmorland, although Appleby was the traditional county town.

The borough was abolished in 1974 under the Local Government Act 1972, becoming part of the South Lakeland district of Cumbria. Kendal as a successor parish kept its own town council.

In April 2023, Kendal became the seat of the new Westmorland and Furness council area. The councils of Cumbria and South Lakeland were abolished at the same time.

=== Parliament ===
Kendal is part of the Westmorland and Lonsdale parliamentary constituency, of which Tim Farron is the current MP, representing the Liberal Democrats.

== Geography ==
Kendal stands on the River Kent, and is mostly ringed by low hills: Scout Scar to the west, Potter Fell to the north, and Benson Knott and Helm Hill to the east. To the south the River Kent winds through rolling dairy- and sheep-farming terrain before reaching the sea at Morecambe Bay around Arnside. Although Kendal is near the Lake District National Park, formed in 1951, it does not lie within the park's boundaries. Kendal's location surrounded by numerous rural villages makes it an important commercial centre for a wide area. It has been dubbed "The Gateway to the Lakes".

=== Climate ===
Kendal has a marine west-coast climate, category Cfb on the Köppen Climate Classification. It has moderately warm summers and mild winters with precipitation at all times of year. In July and August the average daily maximum and minimum are 19 and 11 °C (66 and 52 °F) respectively. The corresponding ones in January and February are 6 and 1 °C (43 and 34 °F).

== Economy ==
Kendal's early prosperity was based largely on cloth manufacture. In the 19th century it became a centre for the manufacture of snuff and shoes – the K Shoes company remained a major employer in the town until its factory closed in 2003. There are still several industries based in the town, such as Gilbert Gilkes & Gordon (manufacturers of pumps and turbines), James Cropper paper makers (based in Burneside, who make, at no profit, the paper for the Remembrance poppies for the Royal British Legion), Mardix (switchgear), Lakeland, and Kendal Nutricare, which has a facility for making baby milk in the north of the town. Tourism is now a major employer, but there is also a significant IT and design sector, enabled by increased broadband availability.

On 26 February 2003, Kendal was granted Fairtrade Town status.

== Transport ==
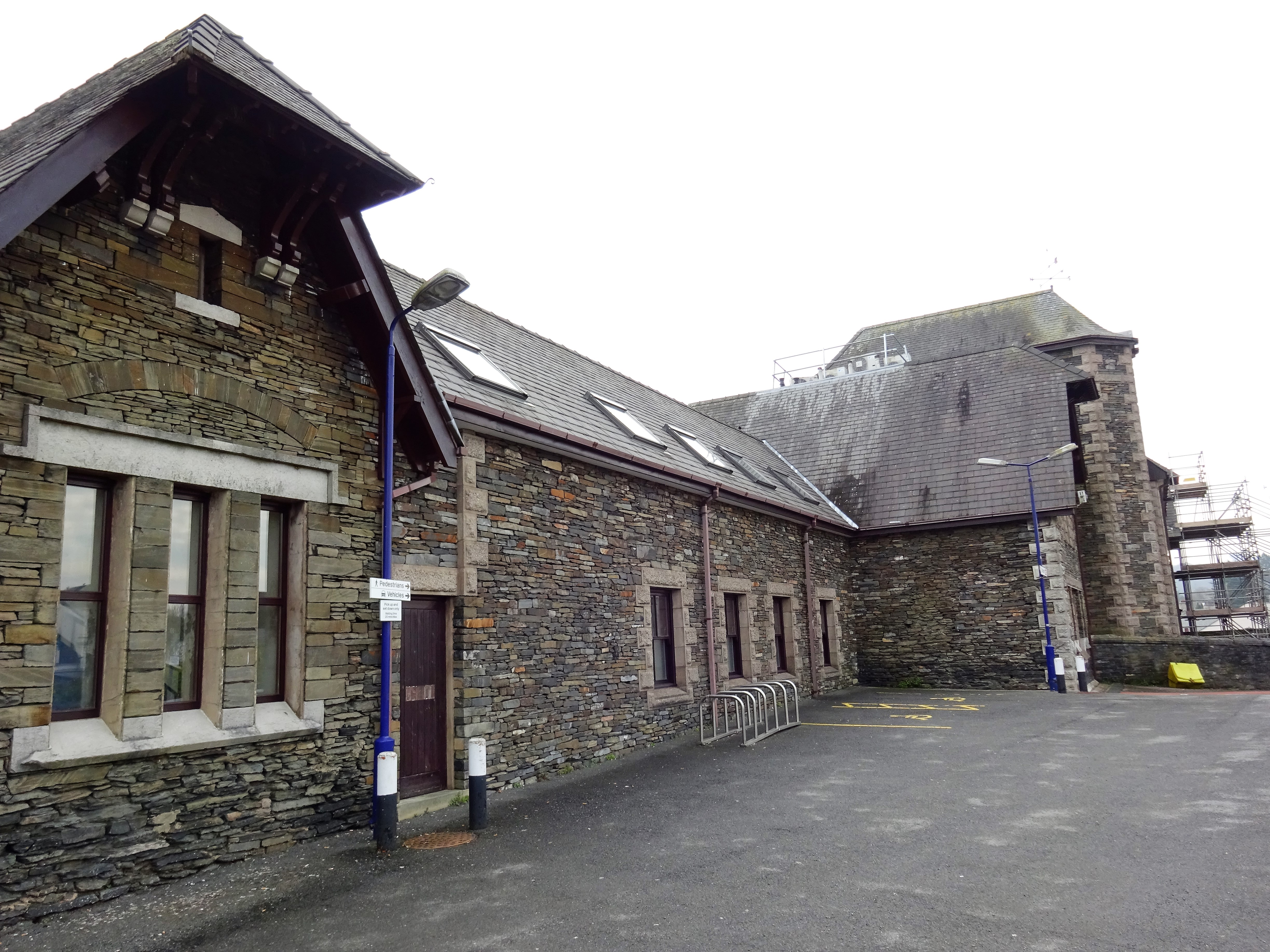
Kendal station's buildings

=== Train ===
Kendal railway station lies on the Windermere Branch Line. Northern Trains provides direct services to Windermere going Northbound and going southbound services to Oxenholme Lake District and some trains continue through to Manchester Airport via Preston.

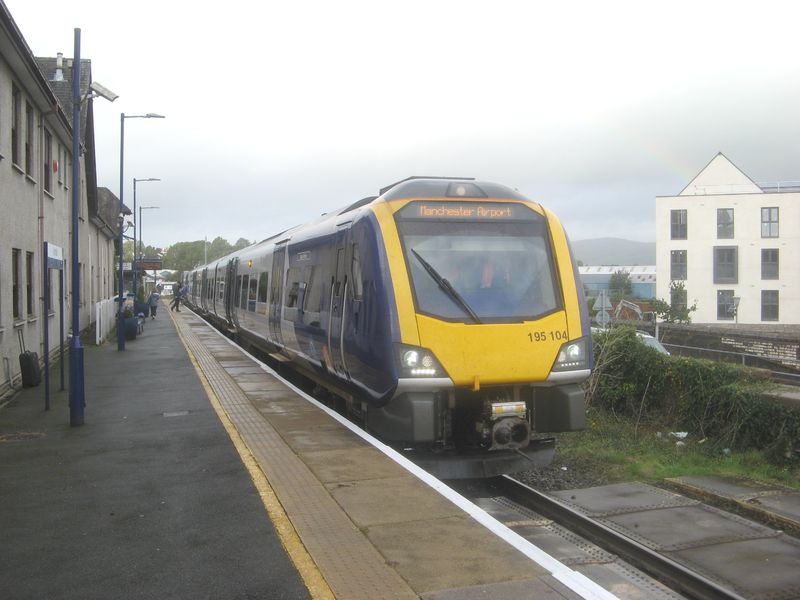
A Northern Class 195 at Kendal Station during September 2023.

=== Bus ===
Local routes from the bus station serve destinations such as Ambleside, Barrow-in-Furness, Keswick, Lancaster and Penrith, with most services operated by Stagecoach Cumbria & North Lancashire.

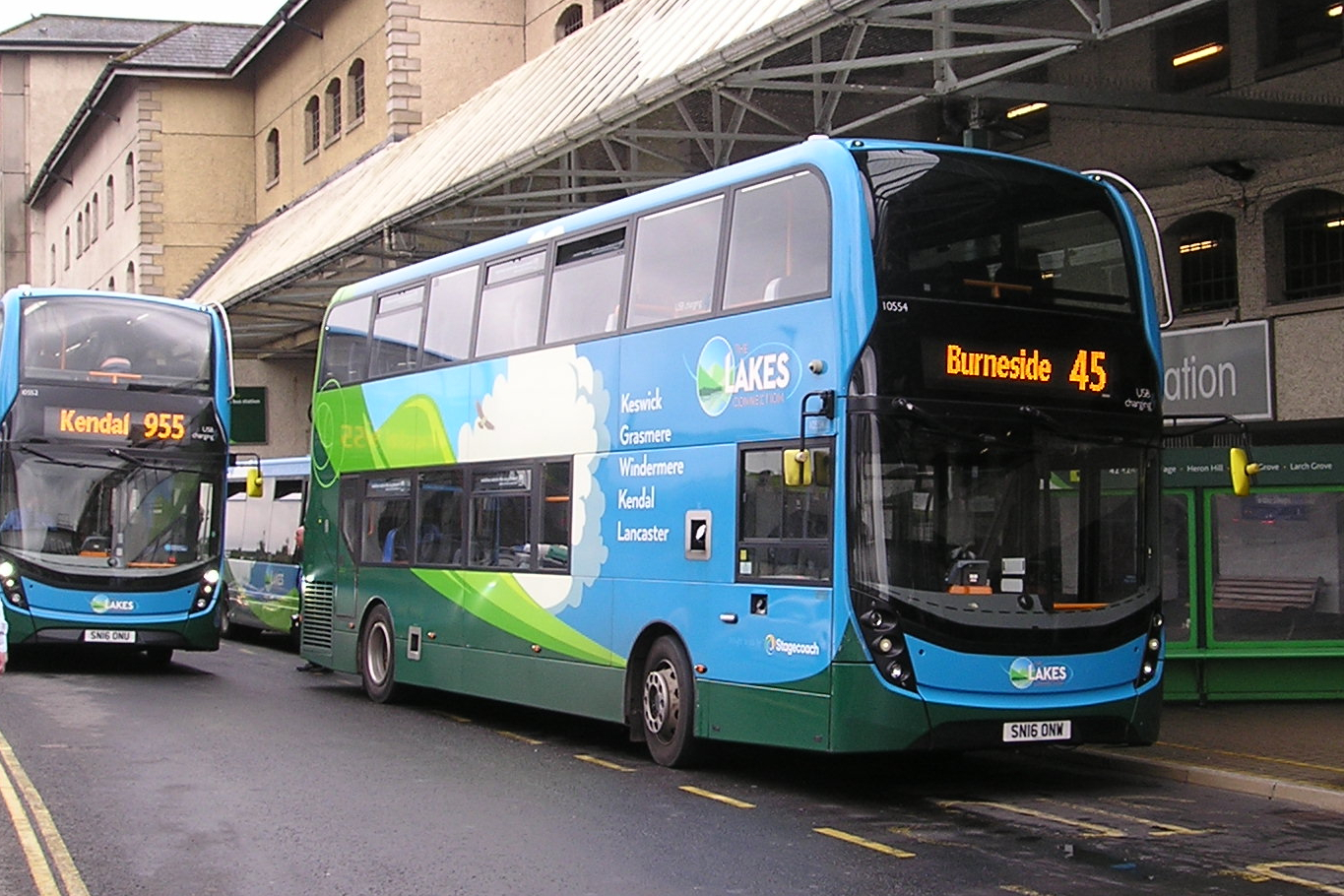
Two Enviro 400MMC at Kendal bus station during June 2022.

The bus routes out of Kendal (non-town routes) are predominately run by Stagecoach however a few are run by a few different operators.

Kendal has a fleet of 'town hopper' buses that run around Kendal and to surrounding villages which are all run by Stagecoach.

=== Roads ===
Kendal is located about 8 miles (13 km) from the M6 motorway. It is bypassed on the west side by the A591 road, linking it to Windermere and Keswick, and by the A590 leading to Barrow. It is also the end point of the A65 road to Kirkby Lonsdale, Skipton and Leeds, and a destination on the A6 road to Penrith. Kendal is signposted off the M6 at junctions 36 (A65, A590), 37 (A684 road), 38 (A685 road) and 39 (A6). A three-mile, £1.9m A591 bypass opened on 29 August 1971.

=== Canal ===
The Lancaster Canal was built as far as Kendal in 1819, but the northern section was rendered unnavigable by the construction of the M6. Part of this section was drained and filled in to prevent leakage; the course of the canal through Kendal has now been built over. The canal towpath, however, remains as a footpath through the town. A campaign is underway to restore the canal as far as Kendal.

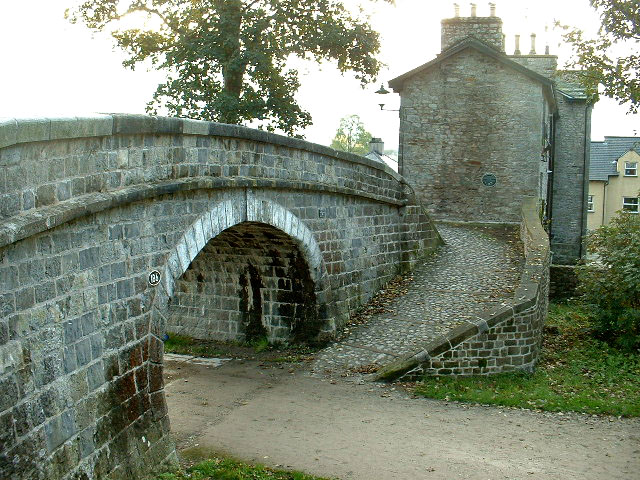
A bridge over the old course of the Lancaster Canal, now used as a footpath

== Education ==
The Queen Katherine School, on Appleby Road, is a secondary school with academy status. The school also has a sixth form.

Kirkbie Kendal School, formed from a merger of Kendal Grammar School & Kendal High School is a secondary school Business and Enterprise College serving the area. It operates as a foundation school with academy status. Its former pupils include the historian David Starkey.

Kendal College provides further and higher education courses and the training for employers.

== Media ==
Local news and television programmes are provided by BBC North West and ITV Border.

Kendal's local radio stations are BBC Radio Cumbria, Smooth Lake District, Heart North West; community on-line stations are Lake District Radio, and Bay Trust Radio.

The town's local newspaper is The Westmorland Gazette.

It has been featured in season 16 (Hide + Seek UK) of Jet Lag: The Game.

== Sport ==
Kendal Town Football Club plays in the North West Counties Premier Division, with home games at Parkside Road Stadium.

Kendal RUFC plays in the 5th tier of the English rugby union system, with home games at Mint Bridge Stadium, which has a capacity of 3,500.

== Places of interest ==
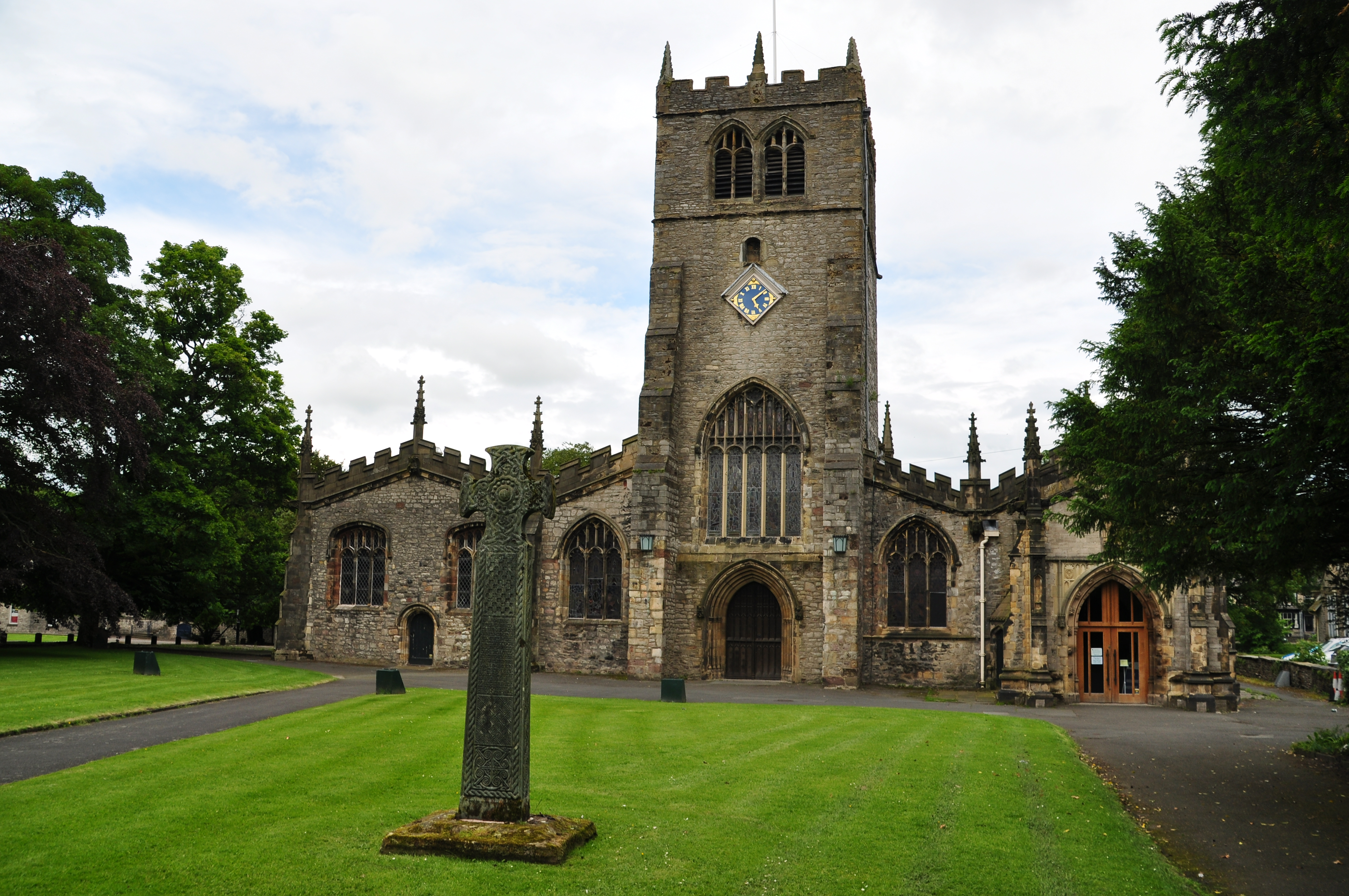
Holy Trinity Church, which includes the Parr Chapel and prayers written by the hand of Queen Catherine Parr

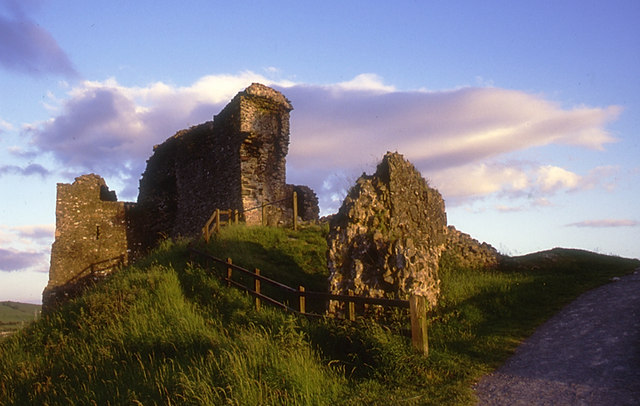
Kendal Castle

- Kendal Museum, one of the oldest in the country, includes exhibits on area history, culture, archaeology, geology, local and world natural history, Roman Britain, and Ancient Egypt.
- Abbot Hall Art Gallery (housed in a Georgian villa) mounts nationally important exhibitions, such as David Bomberg: Spirit in the Mass (17 July – 28 October 2006). The permanent collection covers George Romney, J. M. W. Turner, John Ruskin, Ben Nicholson, Paula Rego, Lucian Freud, Stanley Spencer and Barbara Hepworth.
- The Museum of Lakeland Life in the original stables of Abbot Hall contains exhibits on farming life in the Lake District and a permanent collection of author Arthur Ransome's books and belongings.
- Castle Howe, Kendal's first castle.
- Kendal Castle, to the east of the earthworks, was probably built while Castle Howe was still in use.
- The Friends' Meeting House is home to the Quaker Tapestry.
- The Brewery Arts Centre offers theatre, dance, exhibitions, cinema, music, workshops, youth drama, dance, and food and drink.
- The Queen Katherine Street drill hall was used to mobilize troops in the First World War.
- The Lakes International Comic Art Festival is held in Kendal every year in October.
- Other places of interest are Kendal Leisure Centre, Kendal Parish Church (Holy Trinity), Lakeland Radio Stadium official football ground of Kendal Town F.C., and Netherfield Cricket Club Ground, the home ground of Netherfield Cricket Club and Cumberland County Cricket Club.

== Notable people ==
- Eleanor Acland (1878–1933), Liberal Party politician, suffragist and novelist
- Dave Allen (1955–2025), bass player for post-punk band Gang of Four
- Neil Ashton (born 1969), actor, appeared in Channel 4's It's a Sin and Sky's Brassic
- Desmond Bagley (1923–1983), thriller writer
- Matt Bigland (born 1985), guitarist and lead singer for alternative rock band Dinosaur Pile-Up
- Jonathan Dodgson Carr (died 1884), founder of Carr's bread makers and social reform campaigner
- Ephraim Chambers (c. 1680–1740), encyclopedian
- Isaac Crewdson (1780–1844), Quaker minister born in Kendal
- John Cunliffe (1933–2018), children's author, creator of Postman Pat
- John Dalton (1766–1844), chemist and physicist
- Sir Arthur Eddington (1882–1944), astrophysicist
- Tim Farron (born 1970), current MP for Westmorland and Lonsdale and former leader of the Liberal Democrats
- Sir Myles Fenton (1830–1918), railway knight
- Nicholas Freeston (1907–1978), award-winning Lancashire poet, born in Kendal
- Daniel Gardner (1750–1805), portrait painter
- Steven Hall, Britain's Got Talent finalist 2011 as a comedy dancer
- Paul Hogarth (1917–2001), artist and book illustrator, who collaborated with such authors as Graham Greene and Sir John Betjeman and provided covers for Penguin Books' editions of Shakespeare
- Steve Hogarth (born 1959), vocalist of rock band Marillion
- Geoffrey Kendal (1909–1998), Shakespearean actor and father of Felicity Kendal
- Francis Nigel Lee (1934–2011), theologian
- Isabella Lickbarrow (1784–1847), poet
- Shirley O'Loughlin (living) photographer, member of punk/post-punk band The Raincoats
- Ken Major (1928–2009), architect, author and molinologist, attended Kendal School
- Caroline Moir (living), author
- Eric Pringle (1935–2017), writer for TV and radio, including Doctor Who, lived in the town for 30 years
- George Romney (1734–1802), portrait painter
- David R. Russell (1935–2018), antique woodworking tool collector
- Keith Stainton (1921–2001), politician and Second World War hero in France
- David Starkey (born 1945), constitutional historian
- Alfred Wainwright (1907–1991), guidebook author and walker
- Mary Augusta Wakefield (1853–1910) composer and festival organizer
- Wild Beasts, indie-rock band
- Keith Wilkinson (living), ITV television news reporter
- John Wilson (1741–1793), mathematician and astronomer
- Mark Wilson (born 1989), Newcastle Falcons and England Rugby Union player
- Philip Whitwell Wilson (1875–1956), Liberal politician and journalist

=== Sports ===
- James Ellison (born 1980) and Dean Ellison (born 1977), motorcycle racers
- Maurice Flitcroft (1929–2007) British golfer, immortalised in the 2021 film The Phantom of the Open, was evacuated to the town during the Second World War and was a pupil at Kendal Grammar School
- Peter McDonnell: Footballer
- James Rogers (born 1958) first-class cricketer
- Philip Snow (1907–1985), first-class cricketer
- William Wakefield (1870–1922), cricketer
- Raphael Weatherall (born 2004), first-class cricketer for Northamptonshire
- Jack White (born 1992), first-class cricketer for Northamptonshire
- Benjamin Farrar (born 1983), played Rugby for Sale sharks and London wasps U21

== Literary, artistic and musical references ==
- Lydia Sigourney includes the poem Kendal in her Pleasant Memories of Pleasant Lands of 1842, recollections of her visit to Europe in 1840.
- Poet W. H. Auden says his love is "more wonderful" than "a turbine built by Gilkes & Co. of Kendal" in his prose poem Dichtung und Wahrheit
- Paul McCartney references Kendal in the lyrics of his 1973 Wings song "Helen Wheels", stating: "The Kendal freeway's fast". In his 2023 book The Lyrics: 1956 to the Present, McCartney explains that the song was a description of the journey from his farm in Scotland to London undertaken in his Land Rover which he and wife Linda nicknamed 'Helen Wheels', and referencing key places on the route. He explains: "Kendal is in the Lake District, but the 'Kendal freeway' is meant to be a joke because Kendal is a total bottleneck, as anyone who's tried to drive through it will confirm."

== Local dialect ==
Kendal speech, known as Kendalian, is an example of the Cumbrian dialect spoken in the surrounding area.

== Search and rescue ==
Kendal has long maintained a locally active, voluntary mountain search and rescue team based at Busher Walk. Along with nearby teams, it helped at the Grayrigg derailment in February 2007. Kendal Mountain Rescue Team is one of ten current teams that joined with Lake District Mountain Rescue Search Dogs and Cumbria Ore Mines Rescue Unit to form a Cumbrian umbrella organization, the Lake District Search and Mountain Rescue Association.

== Twin towns ==
Kendal is twinned with:

- Killarney, Ireland
- Rinteln, Germany

== Freedom ==
The following people and military units have received the Freedom of the Town of Kendal:

=== Individuals ===
- Sir Arthur Eddington: 1930

=== Military units ===
- The Border Regiment: 25 October 1947
- The King's Own Royal Border Regiment: 1 October 1959
- The Duke of Lancaster's Regiment: 1 July 2006

== See also ==
- Kendal Choral Society
- Listed buildings in Kendal
- Kendal Mountain Festival
- Kendal Town F.C.
- The Westmorland Gazette
