= Joseph Maude =

English banker (1739–1803)

- Born: 1739; Sunderland, England
- Died: 1803 (aged 63–64)
- Occupation: Banker
- Known for: Co-founder of the bank Maude, Wilson & Crewdson
- Spouse: Sarah Holme (m. 1768)
- Children: 12

Joseph Maude (1739–1803) JP DL was an English banker. He was a merchant from Sunderland, from a family of coal-fitters.

== Early life ==
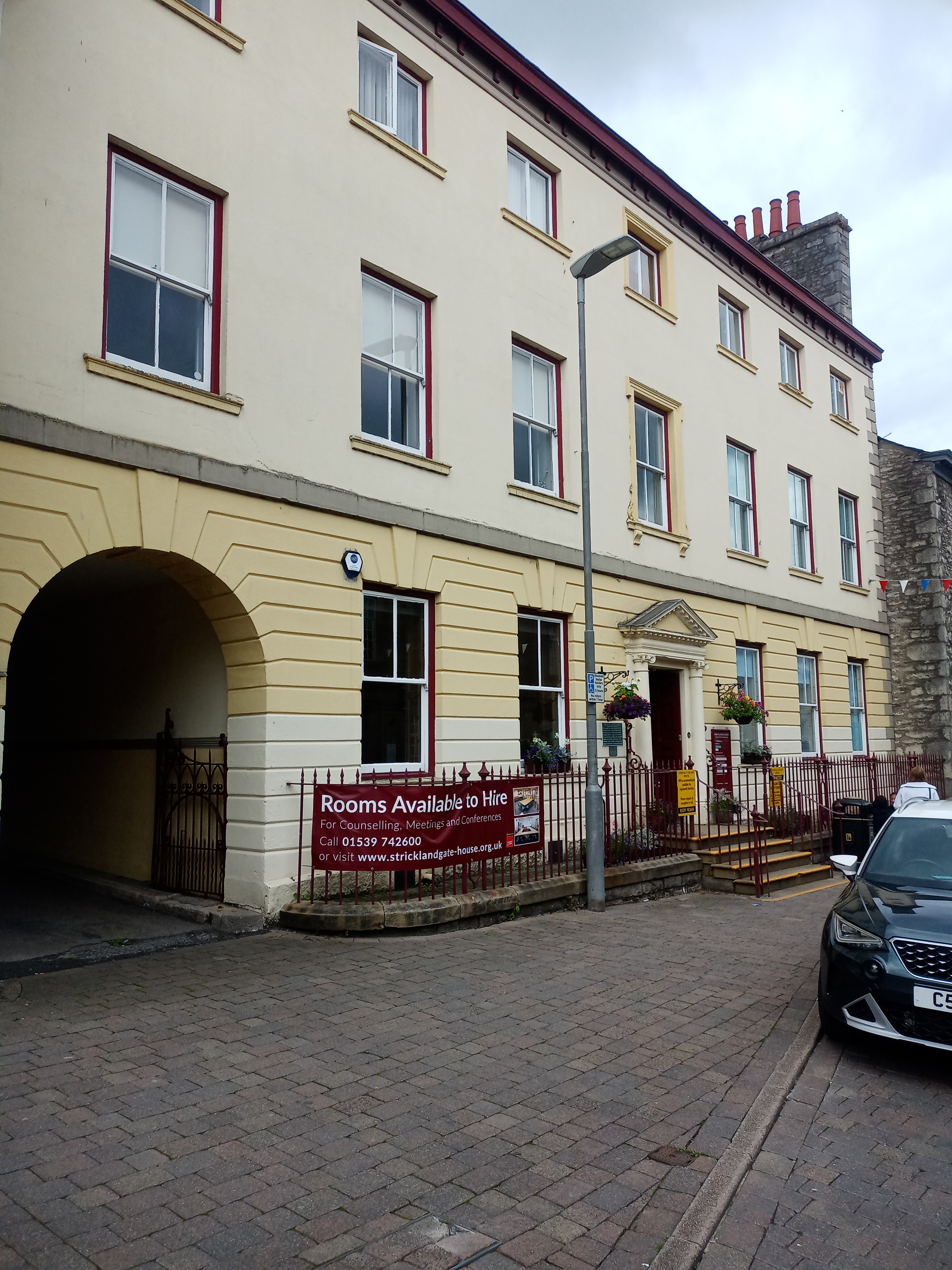
Stricklandgate House, 2023 photograph

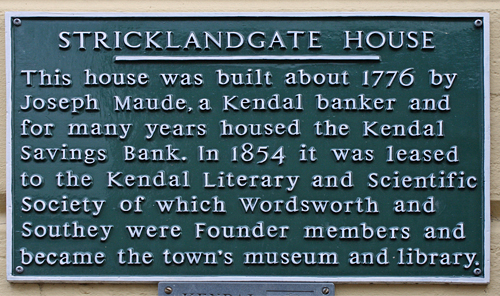
Stricklandgate House plaque

He was the son of William Maude (1699–1753) of Sunderland and his second wife Margaret Holme. His maternal grandfather was Thomas Holme, twice mayor of Kendal in Westmorland, who married Margaret Collinson, sister of Peter Collinson. The Holme family had an iron forge at Levens.

== Career ==
Maude went into the coal-fitting business of his uncle Barnabas Maude (1701–1770), at Sunniside, Sunderland. In 1773, he sold his property in Co. Durham, and moved to Kendal, where he became a landowner. He built Stricklandgate House in Kendal c.1776.

=== Banker ===
Ahead of the formation in 1788 of the bank that traded as Maude, Wilson & Crewdson, Maude was a bill-broker and money-lender. In 1771 he acted as a broker for a bill of John Wakefield I. In 1772 he was asking for repayment of a loan to William Cuthbert of the Tyne Bank in Newcastle upon Tyne. He was involved in a loan to Thomas Fenwick during the early 1770s, at the period when Fenwick was Member of Parliament for Westmorland. Repayment of the loan, when Maude wanted to finance his house, proved problematic.

The other partners in the bank were Christopher Wilson and Thomas Crewdson.

== Personal life and family ==
Maude married in 1768 Sarah Holme, daughter of Thomas Holme of Kendal. The couple had 12 children, nine sons and three daughters. Of the sons:

- Thomas Holme Maude (1770–1849), eldest, graduated B.A. from St John's College, Cambridge in 1792. He married in 1801 Elizabeth Marriott. In the 1820 general election, with Matthew Atkinson of Temple Sowerby, he proposed Henry Cecil Lowther as Member of Parliament for Westmorland.
- Rev. Joseph Maude (1775–1852), 4th son, married in 1804 as her second husband Leah Cooper Viall (1763–1849), previously married in 1796 as his second wife to the Rev. George Bellasis (1730–1802). The surviving child of Emery Viall, she was noted as scholarly and a beauty, and had two children by her first husband, one being Edward Bellasis. The other was Anna Maria, who in 1819 married the surgeon John Masfen.
- Rev. John Barnabas Maude (died 1851), seventh son, graduated B.A. at The Queen's College, Oxford in 1798. After the Peace of Amiens he was detained in France, spending many years at Verdun. His journal has been digitised.

Daughter Charlotte married George Hutchins Bellasis, son of Major General John Bellasis and his wife Anne Martha Hutchins, and nephew of the Rev. George Bellasis. They had six children, four sons and two daughters.
