= George Sowley Holroyd =

English lawyer and judge (1758-1831)

Sir George Sowley Holroyd (31 October 1758 – 21 November 1831) was an English lawyer and justice of the King's Bench.

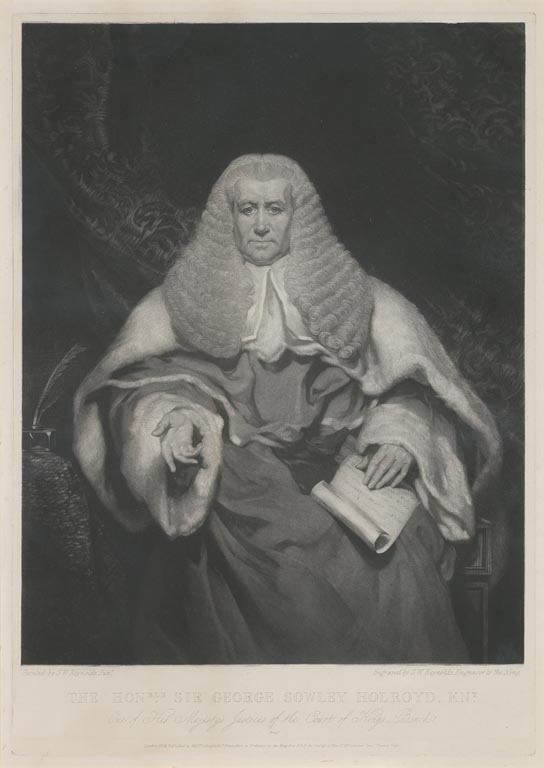
George Sowley Holroyd, 1834 engraving

== Life ==
He was eldest son of George Holroyd, by Eleanor, daughter of Henry Sowley of Appleby, Westmorland, was born at York on 31 October 1758. He was placed at Harrow School in 1770, but his father lost money and he was unable to go to university.

In April 1774 Holroyd was articled to a London attorney named Borthwick, and then entered Gray's Inn in 1777. He read in the chambers of Sir Alan Chambre, and in April 1779 began practice as a special pleader. He at this time associated with Samuel Romilly, Edward Christian, and John Baynes, and with them founded a legal debating society. He was called to the bar 26 June 1787, and joining the northern circuit, obtained a practice both at assizes and at Westminster.

Declining to take silk, Holroyd continued to practise as a junior. In 1811 he distinguished himself in the case of Burdett v. Abbott, in which he appeared for the plaintiff Sir Francis Burdett, against Charles Abbott, Speaker of the House of Commons. In 1815 he was sent as commissioner to Guernsey to inquire into grievances.

On 14 February 1816 Holroyd succeeded Sir Henry Dampier as a judge of the king's bench. On 17 November 1828 poor health compelled him to retire, and he died at his house at Hare Hatch, Berkshire, 21 November 1831. There was a monument to him in Wargrave Church, with an inscription by Lord Brougham.

== Family ==
In 1787 Holroyd married Sarah, daughter of Amos Chaplin of Brydges Street, Covent Garden, London. Of his fourteen children by her, six survived him.

British author Sir Michael Holroyd is Sir George's direct descendant, through his son, George Chaplin Holroyd (1790-1871).

== Notes ==
Attribution

This article incorporates text from a publication now in the public domain: Lee, Sidney, ed. (1891). "Holroyd, George Sowley". Dictionary of National Biography. Vol. 27. London: Smith, Elder & Co.
