= John Wakefield (banker) =

English Quaker merchant and financier

John Wakefield I (1738–1811) was an English Quaker merchant and entrepreneur, financier and banker, based in Kendal, at that time in Westmorland. His business interests grew to include brewing, cotton textile manufacture, and gunpowder.

== Life ==
He was the son of Roger Wakefield III and Mary Wilson. Wakefield began life as a shearman-dyer, apprenticed to his father, in the mid-1750s. His father however died young, in 1756; Mary Wakefield carried on what was a substantial business that included finance as well as dyeing. John was taken into partnership by the end of the decade. His mother's second husband was William Dilworth, a Quaker banker from Lancaster.

Wakefield had an interest in the Gatebeck gunpowder mill, operating from 1764 in an existing family property set on the River Bela. As the result of a tontine he became the sole owner. The company traded as Wakefield, Strickland & Co. In 1790 he obtained a licence for another gunpowder mill, in Sedgwick, Cumbria. In 1806 the Kendal Monthly Meeting of Quakers censured Wakefield because of his continuing involvement in the gunpowder trade.

With a reputation for financial soundness, Wakefield's name was good over a wide area of northern England. He took on investments in a local turnpike, and in shipping from Liverpool. He had five ships active in trade with the West Indies, exporting Kendal cotton and importing sugar. Wakefield had his own cotton mill, at Burneside. He set up a brewery, Wilson & Noble, in Kendal.

On 1 January 1788 Wakefield set up a bank in Kendal. This establishment was simultaneous with the other initial bank in Kendal, set up by Joseph Maude, Thomas Crewdson and Christopher Wilson. The two banks merged in 1840.

== Family ==
Wakefield married Margaret Hodgson of Carlisle. Their son John II (1761–1829) married Mary Beakbane in 1787. In all there were five sons and one daughter.
