= 2003 South Ribble Borough Council election =

UK local government election results

Map of the results of the 2003 South Ribble Borough Council election. Conservatives in blue, Labour in red, Liberal Democrats in yellow and Idle Toad in pinky-red.

Elections to South Ribble Borough Council were held on 1 May 2003. The whole council was up for election with boundary changes since the last election in 1999 increasing the number of seats by one. The council stayed under no overall control. Overall turnout was 31%.

== Election result ==
South Ribble local election result 2003
Party	Seats	Gains	Losses	Net gain/loss	Seats %	Votes %	Votes	+/−
Conservative	19			+1	34.5	43.0	21,301	
Labour	17			-3	30.9	22.5	11,138	
Liberal Democrats	15			+2	27.3	27.0	13,388	
Idle Toad	4			+1	7.3	6.9	3,427	
Independent	0			0	0	0.6	280	

== Ward results ==
Bamber Bridge East (2)
Party	Candidate	Votes	%	±%
Labour	James Owen	357		
Labour	David Watts	311		
Idle Toad	Barbara Nathan	282		
Idle Toad	Stephen Hawkins	278		
Conservative	William Chisholm	203		
Conservative	Margaret Livesey	189		
Turnout		1,620	25.0	

Bamber Bridge North (2)
Party	Candidate	Votes	%	±%
Conservative	Carol Chisholm	422		
Labour	Stephen Bennett	399		
Labour	David Banks	375		
Conservative	Julie Mullineaux	351		
Turnout		1,547	26.0	

Bamber Bridge West (2)
Party	Candidate	Votes	%	±%
Labour	Thomas Hanson	340		
Idle Toad	John Higgins	303		
Labour	Brian Pemberton	278		
Conservative	George Woods	212		
Idle Toad	Renee Blow	200		
Conservative	Collette Nuttall	180		
Turnout		1,513	27.0	

Broad Oak (2)
Party	Candidate	Votes	%	±%
Liberal Democrats	David Howarth	788		
Liberal Democrats	Harold Hancock	776		
Conservative	Linda Woollard	457		
Conservative	Alistair Woollard	411		
Turnout		2,432	35.0	

Charnock (2)
Party	Candidate	Votes	%	±%
Conservative	Dorothy Gardner	377		
Conservative	Melvyn Gardner	366		
Labour	Michael Thistlewaite	317		
Labour	Robert Taylor	295		
Independent	Adrian Underwood	229		
Turnout		1,584	31.0	

Coupe Green & Gregson Lane (2)
Party	Candidate	Votes	%	±%
Idle Toad	Thomas Sharratt	763		
Idle Toad	Warren Bennett	646		
Conservative	Roger Messenger	405		
Conservative	Derek Walmsley	400		
Labour	Rita Harrison	96		
Labour	David Wooldridge	80		
Turnout		2,390	42.0	

Earnshaw Bridge (2)
Party	Candidate	Votes	%	±%
Labour	William Evans	394		
Labour	Peter McClelland	339		
Conservative	Dorothy Eastham	290		
Conservative	James Aspden	270		
Turnout		1,293	26.0	

Farington East (2)
Party	Candidate	Votes	%	±%
Liberal Democrats	Christine Harrison	409		
Liberal Democrats	Nigel Bluck	377		
Conservative	John Otter	188		
Conservative	Dylis Hayton	166		
Labour	Colin Cookson	134		
Labour	Andrew Bennison	132		
Turnout		1,406	30.0	

Farington West (2)
Party	Candidate	Votes	%	±%
Liberal Democrats	Mark Alcock	453		
Liberal Democrats	Judith England	435		
Conservative	Brian Whitlock	378		
Conservative	Philip Smith	373		
Labour	Marian Derbyshire	160		
Labour	Thomas Derbyshire	145		
Turnout		1,944	32.0	

Golden Hill (2)
Party	Candidate	Votes	%	±%
Labour	Matthew Tomlinson	455		
Labour	Georgina Lewis	440		
Liberal Democrats	John Edwin	235		
Conservative	Jean Fell	159		
Conservative	Frank Redfern	135		
Turnout		1,424	28.0	

Howick & Priory (2)
Party	Candidate	Votes	%	±%
Liberal Democrats	David Shaw	626		
Liberal Democrats	Leonard Read	622		
Conservative	Mary Robinson	555		
Conservative	Marjorie Askew	544		
Turnout		2,347	39.0	

Kingsfold (2)
Party	Candidate	Votes	%	±%
Labour	Howard Gore	433		
Labour	James Patten	418		
Conservative	Frank Almond	329		
Conservative	Andrew Gardner	325		
Turnout		1,505	25.0	

Leyland Central (2)
Party	Candidate	Votes	%	±%
Liberal Democrats	Charlotte Ashworth	550		
Liberal Democrats	Dorothy Foster	539		
Labour	Clifford Dawber	379		
Labour	Agnes Gwilliam	309		
Conservative	Malcolm Barker	109		
Conservative	Edith Sayer	83		
Turnout		1,969	36.0	

Leyland St Ambrose (2)
Party	Candidate	Votes	%	±%
Liberal Democrats	Neva Orrell	649		
Liberal Democrats	Derek Forrest	615		
Labour	Brian Walmsley	215		
Labour	Donald Smith	203		
Conservative	Nancy Morris	89		
Conservative	Dorothy Webster	85		
Turnout		1,856	38.0	

Leyland St Mary's (2)
Party	Candidate	Votes	%	±%
Liberal Democrats	Jeffrey Knowles	529		
Conservative	John Demack	483		
Liberal Democrats	Raymond Mellor	456		
Conservative	Michael McNulty	431		
Labour	Michael Titherington	195		
Labour	Simon Butler	176		
Turnout		2,270	40.0	

Little Hoole & Much Hoole (2)
Party	Candidate	Votes	%	±%
Conservative	David Suthers	668		
Conservative	Colin Coulton	613		
Liberal Democrats	Marie Garratt	182		
Liberal Democrats	Marion Hancock	176		
Turnout		1,639	29.0	

Longton & Hutton West (3)
Party	Candidate	Votes	%	±%
Conservative	Colin Clark	995		
Conservative	Jonathan Hesketh	960		
Conservative	Peter Stettner	938		
Liberal Democrats	Jane Marchant	390		
Liberal Democrats	Martin Cassell	336		
Liberal Democrats	Geoffrey Garratt	319		
Turnout		3,938	30.0	

Lostock Hall (2)
Party	Candidate	Votes	%	±%
Conservative	Kathleen Beattie	456		
Conservative	Donald Parkinson	442		
Liberal Democrats	Robert Baines	243		
Liberal Democrats	Doreen Baines	233		
Turnout		1,374	24.0	

Lowerhouse (2)
Party	Candidate	Votes	%	±%
Labour	Fred Heyworth	391		
Labour	Joseph Kelly	383		
Liberal Democrats	Christine Leeming	296		
Liberal Democrats	Michele Edwin	285		
Conservative	John Barnes	104		
Conservative	John Clement	79		
Independent	Ronald Taylor	51		
Turnout		1,589	29.0	

Middleforth (2)
Party	Candidate	Votes	%	±%
Labour	David Bretherton	381		
Labour	Gaynor Bretherton	364		
Conservative	Rosemary Holding	280		
Conservative	David Ross	278		
Liberal Democrats	William Bryce	120		
Liberal Democrats	Doris Pimblett	112		
Turnout		1,535	27.0	

Moss Side (2)
Party	Candidate	Votes	%	±%
Labour	Anne Brown	375		
Conservative	Michael Green	340		
Conservative	Rita Hughes	299		
Labour	James Minall	298		
Turnout		1,312	25.0	

New Longton & Hutton East (2)
Party	Candidate	Votes	%	±%
Conservative	James Breakell	734		
Conservative	Margaret Smith	729		
Liberal Democrats	Marilyn Sumner	408		
Liberal Democrats	Nicholas Sumner	372		
Turnout		2,243	34.0	

Samlesbury & Walton (2)
Party	Candidate	Votes	%	±%
Conservative	Peter Mullineaux	517		
Idle Toad	Barrie Yates	512		
Conservative	Frances Walker	475		
Idle Toad	Michael Nathan	443		
Labour	Christine Watts	164		
Labour	David Lyon	157		
Turnout		2,268	36.0	

Seven Stars (2)
Party	Candidate	Votes	%	±%
Labour	Brenda Wilson	348		
Labour	Donald Harrison	337		
Conservative	Alan Ogilvie	277		
Conservative	Doreen Baker	265		
Turnout		1,227	20.0	

Tardy Gate (2)
Party	Candidate	Votes	%	±%
Conservative	Joseph Hughes	589		
Conservative	Kenneth Palmer	542		
Liberal Democrats	Mark Livesey	192		
Liberal Democrats	Peter Stringfellow	143		
Turnout		1,466	30.0	

Walton-Le-Dale (2)
Party	Candidate	Votes	%	±%
Conservative	Graham O'Hare	493		
Conservative	Harold Clarkson	482		
Labour	Graham Davies	291		
Labour	Christopher Watts	277		
Turnout		1,543	27.0	

Whitefield (2)
Party	Candidate	Votes	%	±%
Liberal Democrats	Anthony Pimblett	797		
Liberal Democrats	Timothy Young	725		
Conservative	Vernon Baker	394		
Conservative	Marie Fryer	387		
Turnout		2,303	39.0	
