= 2009 Lancashire County Council election =

2013 UK local government election

← 2005	4 June 2009	2013 →

All 84 seats to Lancashire County Council 43 seats needed for a majority
	First party	Second party	Third party
Party	Conservative	Labour	Liberal Democrats
Seats won	51	16	10
Seat change	▲20	▼28	▲4
- 2009 local election results in Lancashire
Council control before election
Labour Party
Council control after election
Conservative

A whole-council election to Lancashire County Council took place on 4 June 2009 as part of the 2009 United Kingdom local elections. The United Kingdom government department Department for Communities and Local Government consulted on the issue of moving the elections to the same date as the 2009 European Parliament election, which resulted in the council elections being postponed to June to coincide. 84 councillors were elected for 84 divisions by first-past-the-post' for a four-year term of office. Wards were the same as those at the previous election in 2005. Elections are held in all electoral divisions across the present ceremonial county, excepting Blackpool, and Blackburn with Darwen which are unitary authorities in a similar way to Greater Manchester and most of Merseyside.

All locally registered electors (British, Irish, Commonwealth and European Union citizens) who were aged 18 or over on Thursday 4 June 2009 were entitled to vote in the local elections. Those who were temporarily away from their ordinary address (for example, away working, on holiday, in student accommodation or in hospital) were also entitled to vote in the local elections, although those who had moved abroad and registered as overseas electors cannot vote in the local elections. It is possible to register to vote at more than one address (such as a university student who had a term-time address and lives at home during holidays) at the discretion of the local Electoral Register Office, but it remains an offence to vote more than once in the same local government election.

== Results ==
Lancashire County Council Election Result 2009
Party	Seats	Gains	Losses	Net gain/loss	Seats %	Votes %	Votes	+/−
Conservative	51	22	2	+20	60.71	41.65	140,053	+4.32%
Labour	16	2	30	-28	19.05	23.74	79,810	-13.88%
Liberal Democrats	10	7	3	+4	14.55	11.91	48,939	-4.49%
Independent	3	2	-	+2	3.57	3.64	12,228	+2.22%
Green	2	1	-	+1	2.38	3.95	13,295	+2.35%
BNP	1	1	-	+1	1.19	3.50	11,778	+1.65%
Idle Toad	1	-	-	0	1.19	0.59	1,986	+0.27%
UKIP	0	-	-	0	0.00	6.91	23,244	+6.62%
MB Independent	0	-	-	0	0.00	0.63	2,119	+0.63%
Community First	0	-	-	0	0.00	0.21	704	+0.21%
English Democrat	0	-	-	0	0.00	0.20	661	+0.20%
England First	0	-	-	0	0.00	0.18	599	+0.18%
No description	0	-	-	0	0.00	0.17	567	+0.17%
New Party	0	-	-	0	0.00	0.08	278	+0.08%

The overall turnout was 37.99% with a total of 336,261 valid votes cast. A total of 3,311 ballots were rejected.

== Council composition ==
Following the last election in 2005, the composition of the council was:

↓
44	31	6	1	1	1
Labour	Conservative	Lib Dem	G	I	IT

After the election, the composition of the council was:

↓
51	16	10	3	2	1	1
Conservative	Labour	Liberal Democrats	I	G	B	IT

G – Green Party
I – Independent
IT – Idle Toad
B – BNP

== Ward results ==
An asterisk (*) denotes an incumbent seeking re-election.

=== Burnley ===
==== Burnley Central East ====
Burnley Central East
Party	Candidate	Votes	%	±%
Liberal Democrats	Bill Bennett	1,748	39.59	+4.13
Labour	Muhammad Baig	1,676	37.96	−11.28
BNP	Paul McDevitt	547	12.39	
Conservative	Cosima Towneley	444	10.06	−5.24
Majority		72	1.63	−12.15
Turnout		4,415	38.02	−15.56
Liberal Democrats gain from Labour		Swing		

==== Burnley Central West ====
Burnley Central West
Party	Candidate	Votes	%	±%
Liberal Democrats	Charlie Briggs	1,436	39.05	+17.71
Conservative	Brent Whittam	850	23.12	−0.42
Labour	Tony Martin*	715	19.45	−18.10
BNP	David Shapcott	676	18.38	+0.81
Majority		586	15.93	1.92
Turnout		3,677	33.87	−24.86
Liberal Democrats gain from Labour		Swing		

==== Burnley North East ====
Burnley North East
Party	Candidate	Votes	%	±%
Liberal Democrats	Peter McCann	1,490	39.93	+7.34
Labour	Terry Burns*	1,175	31.48	−8.95
BNP	Peter John Rowe	566	15.17	+1.16
Conservative	David Heginbotham	501	13.42	+0.45
Majority		315	8.45	+0.61
Turnout		3,732	37.06	−22.83
Liberal Democrats gain from Labour		Swing		

==== Burnley Rural ====
Burnley Rural
Party	Candidate	Votes	%	±%
Liberal Democrats	Margaret Brindle	1,552	35.89	+11.65
Conservative	Susan Nutter	1,212	28.02	+0.15
BNP	David Thomson	842	19.47	+3.52
Labour	Stephen Large*	719	16.62	−15.32
Majority		340	7.87	+3.80
Turnout		4,325	38.05	−28.12
Liberal Democrats gain from Labour		Swing		

==== Burnley South West ====
Burnley South West
Party	Candidate	Votes	%	±%
Liberal Democrats	Jeff Sumner	1,896	47.06	+16.59
BNP	John Cave	855	21.22	+3.14
Labour	Maureen Martin*	689	17.10	−19.51
Conservative	Ida Carmichael	589	14.62	−0.22
Majority		1,041	25.84	+19.70
Turnout		4,029	34.69	−23.87
Liberal Democrats gain from Labour		Swing		

==== Padiham and Burnley West ====
Padiham and Burnley West
Party	Candidate	Votes	%	±%
BNP	Sharon Wilkinson	1,155	30.70	8.92
Labour	Marcus Johnstone	954	25.36	−12.62
Liberal Democrats	Martyn Hurt	927	24.64	+2.38
Conservative	Alan Marsden	726	19.30	+1.32
Majority		201	5.34	−10.38
Turnout		3,762	35.05	−25.37
BNP gain from Labour		Swing		

=== Chorley ===
==== Chorley East ====
Chorley East
Party	Candidate	Votes	%	±%
Labour	Terry Brown	1,701	48.16	−18.08
Conservative	Lawrence Catterall	1,005	28.45	−5.31
UKIP	Nick Hogan	548	15.52	
New Party	Colin Denby	278	7.87	
Majority		696	19.71	−12.77
Turnout		3,532	36.35	−18.32
Labour hold		Swing		

==== Chorley North ====
Chorley North
Party	Candidate	Votes	%	±%
Conservative	Mark Perks*	2,534	51.74	+8.72
Labour	Mark Jarnell	942	19.23	−16.88
UKIP	Hilda Freeman	749	15.29	
Liberal Democrats	Stephen Fenn	673	13.74	−7.13
Majority		1,592	32.51	+25.60
Turnout		4,898	40.16	−25.61
Conservative hold		Swing		

==== Chorley Rural East ====
Chorley Rural East
Party	Candidate	Votes	%	±%
Conservative	Pat Case	2,619	48.97	+2.50
Labour	Christopher France	1,857	34.73	−6.23
UKIP	Denise Hogan	872	16.30	
Majority		762	14.24	+8.73
Turnout		5,348	43.90	−23.67
Conservative hold		Swing		

==== Chorley Rural North ====
Chorley Rural North
Party	Candidate	Votes	%	±%
Conservative	Mike Devaney	1,849	49.57	+8.75
Labour	Dave Rogerson	950	25.47	−10.64
UKIP	Mark Rhodes	931	24.96	
Majority		899	24.10	+19.39
Turnout		3,730	37.11	−20.74
Conservative hold		Swing		

==== Chorley Rural West ====
Chorley Rural West
Party	Candidate	Votes	%	±%
Conservative	Keith Iddon	3,042	63.57	+13.62
Labour	Alan Whittaker*	1,743	36.43	−13.62
Majority		1,299	27.14	+27.04
Turnout		4,785	42.99	−24.99
Conservative gain from Labour		Swing		

==== Chorley South ====
Chorley South
Party	Candidate	Votes	%	±%
Conservative	Samuel Chapman	1,400	38.11	+9.31
Labour	Hasina Khan	1,343	36.55	−16.89
UKIP	David Hamer	931	25.34	
Majority		57	1.56	−23.08
Turnout		3,674	35.46	−20.74
Conservative gain from Labour		Swing		

==== Chorley West ====
Chorley West
Party	Candidate	Votes	%	±%
Conservative	Peter Malpas	2,981	58.76	+25.65
Labour	Edward Forshaw*	2,092	41.24	+0.98
Majority		889	17.52	+10.37
Turnout		5,073	40.75	−22.89
Conservative gain from Labour		Swing		

=== Fylde ===
==== Fylde East ====
Fylde East
Party	Candidate	Votes	%	±%
Independent	Liz Oades*	2,594	57.41	+20.39
Conservative	Simon Renwick	1,607	35.57	+2.68
Labour	Dennis Davenport	317	7.02	−12.33
Majority		987	21.84	+17.71
Turnout		4,518	42.95	−17.72
Independent hold		Swing		

==== Fylde South ====
Fylde South
Party	Candidate	Votes	%	±%
Conservative	Paul Rigby	1,452	41.25	−13.20
Independent	Louis Rigby	909	25.82	
Independent	Kiran Mulholland	665	18.89	
Liberal Democrats	Anne Fielding	266	7.56	−11.63
Labour	Bill Taylor	228	6.48	−19.88
Majority		543	15.43	−12.66
Turnout		3,520	39.66	−20.80
Conservative hold		Swing		

==== Fylde West ====
Fylde West
Party	Candidate	Votes	%	±%
Independent	Paul Hayhurst	1,761	41.37	
Conservative	Janet Wardell	1,738	40.83	−14.14
Liberal Democrats	John Graddon	463	10.87	−9.55
Labour	Anthony Lambert	295	6.93	−17.68
Majority		23	0.54	−29.82
Turnout		4,257	42.63	−20.67
Independent gain from Conservative		Swing		

==== Lytham ====
Lytham
Party	Candidate	Votes	%	±%
Conservative	Tim Ashton	2,092	49.42	−9.89
Independent	Ken Hopwood	1,196	28.26	
Liberal Democrats	Tom Armer	528	12.47	−4.85
Labour	Janet Sherwood	417	9.85	−13.52
Majority		896	21.16	−14.78
Turnout		4,233	41.15	−20.09
Conservative hold		Swing		

==== St Annes North ====
St Annes North
Party	Candidate	Votes	%	±%
Liberal Democrats	Howard Henshaw	2,049	45.93	+11.78
Conservative	Karen Buckley	1,502	33.67	−8.22
UKIP	Bill Whitehead	614	13.76	
Labour	Peter Stephenson	296	6.64	−17.32
Majority		547	12.26	+4.52
Turnout		4,461	42.36	−17.62
Liberal Democrats gain from Conservative		Swing		

==== St Annes South ====
St Annes South
Party	Candidate	Votes	%	±%
Conservative	Fabian Craig-Wilson	1,618	40.63	−2.14
Liberal Democrats	Karen Henshaw	1,353	33.98	−0.49
UKIP	Richard Whitehead	539	13.54	
Labour	Brenda Lambert	297	7.46	−15.30
BNP	Frederick Booth	175	4.39	
Majority		265	6.65	−1.65
Turnout		3,982	37.34	−19.28
Conservative hold		Swing		

=== Hyndburn ===
==== Accrington North ====
Accrington North
Party	Candidate	Votes	%	±%
Independent	Malcolm Pritchard	1,771	50.98	
Labour	Jean Battle*	1,136	32.70	−27.82
No description	Brendan Shiel	567	16.32	
Majority		635	18.28	−2.76
Turnout		3,474	35.80	−25.26
Independent gain from Labour		Swing		

==== Accrington South ====
Accrington South
Party	Candidate	Votes	%	±%
Labour	Graham Jones	1,640	46.49	−12.31
Conservative	Paul Barton	1,161	32.91	−8.29
Independent	Tony Hindley	440	12.47	
Green	Kerry Gormley	287	8.13	
Majority		479	13.58	−4.02
Turnout		3,528	38.17	−20.89
Labour hold		Swing		

==== Accrington West ====
Accrington West
Party	Candidate	Votes	%	±%
Conservative	Mohammed Younis	2,043	50.27	+12.08
Labour	Doreen Pollitt*	2,021	49.73	−12.08
Majority		22	0.54	−23.08
Turnout		4,064	42.58	−9.69
Conservative gain from Labour		Swing		

==== Great Harwood ====
Great Harwood
Party	Candidate	Votes	%	±%
Labour	Ciaran Wells	1,316	39.99	−3.57
Conservative	Peter Clarke	1,096	33.30	−7.24
Independent	David Mason	879	26.71	
Majority		220	6.69	+3.67
Turnout		3,291	41.62	−20.90
Labour hold		Swing		

==== Oswaldtwistle ====
Oswaldtwistle
Party	Candidate	Votes	%	±%
Conservative	Peter Britcliffe	2,189	59.63	+24.07
Labour	Dorothy Westell*	1,482	40.37	−5.87
Majority		707	19.26	+8.58
Turnout		3,671	36.15	−24.56
Conservative gain from Labour		Swing		

==== Rishton and Clayton-le-Moors ====
Rishton and Clayton-le-Moors
Party	Candidate	Votes	%	±%
Labour	Miles Parkinson*	2,016	50.88	+5.14
Conservative	Stan Horne	1,946	49.12	+9.86
Majority		70	1.76	−4.72
Turnout		3,962	38.63	−22.66
Labour hold		Swing		

=== Lancaster ===
==== Heysham ====
Heysham
Party	Candidate	Votes	%	±%
Conservative	Ken Brown	1,592	45.57	+10.09
Labour	Jean Yates*	818	23.42	−15.88
Morecambe Bay Independent	Geoff Knight	797	22.82	
Green	Gisela Renolds	286	8.19	+5.39
Majority		774	22.15	+18.33
Turnout		3,493	32.90	−26.42
Conservative gain from Labour		Swing		

==== Lancaster Central ====
Lancaster Central
Party	Candidate	Votes	%	±%
Green	Christopher Coates*	1,993	40.10	+8.67
Conservative	Tom Currie	1,581	31.81	+6.40
Labour	Richard Newman-Thompson	859	17.28	−12.05
Liberal Democrats	Tom Barney	537	10.81	−3.02
Majority		412	8.29	+6.19
Turnout		4,970	44.44	−19.23
Green hold		Swing		

==== Lancaster East ====
Lancaster East
Party	Candidate	Votes	%	±%
Green	Sam Riches	1,502	44.06	+16.54
Labour	Elizabeth Scott*	999	29.31	−12.29
Conservative	Miles Bennington	535	15.69	+1.19
Liberal Democrats	Michael Nicholson	373	10.94	−5.44
Majority		503	14.75	+0.67
Turnout		3,409	35.04	−21.26
Green gain from Labour		Swing		

==== Lancaster Rural East ====
Lancaster Rural East
Party	Candidate	Votes	%	±%
Conservative	Susie Charles*	2,498	42.91	−1.64
Liberal Democrats	Joyce Pritchard	1,292	22.19	−6.70
UKIP	Fred McGlade	933	16.02	
Labour	Fraser Welsh	557	9.57	−10.38
Green	Daniel Tierney	542	9.31	+2.71
Majority		1,206	20.72	+5.06
Turnout		5,822	43.36	−25.39
Conservative hold		Swing		

==== Lancaster Rural North ====
Lancaster Rural North
Party	Candidate	Votes	%	±%
Conservative	Sarah Fishwick*	2,085	50.79	+14.47
Labour	John Reynolds	716	17.44	−9.99
UKIP	John Whittaker	686	16.71	
Green	Michael Woodbridge	618	15.06	+10.21
Majority		1,369	33.35	+24.46
Turnout		4,105	39.25	−26.62
Conservative hold		Swing		

==== Lancaster South East ====
Lancaster South East
Party	Candidate	Votes	%	±%
Conservative	Joan Jackson	1,081	29.61	+2.22
Labour	Eileen Blamire	925	25.33	−11.90
Green	Jane Fletcher	826	22.62	+14.72
Liberal Democrats	Phil Dunster	603	16.52	−10.87
UKIP	Bill Potts	216	5.92	
Majority		156	4.28	−5.48
Turnout		3,651	35.78	−16.50
Conservative gain from Labour		Swing		

==== Morecambe North ====
Morecambe North
Party	Candidate	Votes	%	±%
Conservative	Tony Jones*	1,972	56.86	+12.01
Labour	Ian Pattison	837	24.14	−6.80
Green	Adrienne Wallman	659	19.00	+13.10
Majority		1,135	32.72	18.81
Turnout		3,468	36.46	−36.73
Conservative hold		Swing		

==== Morecambe South ====
Morecambe South
Party	Candidate	Votes	%	±%
Conservative	Albert Thornton	1,157	31.88	+3.17
Morecambe Bay Independent	David Kerr	861	23.73	
Labour	Martyn Jowett	698	19.23	−19.41
Liberal Democrats	Ian Clift	688	18.96	−10.19
Green	Matthew Wootton	225	6.20	+2.71
Majority		296	8.15	−1.34
Turnout		3,629	34.00	−26.89
Conservative gain from Labour		Swing		

==== Morecambe West ====
Morecambe West
Party	Candidate	Votes	%	±%
Labour	Janice Hanson*	684	25.89	−27.43
UKIP	Nigel Brown	544	20.59	
Conservative	Pat Hibbins	516	19.53	−4.91
Morecambe Bay Independent	Geoff Walker	461	17.45	
Liberal Democrats	Michael Gradwell	263	9.95	−8.10
Green	Simon Lewis	174	6.59	+2.40
Majority		140	5.30	−23.58
Turnout		2,642	24.94	−26.08
Labour hold		Swing		

==== Skerton ====
Skerton
Party	Candidate	Votes	%	±%
Labour	Niki Penney*	786	29.89	−30.04
Conservative	Richard Rollins	706	26.84	+0.77
Green	Ian Chamberlain	503	19.13	+5.13
Independent	Roger Dennison	374	14.22	
Liberal Democrats	Barbara Dearnley	261	9.92	
Majority		80	3.05	−30.81
Turnout		2,630	27.03	−27.13
Labour hold		Swing		

=== Pendle ===
==== Brierfield and Nelson North ====
Brierfield and Nelson North
Party	Candidate	Votes	%	±%
Labour	Mohammed Iqbal	2,253	39.20	+5.70
Liberal Democrats	Shazad Ahmed	1,974	34.34	−11.36
Conservative	Mohammed Abdullah	940	16.35	+2.61
BNP	Lee Karmer	581	10.11	+3.05
Majority		279	4.86	−7.34
Turnout		5,748	54.73	−7.05
Labour gain from Liberal Democrats		Swing		

==== Nelson South ====
Nelson South
Party	Candidate	Votes	%	±%
Labour	George Adam	1,652	36.90	+2.04
Conservative	Shakil Rehman	1,123	25.08	+7.91
Liberal Democrats	Sonia Robinson*	849	18.96	−16.77
BNP	Helen Mulligan	507	11.33	−0.91
UKIP	John Banks	346	7.73	
Majority		529	11.82	+10.95
Turnout		4,477	42.14	−17.77
Labour gain from Liberal Democrats		Swing		

==== Pendle Central ====
Pendle Central
Party	Candidate	Votes	%	±%
Conservative	George Askew	1,275	31.00	+11.93
Liberal Democrats	Dot Lord	1,207	29.34	+0.23
BNP	Brian Parker	978	23.78	+9.95
Labour	David Whalley	653	15.88	−22.11
Majority		68	1.66	−7.22
Turnout		4,113	39.25	−18.54
Conservative gain from Labour		Swing		

==== Pendle East ====
Pendle East
Party	Candidate	Votes	%	±%
Conservative	Mike Calvert*	2,295	50.24	+14.11
Liberal Democrats	Adam Thomas	651	14.25	−17.02
BNP	Veronica Cullen	579	12.68	+2.12
UKIP	Graham Cannon	546	11.95	
Labour	David Foat	497	10.88	−11.16
Majority		1,644	35.99	31.13
Turnout		4,568	41.71	−24.49
Conservative hold		Swing		

==== Pendle West ====
Pendle West
Party	Candidate	Votes	%	±%
Conservative	Shelagh Derwent*	2,821	58.06	+10.85
Labour	Bob Allen	816	16.79	−4.74
Liberal Democrats	James Wood	648	13.34	−9.96
BNP	Ronald Bradbury	574	11.81	+3.85
Majority		2,005	41.27	+17.36
Turnout		4,859	45.20	−24.98
Conservative hold		Swing		

==== West Craven ====
West Craven
Party	Candidate	Votes	%	±%
Conservative	Keith Bailey	2,431	41.83	+10.93
Liberal Democrats	David Whipp*	1,996	34.34	−1.29
BNP	James Jackman	897	15.43	+7.25
Labour	Ian Tweedie	488	8.40	−13.90
Majority		435	7.49	+2.76
Turnout		5,812	44.10	−22.13
Conservative gain from Liberal Democrats		Swing		

=== Preston ===
==== Preston Central North ====
Preston Central North
Party	Candidate	Votes	%	±%
Labour	Frank De Molfetta*	1,547	35.05	+4.19
Independent	Terry Cartwright	1,207	27.34	+12.37
Conservative	Sharon Riley	937	21.23	−2.42
Liberal Democrats	Rebecca Finch	305	6.91	−11.29
UKIP	Liz Mahon	266	6.03	
Green	Jonathan Sear	152	3.44	
Majority		340	7.71	+0.50
Turnout		4,414	41.73	−18.33
Labour hold		Swing		

==== Preston Central South ====
Preston Central South
Party	Candidate	Votes	%	±%
Labour	Carl Crompton	1,136	36.42	−13.30
Liberal Democrats	John Potter	724	23.21	+3.53
Conservative	Collette Nuttall	584	18.73	−2.43
Independent	Vali Patel	432	13.85	
UKIP	Abdullah Turgut	243	7.79	
Majority		412	13.21	−15.35
Turnout		3,119	28.59	−23.42
Labour hold		Swing		

==== Preston City ====
Preston City
Party	Candidate	Votes	%	±%
Labour	Yousuf Motala	1,589	48.02	+1.58
Liberal Democrats	Liam Pennington	666	20.13	+2.41
Conservative	Hussain Mulla	647	19.55	+3.87
Green	Mark Westcombe	407	12.30	
Majority		923	27.89	+1.61
Turnout		3,309	33.11	−21.84
Labour hold		Swing		

==== Preston East ====
Preston East
Party	Candidate	Votes	%	±%
Labour	Kevin Ellard*	1,004	37.45	−20.47
Conservative	Paul Balshaw	707	26.37	+2.20
England First	Mark Cotterill	599	22.34	
Liberal Democrats	Danny Gallagher	371	13.84	+0.08
Majority		297	11.08	−22.67
Turnout		2,681	24.27	−23.59
Labour hold		Swing		

==== Preston North ====
Preston North
Party	Candidate	Votes	%	±%
Conservative	Geoffrey Driver*	2,460	59.26	+11.39
Liberal Democrats	Stephen Wilkinson	1,199	28.89	−4.73
Labour	John Young	492	11.85	−6.66
Majority		1,261	30.37	+16.12
Turnout		4,151	46.56	−21.14
Conservative hold		Swing		

==== Preston North East ====
Preston North East
Party	Candidate	Votes	%	±%
Conservative	Michael Welsh*	1,793	44.76	+4.88
UKIP	Richard Muirhead	774	19.32	
Liberal Democrats	Fiona Wren	766	19.12	−10.29
Labour	Bert Williams	673	16.80	−13.91
Majority		1,019	25.44	+16.27
Turnout		4,006	38.00	−21.51
Conservative hold		Swing		

==== Preston North West ====
Preston North West
Party	Candidate	Votes	%	±%
Liberal Democrats	Mark Jewell	1,380	44.66	+14.53
Labour	Tom Burns*	996	32.23	−12.32
Conservative	Alun Roberts	714	23.11	−0.16
Majority		384	12.43	−1.99
Turnout		3,090	34.90	−22.69
Liberal Democrats gain from Labour		Swing		

==== Preston Rural ====
Preston Rural
Party	Candidate	Votes	%	±%
Conservative	George Wilkins*	2,672	68.69	+5.22
Liberal Democrats	Elizabeth Richardson	540	13.88	−6.32
Green	Louise Ashcroft	428	11.00	
Labour	Jack Davenport	250	6.43	−9.90
Majority		2,132	54.81	+11.54
Turnout		3,890	43.43	−23.28
Conservative hold		Swing		

==== Preston South East ====
Preston South East
Party	Candidate	Votes	%	±%
Labour	Jennifer Mein	1,601	60.97	+8.42
Conservative	Julian Sedgewick	557	21.21	+6.89
Liberal Democrats	Jenny Buxton	468	17.82	+3.16
Majority		1,044	39.76	+5.68
Turnout		2,626	29.55	−20.53
Labour hold		Swing		

==== Preston West ====
Preston West
Party	Candidate	Votes	%	±%
Liberal Democrats	Bill Winlow	1,590	44.00	−1.06
Conservative	Julie Buttle	1,552	42.94	+15.49
Labour	Drew Gale	472	13.06	−14.43
Majority		38	1.06	−16.51
Turnout		3,614	34.97	−21.72
Liberal Democrats hold		Swing		

=== Ribble Valley ===
==== Clitheroe ====
Clitheroe
Party	Candidate	Votes	%	±%
Liberal Democrats	Allan Knox	1,864	45.23	3.50
Conservative	John Hill	1,841	44.67	+8.38
Labour	Tomas Thurogood-Hyde	416	10.10	−11.88
Majority		23	0.56	−4.88
Turnout		4,121	36.03	−25.18
Liberal Democrats hold		Swing		

==== Longridge with Bowland ====
Longridge with Bowland
Party	Candidate	Votes	%	±%
Conservative	David Smith	2,820	69.82	+13.99
Liberal Democrats	Simon Entwistle	806	19.95	−8.46
Labour	Niall Macfarlane	413	10.23	−5.53
Majority		2,014	49.87	+22.45
Turnout		4,039	37.50	−27.71
Conservative hold		Swing		

==== Ribble Valley North East ====
Ribble Valley North East
Party	Candidate	Votes	%	±%
Conservative	Albert Atkinson*	3,273	61.97	+5.42
Liberal Democrats	David Berryman	1,252	23.70	−3.69
UKIP	Bernard Hough	757	14.33	
Majority		2,021	38.27	+9.11
Turnout		5,282	45.06	−26.64
Conservative hold		Swing		

==== Ribble Valley South West ====
Ribble Valley South West
Party	Candidate	Votes	%	±%
Conservative	Chris Holtom*	2,788	63.84	+4.88
Liberal Democrats	John Theakstone	946	21.66	−2.57
UKIP	Rosemary Wickenden	633	14.50	
Majority		1,842	42.18	+7.45
Turnout		4,367	41.91	−27.48
Conservative hold		Swing		

=== Rossendale ===
==== Rossendale East ====
Rossendale East
Party	Candidate	Votes	%	±%
Conservative	Jimmy Eaton*	1,449	37.51	−4.14
Liberal Democrats	Bob Sheffield	863	22.34	+3.19
Labour	Dale Connearn	732	18.95	−20.25
BNP	Kevin Bryan	526	13.62	
Green	Helen Jackson	293	7.58	
Majority		586	15.17	+12.72
Turnout		3,863	33.28	−26.35
Conservative hold		Swing		

==== Rossendale North ====
Rossendale North
Party	Candidate	Votes	%	±%
Conservative	Tony Winder	1,894	45.60	+1.89
Labour	Hazel Harding*	1,343	32.33	−12.04
English Democrat	Tony Justice	482	11.60	
Liberal Democrats	Clifford Adamson	435	10.47	−1.45
Majority		551	13.27	+12.61
Turnout		4,154	40.87	−23.90
Conservative gain from Labour		Swing		

==== Rosendale South ====
Rosendale South
Party	Candidate	Votes	%	±%
Conservative	Darryl Smith	2,368	56.22	+18.92
Labour	Nick Pilling	1,052	24.98	−11.84
Liberal Democrats	Sadaqut Amin	792	18.80	−2.35
Majority		1,316	31.24	+30.76
Turnout		4,212	37.46	−25.53
Conservative hold		Swing		

==== Rosendale West ====
Rosendale West
Party	Candidate	Votes	%	±%
Conservative	Peter Evans	1,288	37.73	−11.72
Labour	Bob Wilkinson*	872	25.54	−25.01
Liberal Democrats	Catherine Pilling	684	20.03	
UKIP	David Duthie	570	16.70	
Majority		416	12.19	+11.09
Turnout		3,414	38.24	−21.33
Conservative gain from Labour		Swing		

==== Whitworth ====
Whitworth
Party	Candidate	Votes	%	±%
Conservative	Peter Steen	941	28.17	−0.46
Labour	Sean Serridge	904	27.06	−7.35
Community First	Alan Neal	704	21.07	
BNP	Michael Crossley	543	16.25	
Liberal Democrats	Hetty Crawshaw	249	7.45	−6.32
Majority		37	1.11	−4.67
Turnout		3,341	34.60	−22.68
Conservative gain from Labour		Swing		

=== South Ribble ===
==== Bamber Bridge and Walton-le-Dale ====
Bamber Bridge and Walton-le-Dale
Party	Candidate	Votes	%	±%
Conservative	Peter Mullineaux	1,455	47.10	+15.83
Labour	David Watts	909	29.43	−12.76
Liberal Democrats	Martin Cassell	725	23.47	+10.40
Majority		546	17.67	+6.75
Turnout		3,089	31.71	−26.66
Conservative gain from Labour		Swing		

==== Farington ====
Farington
Party	Candidate	Votes	%	±%
Conservative	Mike Otter	1,482	50.65	+19.79
Labour	Fred Heyworth*	724	24.74	−16.29
Liberal Democrats	Peter Stringfellow	720	24.61	−3.50
Majority		758	25.91	+15.74
Turnout		2,926	34.36	−25.74
Conservative gain from Labour		Swing		

==== Leyland Central ====
Leyland Central
Party	Candidate	Votes	%	±%
Conservative	Mike France	1,942	42.32	+19.80
Labour	Matthew Tomlinson*	1,531	33.36	−14.46
Liberal Democrats	Derek Forrest	1,116	24.32	−5.34
Majority		411	8.96	−9.20
Turnout		4,589	37.10	−25.69
Conservative gain from Labour		Swing		

==== Leyland South West ====
Leyland South West
Party	Candidate	Votes	%	±%
Conservative	Michael Green	2,038	51.83	+22.02
Labour	Anne Brown*	1,228	31.23	−20.12
Liberal Democrats	Gareth Armstrong	666	16.94	−1.90
Majority		810	20.60	−0.94
Turnout		3,932	34.59	−22.83
Conservative gain from Labour		Swing		

==== Penwortham North ====
Penwortham North
Party	Candidate	Votes	%	±%
Liberal Democrats	Tony Pimblett*	2,124	46.06	+6.98
Conservative	Mary Robinson	2,033	44.09	+10.96
Labour	David Bretherton	454	9.85	−9.76
Majority		91	1.97	−3.98
Turnout		4,611	49.13	−20.87
Liberal Democrats hold		Swing		

==== Penwortham South ====
Penwortham South
Party	Candidate	Votes	%	±%
Conservative	Renee Blow	2,048	52.27	+18.34
Labour	Cheryl Ledward-Lee	976	24.91	−22.53
Liberal Democrats	Geoffrey Garratt	894	22.82	+4.19
Majority		1,072	27.36	+13.85
Turnout		3,918	34.26	−26.04
Conservative gain from Labour		Swing		

==== South Ribble Rural East ====
South Ribble Rural East
Party	Candidate	Votes	%	±%
Idle Toad	Tom Sharratt*	1,986	56.13	+11.84
Conservative	Barrie Yates	1,552	43.87	+16.23
Majority		434	12.26	−3.96
Turnout		3,538	37.31	−23.21
Idle Toad hold		Swing		

==== South Ribble Rural West ====
South Ribble Rural West
Party	Candidate	Votes	%	±%
Conservative	Keith Young*	2,765	56.94	+3.05
UKIP	Ann Wilkins	708	14.58	
Labour	Diane Maier	581	11.96	−13.95
Liberal Democrats	David Moore	501	10.32	−9.88
Green	Kevin Moore	301	6.20	
Majority		2,057	42.36	+14.38
Turnout		4,856	42.65	−25.88
Conservative hold		Swing		

=== West Lancashire ===
==== Ormskirk West ====
Ormskirk West
Party	Candidate	Votes	%	±%
Conservative	Robert Bailey	1,465	42.45	+0.19
Labour	Steve Hanlon	968	28.05	−15.57
UKIP	Pat Franklin-Braid	427	12.37	
Green	Maurice George	412	11.94	+3.12
English Democrat	Ken Walters	179	5.19	
Majority		497	14.40	+13.04
Turnout		3,451	38.38	−22.20
Conservative gain from Labour		Swing		

==== Skelmersdale Central ====
Skelmersdale Central
Party	Candidate	Votes	%	±%
Labour	Terence Aldridge*	1,465	55.24	−18.58
UKIP	Mike Brennan	768	28.96	
Conservative	Paul Greenall	419	15.80	+4.72
Majority		697	26.28	−32.45
Turnout		2,652	23.45	−19.13
Labour hold		Swing		

==== Skelmersdale East ====
Skelmersdale East
Party	Candidate	Votes	%	±%
Conservative	Carolyn Evans	1,678	41.17	+1.57
Labour	Bob Pendleton*	1,513	37.12	−23.28
UKIP	Margaret Radcliffe	885	21.71	
Majority		165	4.05	−16.75
Turnout		4,076	36.85	−20.14
Conservative gain from Labour		Swing		

==== Skelmersdale West ====
Skelmersdale West
Party	Candidate	Votes	%	±%
Labour	Maggie Skilling	1,369	44.15	−35.99
UKIP	Helen Daniels	893	28.80	
Conservative	Jane Houlgrave	507	16.35	−3.51
Green	Anne Doyle	332	10.70	
Majority		476	15.35	−44.93
Turnout		3,101	26.97	−24.21
Labour hold		Swing		

==== West Lancashire East ====
West Lancashire East
Party	Candidate	Votes	%	±%
Conservative	David Westley	1,984	58.37	+10.47
Labour	Jacqueline Citarella	736	21.65	−9.84
Green	John Watt	679	19.98	
Majority		1,248	36.72	+20.31
Turnout		3,399	36.96	−23.75
Conservative hold		Swing		

==== West Lancashire North ====
West Lancashire North
Party	Candidate	Votes	%	±%
Conservative	Malcolm Barron*	2,514	66.54	+12.41
UKIP	Alan Robinson	732	19.38	
Labour	Alan Bullen	532	14.09	−9.00
Majority		1,782	47.16	+16.11
Turnout		3,778	34.82	−24.97
Conservative hold		Swing		

==== West Lancashire South ====
West Lancashire South
Party	Candidate	Votes	%	±%
Conservative	David O'Toole*	2,339	55.53	−0.69
UKIP	Jim Bevan	995	23.62	
Labour	Paul Cotterill	878	20.85	−12.32
Majority		1,344	31.91	+8.86
Turnout		4,212	37.83	−25.66
Conservative hold		Swing		

==== West Lancashire West ====
West Lancashire West
Party	Candidate	Votes	%	±%
Conservative	William Cropper*	2,226	50.76	−1.05
Labour	Cynthia Dereli	1,012	23.08	−25.11
UKIP	John Roughley	742	16.92	
Green	Martin Lowe	405	9.24	
Majority		1,214	27.68	+24.06
Turnout		4,385	36.34	−23.75
Conservative hold		Swing		

=== Wyre ===
==== Amounderness ====
Amounderness
Party	Candidate	Votes	%	±%
Conservative	John Shedwick*	2,153	59.34	+1.92
Labour	Alan Morgan	669	18.44	−24.14
UKIP	Les Holt	601	16.57	
BNP	Julie Blain	205	5.65	
Majority		1,484	40.90	+26.06
Turnout		3,628	41.15	−23.86
Conservative hold		Swing		

==== Fleetwood East ====
Fleetwood East
Party	Candidate	Votes	%	±%
Labour	Clive Grunshaw*	1,296	36.98	−20.67
Conservative	Rosemary Timmerman	989	28.22	−0.44
UKIP	Vicki Hopwood	562	16.03	
BNP	Ian Starks	380	10.84	
Green	Rachel Normington	278	7.93	
Majority		307	8.76	−20.23
Turnout		3,505	34.44	−16.25
Labour hold		Swing		

==== Fleetwood West ====
Fleetwood West
Party	Candidate	Votes	%	±%
Conservative	Stan Leadbetter	1,356	36.61	+4.53
Labour	Marge Anderton	1,067	28.81	−22.23
UKIP	David Gerrard	632	17.06	+11.22
BNP	Barry Carr	403	10.88	
Green	John Harrison	246	6.64	
Majority		289	7.80	−11.16
Turnout		3,704	39.34	−15.55
Conservative gain from Labour		Swing		

==== Garstang ====
Garstang
Party	Candidate	Votes	%	±%
Conservative	Valerie Wilson*	3,036	58.96	+5.22
UKIP	Joe Relton	971	18.86	
Green	Chris Hart	602	11.69	
Labour	Billy Glasgow	540	10.49	−11.49
Majority		2,065	40.10	+10.64
Turnout		5,149	42.35	−24.97
Conservative hold		Swing		

==== Poulton-le-Fylde ====
Poulton-le-Fylde
Party	Candidate	Votes	%	±%
Conservative	Geoffrey Roper*	2,550	55.03	+1.63
UKIP	David Jay	800	17.26	
Labour	Sean Hazlewood	714	15.41	−16.05
Liberal Democrats	Kevan Benfold	570	12.30	−2.84
Majority		1,750	37.77	+15.83
Turnout		4,634	42.08	−21.91
Conservative hold		Swing		

==== Thornton Cleveleys Central ====
Thornton Cleveleys Central
Party	Candidate	Votes	%	±%
Conservative	Jim Lawrenson	2,111	47.60	+6.96
UKIP	Roy Hopwood	1,051	23.70	+17.82
Labour	Wayne Martin	915	20.63	−14.89
BNP	Neville Brydon	358	8.07	
Majority		1,060	23.90	+18.78
Turnout		4,435	40.01	−19.82
Conservative hold		Swing		

==== Thornton Cleveleys North ====
Thornton Cleveleys North
Party	Candidate	Votes	%	±%
Conservative	Andrea Kay	1,740	41.17	+1.76
Labour	Penny Martin*	1,276	30.20	−20.25
UKIP	Edward Barnes	779	18.43	+8.29
BNP	James Clayton	431	10.20	
Majority		464	10.97	−0.07
Turnout		4,226	42.83	−16.03
Conservative gain from Labour		Swing		

==== Wyreside ====
Wyreside
Party	Candidate	Votes	%	±%
Conservative	Bob Mutch*	3,582	65.86	+1.64
Green	Alan Schofield	1,147	21.09	
Labour	Andy Meredith	710	13.05	−22.73
Majority		2,435	44.77	+16.33
Turnout		5,439	43.38	−20.29
Conservative hold		Swing		
