= 2007 South Ribble Borough Council election =

2007 UK local government election

Map of the results of the 2007 South Ribble Borough Council election. Conservatives in blue, Labour in red, Liberal Democrats in yellow and Idle Toad in pinky-red.

Local elections were held for South Ribble Borough Council on 3 May 2007. Elections are held every four years with all councillors up for election in multi-member electoral wards.

South Ribble Council Elections: Bamber Bridge East (2 members)
Party	Candidate	Votes	%	±%
Labour	James Owen	416		
Labour	David J Watts	395		
Conservative	Jean Fell	360		
Conservative	Frank Redfern	345		
Idle Toad	Janette Swain	330		
Idle Toad	Terry Yates	248		

South Ribble Council Elections: Bamber Bridge North (2 members)
Party	Candidate	Votes	%	±%
Conservative	Andrea Ball	692		
Conservative	Carol Chisholm	649		
Labour	Stephen Bennett	511		
Labour	John R McKay	402		

South Ribble Council Elections: Bamber Bridge West (2 members)
Party	Candidate	Votes	%	±%
Labour	Thomas Hanson	423		
Labour	Paul Foster	380		
Idle Toad	Mick Higgins	324		
Conservative	Rita Hughes	313		
Conservative	Eileen Livesey	276		
Idle Toad	Jim Davies	216		

South Ribble Council Elections: Broad Oak (2 members)
Party	Candidate	Votes	%	±%
Conservative	Linda Woollard	697		
Liberal Democrats	Harold Hancock	693		
Liberal Democrats	David Howarth	690		
Conservative	Margaret Clark	653		

South Ribble Council Elections: Charnock (2 members)
Party	Candidate	Votes	%	±%
Conservative	Dorothy A Gardner	517		
Conservative	Melvyn Gardner	496		
Labour	Terry Carter	304		
Labour	Richard Newman-Thompson	247		
Liberal Democrats	Helen Louise Crewe	134		
Liberal Democrats	Doris Pimblett	109		

South Ribble Council Elections: Coupe Green and Gregson Lane (2 members)
Party	Candidate	Votes	%	±%
Idle Toad	Tom Sharratt	709		
Conservative	Jim Marsh	611		
Idle Toad	Warren Bennett	542		
Conservative	Frances Walker	539		

South Ribble Council Elections: Earnshaw Bridge (2 members)
Party	Candidate	Votes	%	±%
Conservative	Mike France	512		
Conservative	Irvine Edwards	450		
Labour	Bill Evans	421		
Labour	Elaine Stringfellow	394		

South Ribble Council Elections: Farington East (2 members)
Party	Candidate	Votes	%	±%
Conservative	Mike Otter	393		
Conservative	Graham Walton	326		
Liberal Democrats	Christine Harrison	265		
Liberal Democrats	Andrew Fowler	185		
Labour	Jonathan Woodcock	172		
Labour	Chris Watts	141		

South Ribble Council Elections: Farington West (2 members)
Party	Candidate	Votes	%	±%
Conservative	Phil Smith	749		
Conservative	John Rainsbury	741		
Liberal Democrats	Judith England	385		
Liberal Democrats	Geoffery Crewe	316		
Labour	Andrew Bennison	174		
Labour	Stuart Wilkinson	158		

South Ribble Council Elections: Golden Hill (2 members)
Party	Candidate	Votes	%	±%
Labour	Michael Titherington	515		
Labour	Matthew Tomlinson	511		
Conservative	Norman Pearson	308		
Conservative	Doreen Baker	283		
Liberal Democrats	Tracie Ann Booth	174		
Liberal Democrats	Gareth Armstrong	165		

South Ribble Council Elections: Howick and Priory (2 members)
Party	Candidate	Votes	%	±%
Conservative	Mary Robinson	818		
Conservative	Paul James Clegg	799		
Liberal Democrats	Leonard Read	529		
Liberal Democrats	David Shaw	505		

South Ribble Council Elections: Kingsfold (2 members)
Party	Candidate	Votes	%	±%
Conservative	Alan Best	604		
Conservative	Renee Blow	590		
Labour	James Patten	417		
Labour	Keith Walters	363		

South Ribble Council Elections: Leyland Central (2 members)
Party	Candidate	Votes	%	±%
Conservative	Mary Green	379		
Conservative	Ray Woodburn	326		
Labour	Caleb Tomlinson	312		
Labour	Diane Maier	252		
Liberal Democrats	Dorothy Foster	243		
Liberal Democrats	Gwendoline Schofield	230		

South Ribble Council Elections: Leyland St Ambrose (2 members)
Party	Candidate	Votes	%	±%
Conservative	Linda Williams	420		
Conservative	Madge Suthers	369		
Liberal Democrats	Derek Forrest	285		
Liberal Democrats	Christine Leeming	280		
Labour	Simon Butler	267		
Labour	Cheryl Ledward-Lee	261		

South Ribble Council Elections: Leyland St Marys (2 members)
Party	Candidate	Votes	%	±%
Conservative	Michael McNulty	882		
Conservative	John Demack	804		
Labour	Mike Kelly	243		
Labour	Peter Holker	228		
Liberal Democrats	Martin Cassell	160		
Liberal Democrats	Christopher Fitchie	152		

South Ribble Council Elections: Little Hoole and Much Hoole (2 members)
Party	Candidate	Votes	%	±%
Conservative	David Suthers	821		
Conservative	Colin Coulton	775		
Labour	David Lyons	151		
Labour	Don Smith	138		
Liberal Democrats	Julie Drinkall	110		
Liberal Democrats	William G Bryce	90		

South Ribble Council Elections: Longton and Hutton West (3 members)
Party	Candidate	Votes	%	±%
Conservative	Jon Hesketh	1,292		
Conservative	Colin Clark	1,280		
Conservative	Peter Stettner	1,216		
Liberal Democrats	Mary Susan Moore	314		
Liberal Democrats	Jeremy Baker	291		
Liberal Democrats	David Moore	258		
Labour	Agnes Gwilliam	250		

South Ribble Council Elections: Lostock Hall (2 members)
Party	Candidate	Votes	%	±%
Conservative	Kath Beattie	512		
Conservative	Don Parkinson	488		
Labour	Kevin Pownall	330		
Labour	Joe Redmond	318		
Liberal Democrats	Belinda Fowler	113		
Liberal Democrats	Geoffery Garratt	101		

South Ribble Council Elections: Lowerhouse (2 members)
Party	Candidate	Votes	%	±%
Labour	Fred Heyworth	451		
Labour	Tony Kelly	429		
Conservative	Edith Woodburn	346		
Conservative	John Wright	301		
Liberal Democrats	Marion Hancock	89		
Liberal Democrats	Matthew Howarth	79		

South Ribble Council Elections: Middleforth (2 members)
Party	Candidate	Votes	%	±%
Conservative	Jenny Hothersall	566		
Conservative	Jim Hothersall	564		
Labour	David J Bretherton	400		
Labour	Gaynor Bretherton	379		
Liberal Democrats	Andrew N Jones	132		
Liberal Democrats	Anthony T Hartley	126		

South Ribble Council Elections: Moss Side (2 members)
Party	Candidate	Votes	%	±%
Conservative	Michael A Green	780		
Conservative	Frank Duxbury	702		
Labour	Anne Brown	416		
Labour	Michael Godbold	343		

South Ribble Council Elections: New Longton and Hutton East (2 members)
Party	Candidate	Votes	%	±%
Conservative	Jim Breakell	1,091		
Conservative	Margaret Rose Smith	1,054		
Independent	Nick Sumner	203		
Labour	Margaret Kerfoot	192		
Liberal Democrats	Marie Josaphine Garratt	160		
Liberal Democrats	Mary Isobel Young	150		

South Ribble Council Elections: Samlesbury and Walton (2 members)
Party	Candidate	Votes	%	±%
Conservative	Peter Mullineaux	701		
Idle Toad	Barrie Yates	610		
Conservative	Mike Nelson	566		
Idle Toad	Michael Nathan	508		
Labour	Pauline Robinson	118		
Labour	Tracy Gilmour	105		

South Ribble Council Elections: Seven Stars (2 members)
Party	Candidate	Votes	%	±%
Conservative	David Duxbury	536		
Conservative	Alan Oglivie	496		
Labour	Donald Harrison	377		
Labour	Peter Louis McClelland	351		

South Ribble Council Elections: Tardy Gate (2 members)
Party	Candidate	Votes	%	±%
Conservative	Cliff Hughes	746		
Conservative	Ken Palmer	680		
Labour	Cameron Crook	305		

South Ribble Council Elections: Walton-le-Dale (2 members)
Party	Candidate	Votes	%	±%
Conservative	Jim Bristow	682		
Conservative	Graham O'Hare	630		
Liberal Democrats	Jane Helen Marchant	216		
Liberal Democrats	Peter John Stringfellow	174		

South Ribble Council Elections: Whitefield (2 members)
Party	Candidate	Votes	%	±%
Conservative	Stephen Robinson	727		
Conservative	June Buttery	692		
Liberal Democrats	Anthony Pimblett	590		
Liberal Democrats	Timothy Young	535		

== See also ==
- South Ribble
