= 2013 Lancashire County Council election =

United Kingdom local election

Lancashire County Council election, 2013
| ← 2009 | 2 May 2013 | 2017 → |

All 84 seats to Lancashire County Council 43 seats needed for a majority
| | First party | Second party | Third party |
|---|---|---|---|
| Party | Labour | Conservative | Liberal Democrats |
| Last election | | 51 | 10 |
| Seats won | 39 | 35 | 6 |
| Seat change | ▲23 | ▼16 | ▼4 |
- Map showing the results of the 2013 Lancashire County Council election.
Council control before election
Conservative
Council control after election
No overall control

An election to Lancashire County Council took place on 2 May 2013 as part of the United Kingdom local elections, 2013. 84 councillors were elected from single-member electoral divisions by first-past-the-post for a four-year term of office. Electoral divisions were the same as those at the previous election in 2009. Elections were held in all electoral divisions across the present ceremonial county, excepting Blackpool and Blackburn with Darwen which are unitary authorities in a similar way to Greater Manchester and most of Merseyside. The election saw the Conservative Party lose overall control of the council, instead overtaken in number of seats by the Labour Party, without any absolute majority.

All locally registered electors (British, Irish, Commonwealth and European Union citizens) who were aged 18 or over on Thursday 2 May 2013 were entitled to vote in the local elections. Those who were temporarily away from their ordinary address (for example, away working, on holiday, in student accommodation or in hospital) were also entitled to vote in the local elections, although those who had moved abroad and registered as overseas electors cannot vote in the local elections. It is possible to register to vote at more than one address (such as a university student who had a term-time address and lives at home during holidays) at the discretion of the local Electoral Register Office, but it remains an offence to vote more than once in the same local government election.

== Summary ==
| Summary of results | Burnley | Chorley | Fylde | Hyndburn | Lancaster | Pendle | Preston | Ribble Valley | Rossendale | South Ribble | West Lancashire | Wyre | Total |
|---|---|---|---|---|---|---|---|---|---|---|---|---|---|
| Labour | 4 | 4 | 0 | 5 | 5 | 2 | 6 | 0 | 3 | 3 | 5 | 2 | 39 |
| Conservative | 0 | 3 | 4 | 1 | 4 | 2 | 3 | 4 | 2 | 4 | 3 | 5 | 35 |
| Liberal Democrats | 2 | 0 | 0 | 0 | 0 | 2 | 1 | 0 | 0 | 1 | 0 | 0 | 6 |
| Green | 0 | 0 | 0 | 0 | 1 | 0 | 0 | | 0 | 0 | 0 | 0 | 1 |
| Independent | 0 | 0 | 2 | 0 | 0 | 0 | 0 | 0 | 0 | 0 | 0 | 1 | 3 |

== Results ==
=== Burnley ===
| Seat | Result | Majority |
|---|---|---|
| Burnley Central East | Labour GAIN from Liberal Democrat | 1,347 |
| Burnley Central West | Labour GAIN from Liberal Democrat | 7 |
| Burnley North East | Labour GAIN from Liberal Democrat | 1,029 |
| Burnley Rural | Liberal Democrat hold | 206 |
| Burnley South West | Liberal Democrat hold | 136 |
| Padiham and Burnley West | Labour GAIN from British National Party | 954 |

=== Chorley ===
| Seat | Result | Majority |
|---|---|---|
| Chorley East | Labour hold | 1,127 |
| Chorley North | Conservative hold | 184 |
| Chorley Rural East | Labour GAIN from Conservative | 556 |
| Chorley Rural North | Conservative hold | 123 |
| Chorley Rural West | Conservative hold | 438 |
| Chorley South | Labour GAIN from Conservative | 947 |
| Chorley West | Labour GAIN from Conservative | 609 |

=== Fylde ===
| Seat | Result | Majority |
|---|---|---|
| Fylde East | Independent hold | 1,353 |
| Fylde South | Conservative hold | 522 |
| Fylde West | Independent hold | 415 |
| Lytham | Conservative hold | 873 |
| St Annes North | Conservative GAIN from Liberal Democrat | 207 |
| St Annes South | Conservative hold | 541 |

=== Hyndburn ===
| Seat | Result | Majority |
|---|---|---|
| Accrington North | Labour GAIN from Independent | 243 |
| Accrington South | Labour hold | 158 |
| Accrington West | Labour GAIN from Conservative | 919 |
| Great Harwood | Labour hold | 390 |
| Oswaldtwistle | Conservative hold | 441 |
| Rishton and Clayton-le-Moors | Labour hold | 1,108 |

=== Lancaster ===
| Seat | Result | Majority |
|---|---|---|
| Heysham | Conservative hold | 52 |
| Lancaster Central | Green hold | 340 |
| Lancaster East | Labour GAIN from Green | 115 |
| Lancaster Rural East | Conservative hold | 995 |
| Lancaster Rural North | Conservative hold | 527 |
| Lancaster South East | Labour GAIN from Conservative | 247 |
| Morecambe North | Conservative hold | 561 |
| Morecambe South | Labour GAIN from Conservative | 84 |
| Morecambe West | Labour hold | 65 |
| Skerton | Labour hold | 678 |

=== Pendle ===
| Seat | Result | Majority |
|---|---|---|
| Brierfield and Nelson North | Labour hold | 1,560 |
| Nelson South | Labour hold | 1,113 |
| Pendle Central | Liberal Democrat GAIN from Conservative | 191 |
| Pendle East | Conservative hold | 944 |
| Pendle West | Conservative hold | 619 |
| West Craven | Liberal Democrat GAIN from Conservative | 179 |

=== Preston ===
| Seat | Result | Majority |
|---|---|---|
| Preston Central North | Labour hold | 1,795 |
| Preston Central South | Labour hold | 1,187 |
| Preston City | Labour hold | 1,265 |
| Preston East | Labour hold | 947 |
| Preston North | Conservative hold | 957 |
| Preston North East | Conservative hold | 161 |
| Preston North West | Labour GAIN from Liberal Democrat | 449 |
| Preston Rural | Conservative hold | 1,295 |
| Preston South East | Labour hold | 1,346 |
| Preston West | Liberal Democrat hold | 184 |

=== Ribble Valley ===
| Seat | Result | Majority |
|---|---|---|
| Clitheroe | Conservative GAIN from Liberal Democrat | 45 |
| Longridge with Bowland | Conservative hold | 1,306 |
| Ribble Valley North East | Conservative hold | 1,125 |
| Ribble Valley South West | Conservative hold | 1,564 |

=== Rossendale ===
| Seat | Result | Majority |
|---|---|---|
| Rossendale East | Labour GAIN from Conservative | 133 |
| Rossendale North | Labour GAIN from Conservative | 254 |
| Rossendale South | Conservative hold | 162 |
| Rossendale West | Conservative hold | 32 |
| Whitworth | Labour GAIN from Conservative | 407 |

=== South Ribble ===
| Seat | Result | Majority |
|---|---|---|
| Bamber Bridge and Walton-le-Dale | Labour GAIN from Conservative | 31 |
| Farington | Conservative hold | 22 |
| Leyland Central | Labour GAIN from Conservative | 341 |
| Leyland South West | Conservative hold | 212 |
| Penwortham North | Liberal Democrat hold | 459 |
| Penwortham South | Labour GAIN from Conservative | 187 |
| South Ribble Rural East | Conservative GAIN from Idle Toad | 672 |
| South Ribble Rural West | Conservative hold | 957 |

=== West Lancashire ===
| Seat | Result | Majority |
|---|---|---|
| Ormskirk West | Labour GAIN from Conservative | 318 |
| Skelmersdale Central | Labour hold | 1,553 |
| Skelmersdale East | Labour GAIN from Conservative | 648 |
| Skelmersdale West | Labour hold | 1,809 |
| West Lancashire East | Conservative hold | 630 |
| West Lancashire North | Conservative hold | 1,019 |
| West Lancashire South | Conservative hold | 594 |
| West Lancashire West | Labour GAIN from Conservative | 292 |

=== Wyre ===
| Seat | Result | Majority |
|---|---|---|
| Amounderness | Conservative hold | 664 |
| Fleetwood East | Labour hold | 760 |
| Fleetwood West | Labour GAIN from Conservative | 459 |
| Garstang | Independent GAIN from Conservative | 61 |
| Poulton-le-Fylde | Conservative hold | 1,091 |
| Thornton-Cleveleys Central | Conservative hold | 312 |
| Thornton-Cleveleys North | Conservative hold | 310 |
| Wyreside | Conservative hold | 1,869 |

| Preceded by Lancashire County Council election, 2009 | Lancashire County Council elections | Succeeded by Lancashire County Council election, 2017 |
