= 2005 Lancashire County Council election =

2005 UK local government election

- 5 May 2005

All 84 seats to Lancashire County Council 43 seats needed for a majority

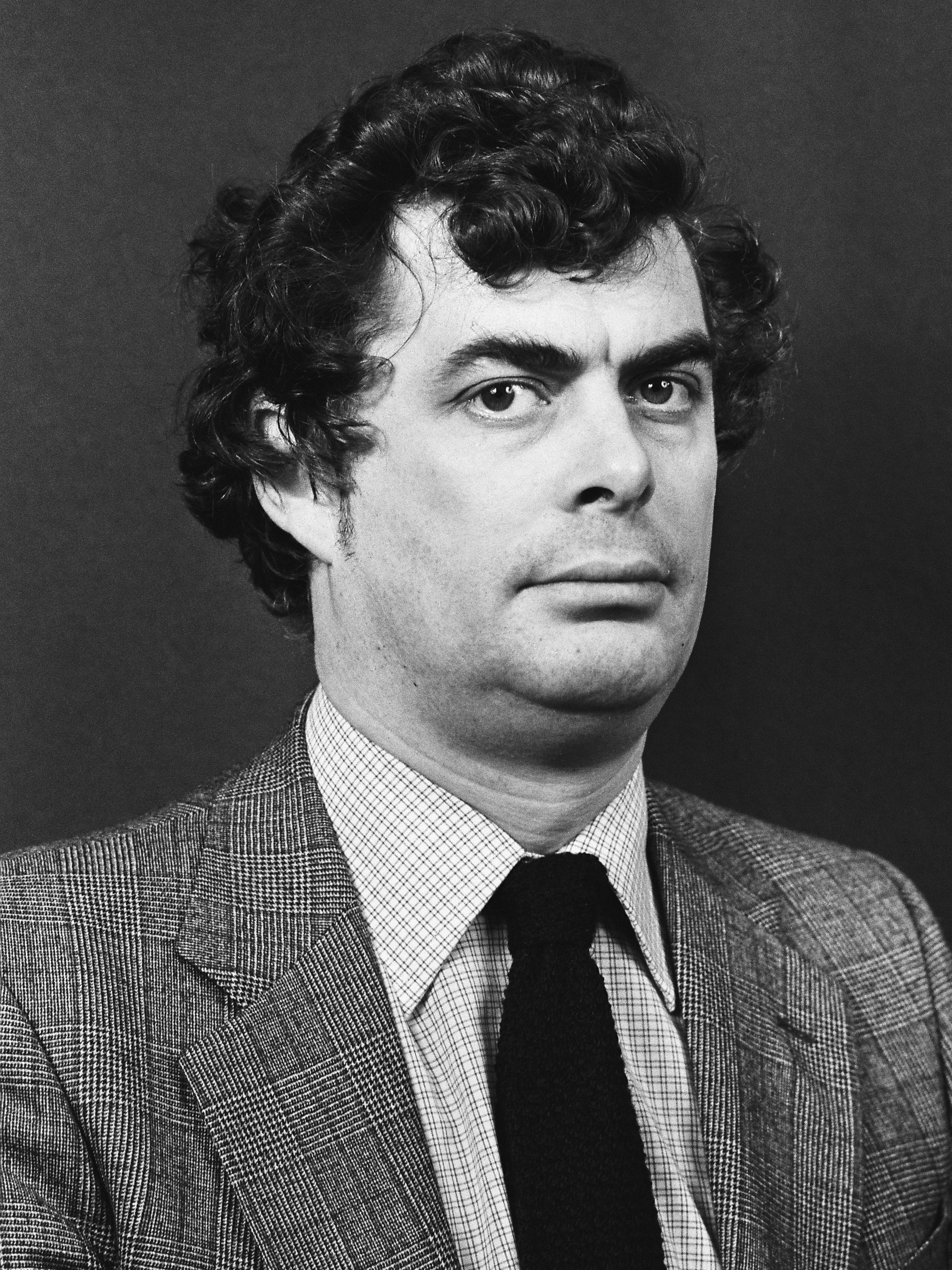

	First party	Second party	Third party
Leader	Hazel Harding	Michael Welsh
Party	Labour	Conservative	Liberal Democrats
Leader's seat	Crawshawbooth	Preston North East
Seats won	44	31	6
Popular vote	197,061	195,517	99,710
Percentage	37.62%	37.33%	19.04%
	Fourth party	Fifth party	Sixth party
Party	Green	Independent	Idle Toad
Seats won	1	1	1
Popular vote	8,350	7,417	1,680
Percentage	1.60%	1.42%	0.32
- 2005 local election results in Lancashire
Council control after election
Labour Party

Elections to Lancashire County Council were held on 5 May 2005, on the same day as the 2005 general election.

Each single-member ward in Lancashire was modified by boundary changes. No elections were held in Blackpool or Blackburn as they are unitary authorities outside of the county boundaries.

== Result ==
Lancashire County Council Election Result 2005
Party	Seats	Gains	Losses	Net gain/loss	Seats %	Votes %	Votes	+/−
Labour	44				52.38	37.62	197,061	
Conservative	31				36.91	37.33	195,517	
Liberal Democrats	6				7.14	19.04	99,710	
Green	1				1.19	1.60	8,350	
Independent	1				1.19	1.42	7,417	
Idle Toad	1				1.19	0.32	1,680	
BNP	0				0.00	1.85	9,702	
Respect	0				0.00	0.53	2,795	
UKIP	0				0.00	0.29	1,531	

The overall turnout was 60.48% with a total of 523,763 valid votes cast. A total of 4,385 ballots were rejected.

== Council composition ==
Following the election, the composition of the council was:

↓
44	31	6	1	1	1
Labour	Conservative	Lib Dem	G	I	IT

G – Green Party
I – Independent
IT – Idle Toad

== Ward results ==
=== Burnley ===
==== Burnley Central East ====
Burnley Central East
Party	Candidate	Votes	%	±%
Labour	John Cavangh	3,012	49.24	
Liberal Democrats	William Bennett	2,169	35.46	
Conservative	David Tierney	936	15.30	
Majority		843	13.78	
Turnout		6,117	53.58	
Labour win (new seat)				

==== Burnley Central West ====
Burnley Central West
Party	Candidate	Votes	%	±%
Labour	Tony Martin	2,356	37.55	
Conservative	Peter Doyle	1,477	23.54	
Liberal Democrats	Denise Embra	1,339	21.34	
BNP	John Cave	1,102	17.57	
Majority		879	14.01	
Turnout		6,274	58.73	
Labour win (new seat)				

==== Burnley North East ====
Burnley North East
Party	Candidate	Votes	%	±%
Labour	Terry Burns	2,418	40.43	
Liberal Democrats	Martin Smith	1,949	32.59	
BNP	David Shapcott	838	14.01	
Conservative	Jeffrey Pickup	776	12.97	
Majority		469	7.84	
Turnout		5,981	59.89	
Labour win (new seat)				

==== Burnley Rural ====
Burnley Rural
Party	Candidate	Votes	%	±%
Labour	Stephen Large	2,410	31.94	
Conservative	David Heginbotham	2,103	27.87	
Liberal Democrats	Peter McCann	1,829	24.24	
BNP	David Thomson	1,204	15.95	
Majority		307	4.07	
Turnout		7,546	66.17	
Labour win (new seat)				

==== Burnley South West ====
Burnley South West
Party	Candidate	Votes	%	±%
Labour	Maureen Martin	2,411	36.61	
Liberal Democrats	Charles Bullas	2,007	30.47	
BNP	Derek Dawson	1,191	18.08	
Conservative	Ida Carmichael	977	14.84	
Majority		404	6.14	
Turnout		6,586	58.56	
Labour win (new seat)				

==== Padiham and Burnley West ====
Padiham and Burnley West
Party	Candidate	Votes	%	±%
Labour	Marcus Johnstone	2,377	37.98	
Liberal Democrats	Mary McCann	1,393	22.26	
BNP	Sharon Wilkinson	1,363	21.78	
Conservative	Laura Dowding	1,125	17.98	
Majority		984	15.72	
Turnout		6,258	60.42	
Labour win (new seat)				

=== Chorley ===
==== Chorley East ====
Chorley East
Party	Candidate	Votes	%	±%
Labour	Don Yates	3,542	66.24	
Conservative	Roger Livesey	1,805	33.76	
Majority		1,737	32.48	
Turnout		5,347	54.67	
Labour win (new seat)				

==== Chorley North ====
Chorley North
Party	Candidate	Votes	%	±%
Conservative	Mark Perks	3,279	43.02	
Labour	Sharon Woodruff-Gray	2,752	36.11	
Liberal Democrats	Glenda Charlesworth	1,591	20.87	
Majority		527	6.91	
Turnout		7,622	65.77	
Conservative win (new seat)				

==== Chorley Rural East ====
Chorley Rural East
Party	Candidate	Votes	%	±%
Conservative	Mary Case	3,826	46.47	
Labour	Thomas Robinson	3,372	40.96	
Green	Matthew Sims	1,035	12.57	
Majority		454	5.51	
Turnout		8,233	67.57	
Conservative win (new seat)				

==== Chorley Rural North ====
Chorley Rural North
Party	Candidate	Votes	%	±%
Conservative	Margaret Livesey	2,442	40.82	
Labour	James Freeman	2,160	36.11	
Liberal Democrats	Stephen Fenn	1,380	23.07	
Majority		282	4.71	
Turnout		5,982	57.85	
Conservative win (new seat)				

==== Chorley Rural West ====
Chorley Rural West
Party	Candidate	Votes	%	±%
Labour	Alan Whittaker	3,840	50.05	
Conservative	Keith Iddon	3,833	49.95	
Majority		7	0.10	
Turnout		7,673	67.98	
Labour win (new seat)				

==== Chorley South ====
Chorley South
Party	Candidate	Votes	%	±%
Labour	Peter Wilson	2,972	53.44	
Conservative	Lawrence Catterall	1,602	28.80	
Liberal Democrats	David Porter	988	17.76	
Majority		1,370	24.64	
Turnout		5,562	56.20	
Labour win (new seat)				

==== Chorley West ====
Chorley West
Party	Candidate	Votes	%	±%
Labour	Edward Forshaw	3,369	40.26	
Conservative	Harold Heaton	2,770	33.11	
Liberal Democrats	Kenneth Ball	2,228	26.63	
Majority		599	7.15	
Turnout		8,367	63.64	
Labour win (new seat)				

=== Fylde ===
==== Fylde East ====
Fylde East
Party	Candidate	Votes	%	±%
Independent	Elizabeth Oades	2,309	37.02	
Conservative	Peter Sowden	2,051	32.89	
Labour	Adrian Hutton	1,207	19.35	
Liberal Democrats	Willian Winlow	670	10.74	
Majority		258	4.13	
Turnout		6,237	60.67	
Independent win (new seat)				

==== Fylde South ====
Fylde South
Party	Candidate	Votes	%	±%
Conservative	Bernard Whittle	2,954	54.45	
Labour	Michelle Miles	1,430	26.36	
Liberal Democrats	Patricia Fielding	1,041	19.19	
Majority		1,524	28.09	
Turnout		6,233	60.46	
Conservative win (new seat)				

==== Fylde West ====
Fylde West
Party	Candidate	Votes	%	±%
Conservative	Joyce Stuart	3,426	54.97	
Labour	Nicholas Wareing	1,534	24.61	
Liberal Democrats	John Graddon	1,273	20.42	
Majority		1,892	30.36	
Turnout		6,233	63.30	
Conservative win (new seat)				

==== Lytham ====
Burnley Central East
Party	Candidate	Votes	%	±%
Conservative	Timothy Ashton	3,647	59.31	
Labour	Marjorie Sherwood	1,437	23.37	
Liberal Democrats	Michael Turner	1,065	17.32	
Majority		2,210	35.94	
Turnout		6,149	61.24	
Conservative win (new seat)				

==== St Annes North ====
St Annes North
Party	Candidate	Votes	%	±%
Conservative	Colin Walton	2,640	41.89	
Liberal Democrats	Howard Henshaw	2,152	34.15	
Labour	William Taylor	1,510	23.96	
Majority		488	7.74	
Turnout		6,302	59.98	
Conservative win (new seat)				

==== St Annes South ====
St Annes South
Party	Candidate	Votes	%	±%
Conservative	Alfred Jealous	2,601	42.77	
Liberal Democrats	Karen Henshaw	2,096	34.47	
Labour	Dennis Davenport	1,384	22.76	
Majority		505	8.30	
Turnout		6,081	56.62	
Conservative win (new seat)				

=== Hyndburn ===
==== Accrington North ====
Accrington North
Party	Candidate	Votes	%	±%
Labour	Jean Battle	3,561	60.52	
Conservative	Janet Storey	2,323	39.48	
Majority		1,238	21.04	
Turnout		5,884	61.06	
Labour win (new seat)				

==== Accrington South ====
Accrington South
Party	Candidate	Votes	%	±%
Labour	Wendy Dwyer	3,288	58.80	
Conservative	Paul Barton	2,394	41.20	
Majority		984	17.60	
Turnout		5,592	59.06	
Labour win (new seat)				

==== Accrington West ====
Accrington West
Party	Candidate	Votes	%	±%
Labour	Doreen Pollitt	3,201	61.81	
Conservative	Mohammed Siddique	1,978	38.19	
Majority		1,223	23.62	
Turnout		5,179	52.27	
Labour win (new seat)				

==== Great Harwood ====
Great Harwood
Party	Candidate	Votes	%	±%
Labour	Susan Shorrock	2,241	43.56	
Conservative	Winifred Frankland	2,086	40.54	
Liberal Democrats	George Slynn	818	15.90	
Majority		155	3.02	
Turnout		5,145	62.52	
Labour win (new seat)				

==== Oswaldtwistle ====
Oswaldtwistle
Party	Candidate	Votes	%	±%
Labour	Dorothy Westell	2,918	46.24	
Conservative	Peter Britcliffe	2,244	35.56	
Liberal Democrats	Clive Fisher	1,149	18.20	
Majority		674	10.68	
Turnout		6,311	60.71	
Labour win (new seat)				

==== Rishton and Clayton-le-Moors ====
Rishton and Clayton-le-Moors
Party	Candidate	Votes	%	±%
Labour	Miles Parkinson	2,958	45.74	
Conservative	Ann Scaife	2,539	39.26	
Liberal Democrats	William Greene	970	15.00	
Majority		419	6.48	
Turnout		6,467	61.29	
Labour win (new seat)				

=== Lancaster ===
==== Heysham ====
Heysham
Party	Candidate	Votes	%	±%
Labour	Jean Yates	2,453	39.30	
Conservative	Kenneth Brown	2,214	35.48	
Liberal Democrats	William Riley	792	12.69	
Independent	Michael Greenall	607	9.73	
Green	Stephen Dickenson	175	2.80	
Majority		239	3.82	
Turnout		6,241	59.32	
Labour win (new seat)				

==== Lancaster Central ====
Lancaster Central
Party	Candidate	Votes	%	±%
Green	Christopher Coates	2,252	31.43	
Labour	Michael Gibson	2,102	29.33	
Conservative	Helen Helme	1,821	25.41	
Liberal Democrats	Catherine Fritz	991	13.83	
Majority		150	2.10	
Turnout		7,166	63.67	
Green win (new seat)				

==== Lancaster East ====
Lancaster East
Party	Candidate	Votes	%	±%
Labour	Elizabeth Scott	2,240	41.60	
Green	Matthew Wottoon	1,482	27.52	
Liberal Democrats	Philip Dunster	882	16.38	
Conservative	Joan Jackson	781	14.50	
Majority		758	14.08	
Turnout		5,385	56.30	
Labour win (new seat)				

==== Lancaster Rural East ====
Lancaster Rural East
Party	Candidate	Votes	%	±%
Conservative	Susan Charles	3,947	44.55	
Liberal Democrats	Joyce Pritchard	2,560	28.89	
Labour	Benjamin Soffa	1,768	19.95	
Green	Abigail Mills	585	6.60	
Majority		1,387	15.66	
Turnout		8,860	68.75	
Conservative win (new seat)				

==== Lancaster Rural North ====
Lancaster Rural North
Party	Candidate	Votes	%	±%
Conservative	Sarah Fishwick	2,518	36.32	
Labour	Janette Gardner	1,902	27.43	
Liberal Democrats	June Greenwell	1,396	20.14	
Independent	Keith Budden	781	11.26	
Green	Ian McCulloch	336	4.85	
Majority		616	8.89	
Turnout		6,933	65.87	
Conservative win (new seat)				

==== Lancaster South East ====
Lancaster South East
Party	Candidate	Votes	%	±%
Labour	Peter Elliott	1,862	37.23	
Conservative	Clare Hilley	1,370	27.39	
Liberal Democrats	Robert Hayes	1,370	27.39	
Green	Susanna Holden	395	7.90	
Majority		448	9.76	
Turnout		5,001	52.28	
Labour win (new seat)				

==== Morecambe North ====
Morecambe North
Party	Candidate	Votes	%	±%
Conservative	Anthony Jones	2,667	44.85	
Labour	Elaine Bush	1,840	30.94	
Liberal Democrats	Ian Clift	1,089	18.31	
Green	Pamela White	351	5.90	
Majority		827	13.91	
Turnout		5,947	73.19	
Conservative win (new seat)				

==== Morecambe South ====
Morecambe South
Party	Candidate	Votes	%	±%
Labour	Albert Thornton	2,554	38.64	
Liberal Democrats	Ronald Day	1,927	29.15	
Conservative	Gordon Hagel	1,898	28.71	
Green	Howard Jago	231	3.49	
Majority		627	9.49	
Turnout		6,610	60.89	
Labour win (new seat)				

==== Morecambe West ====
Morecambe West
Party	Candidate	Votes	%	±%
Labour	Janice Hanson	2,904	53.32	
Conservative	John Mace	1,331	24.44	
Liberal Democrats	Michael Gradwell	983	18.05	
Green	Mark Westcombe	228	4.19	
Majority		1,573	28.88	
Turnout		5,446	51.02	
Labour win (new seat)				

==== Skerton ====
Skerton
Party	Candidate	Votes	%	±%
Labour	Nicola Penney	3,096	59.93	
Conservative	Anthony Johnson	1,347	26.07	
Green	Ashley Toms	723	14.00	
Majority		1,749	33.86	
Turnout		5,166	54.16	
Labour win (new seat)				

=== Pendle ===
==== Brierfield and Nelson North ====
Brierfield and Nelson North
Party	Candidate	Votes	%	±%
Liberal Democrats	Nawaz Ahmed	2,913	45.70	
Labour	Colin Waite	2,135	33.50	
Conservative	Tonia Barton	876	13.74	
BNP	Anthony Locke	450	7.06	
Majority		778	12.20	
Turnout		6,374	61.78	
Liberal Democrats win (new seat)				

==== Nelson South ====
Nelson South
Party	Candidate	Votes	%	±%
Liberal Democrats	Sonia Robinson	2,133	35.73	
Labour	Dorothy Ormrod	2,081	34.86	
Conservative	Ann Jackson	1,025	17.17	
BNP	Trevor Dawson	731	12.24	
Majority		52	0.87	
Turnout		5,970	59.91	
Liberal Democrats win (new seat)				

==== Pendle Central ====
Pendle Central
Party	Candidate	Votes	%	±%
Labour	Leonard Ormrod	2,239	37.99	
Liberal Democrats	Dorothy Lord	1,716	29.11	
Conservative	Michael Landriau	1,124	19.07	
BNP	Brian Parker	815	13.83	
Majority		523	8.88	
Turnout		5,894	57.79	
Labour win (new seat)				

==== Pendle East ====
Pendle East
Party	Candidate	Votes	%	±%
Conservative	Michael Calvert	2,539	36.13	
Liberal Democrats	Alan Davies	2,197	31.27	
Labour	Frank Allanson	1,549	22.04	
BNP	Thomas Boocock	742	10.56	
Majority		342	4.86	
Turnout		7,027	66.20	
Conservative win (new seat)				

==== Pendle West ====
Pendle West
Party	Candidate	Votes	%	±%
Conservative	Shelagh Derwent	3,489	47.21	
Liberal Democrats	Francis Wren	1,722	23.30	
Labour	Sheila Wicks	1,591	21.53	
BNP	Robert Cottage	588	7.96	
Majority		1,767	23.91	
Turnout		7,390	70.18	
Conservative win (new seat)				

==== West Craven ====
West Craven
Party	Candidate	Votes	%	±%
Liberal Democrats	David Whipp	2,954	35.63	
Conservative	Morris Horsfield	2,562	30.90	
Labour	Antony Holian	1,849	22.30	
BNP	Geoffrey Whitehead	678	8.18	
UKIP	Steven Preston	248	2.99	
Majority		392	4.73	
Turnout		8,291	66.23	
Liberal Democrats win (new seat)				

=== Preston ===
==== Preston Central North ====
Preston Central North
Party	Candidate	Votes	%	±%
Labour	Francesco De Molfetta	1,674	30.86	
Conservative	Constance McManus	1,283	23.65	
Liberal Democrats	Samir Bohra	987	18.20	
Independent	Terry Cartwright	812	14.97	
Respect	Valli Umarji	551	10.16	
Independent	John Wilson	117	2.16	
Majority		391	7.21	
Turnout		5,424	60.06	
Labour win (new seat)				

==== Preston Central South ====
Preston Central South
Party	Candidate	Votes	%	±%
Labour	Vali Patel	2,218	49.72	
Conservative	Ronald Smith	944	21.16	
Liberal Democrats	Tracy Singleton	878	19.68	
Respect	Steven Brooks	421	9.44	
Majority		1,274	28.56	
Turnout		4,461	52.01	
Labour win (new seat)				

==== Preston City ====
Preston City
Party	Candidate	Votes	%	±%
Labour	Yakub Patel	2,044	46.44	
Respect	Elaine Abbot	887	20.16	
Liberal Democrats	Wilfred Gavin	780	17.72	
Conservative	Collette Nuttall	690	15.68	
Majority		1,157	26.28	
Turnout		4,401	54.95	
Labour win (new seat)				

==== Preston East ====
Preston East
Party	Candidate	Votes	%	±%
Labour	Kevin Ellard	2,648	57.92	
Conservative	Raymond Johnson	1,105	24.17	
Liberal Democrats	Lydia Livingston	629	13.76	
Respect	Ronald Yates	190	4.15	
Majority		1,543	33.75	
Turnout		4,572	47.86	
Labour win (new seat)				

==== Preston North ====
Preston North
Party	Candidate	Votes	%	±%
Conservative	Geoffrey Driver	2,852	47.87	
Liberal Democrats	William Parkinson	2,003	33.62	
Labour	Alan Woods	1,103	18.51	
Majority		849	14.25	
Turnout		5,958	67.70	
Conservative win (new seat)				

==== Preston North East ====
Preston North East
Party	Candidate	Votes	%	±%
Conservative	Michael Welsh	2,301	39.88	
Labour	William Burke	1,772	30.71	
Liberal Democrats	Richard Hopkin	1,697	29.41	
Majority		529	9.17	
Turnout		5,770	59.51	
Conservative win (new seat)				

==== Preston North West ====
Preston North West
Party	Candidate	Votes	%	±%
Labour	Thomas Burns	2,085	44.55	
Liberal Democrats	Mark Jewell	1,410	30.13	
Conservative	Julie Mullineaux	1,089	23.27	
Respect	Edna Greenwood	96	2.05	
Majority		675	14.42	
Turnout		4,680	57.59	
Labour win (new seat)				

==== Preston Rural ====
Preston Rural
Party	Candidate	Votes	%	±%
Conservative	George Wilkins	3,538	63.47	
Liberal Democrats	Rowena Edmondson	1,126	20.20	
Labour	Pauline Jackson	910	16.33	
Majority		2,412	43.27	
Turnout		5,574	66.71	
Conservative win (new seat)				

==== Preston South East ====
Preston South East
Party	Candidate	Votes	%	±%
Labour	Dorothy Mein	1,849	52.55	
Respect	Sumera Rizwan	650	18.47	
Liberal Democrats	Paul Valentine	516	14.66	
Conservative	Hussain Mulla	504	14.32	
Majority		1,199	34.08	
Turnout		3,519	50.08	
Labour win (new seat)				

==== Preston West ====
Preston West
Party	Candidate	Votes	%	±%
Liberal Democrats	Norman Abram	2,411	45.06	
Labour	Paul Jackson	1,471	27.49	
Conservative	Susan Hudson	1,469	27.45	
Majority		940	17.57	
Turnout		5,351	56.69	
Liberal Democrats win (new seat)				

=== Ribble Valley ===
==== Clitheroe ====
Clitheroe
Party	Candidate	Votes	%	±%
Liberal Democrats	John Sutcliffe	2,935	41.73	
Conservative	Sheila Sims	2,552	36.29	
Labour	Giles Bridge	1,546	21.98	
Majority		383	5.44	
Turnout		7,033	61.21	
Liberal Democrats win (new seat)				

==== Longridge with Bowland ====
Longridge with Bowland
Party	Candidate	Votes	%	±%
Conservative	Mary Wilson			
Liberal Democrats	Jeffrey Flitcroft	1,961	28.41	
Labour	Brenda Lambert	1,088	15.76	
Majority		1,893	27.42	
Turnout		6,903	65.21	
Conservative win (new seat)				

==== Ribble Valley North East ====
Ribble Valley North East
Party	Candidate	Votes	%	±%
Conservative	Albert Atkinson	4,661	56.55	
Liberal Democrats	Margaret Sutcliffe	2,258	27.39	
Labour	Laura Field	1,324	16.06	
Majority		2,403	29.16	
Turnout		8,243	71.70	
Conservative win (new seat)				

==== Ribble Valley South West ====
Ribble Valley South West
Party	Candidate	Votes	%	±%
Conservative	Christopher Holtom	4,212	58.96	
Liberal Democrats	Graham Sowter	1,731	24.23	
Labour	David Hinder	1,201	16.81	
Majority		2,481	34.73	
Turnout		7,144	69.39	
Conservative win (new seat)				

=== Rossendale ===
==== Rossendale East ====
Rossendale East
Party	Candidate	Votes	%	±%
Conservative	James Eaton	2,828	41.65	
Labour	David Hancock	2,661	39.20	
Liberal Democrats	John Glendinning	1,300	19.15	
Majority		167	2.45	
Turnout		6,789	59.63	
Conservative win (new seat)				

==== Rossendale North ====
Rossendale North
Party	Candidate	Votes	%	±%
Labour	Hazel Harding	2,899	44.37	
Conservative	Anthony Winder	2,856	43.71	
Liberal Democrats	Tariq Mahmood	779	11.92	
Majority		43	0.66	
Turnout		6,534	64.77	
Labour win (new seat)				

==== Rossendale South ====
Rossendale South
Party	Candidate	Votes	%	±%
Conservative	Duncan Ruddick	2,627	37.30	
Labour	Alyson Barnes	2,593	36.82	
Liberal Democrats	James Pilling	1,490	21.15	
Green	Linda Hemsley	333	4.73	
Majority		34	0.48	
Turnout		7,043	62.99	
Conservative win (new seat)				

==== Rossendale West ====
Rossendale West
Party	Candidate	Votes	%	±%
Labour	Robert Wilkinson	2,615	50.55	
Conservative	Peter Evans	2,558	49.45	
Majority		57	1.10	
Turnout		5,173	59.57	
Labour win (new seat)				

==== Whitworth ====
Whitworth
Party	Candidate	Votes	%	±%
Labour	Sean Serridge	1,837	34.41	
Conservative	Lynda Barnes	1,528	28.63	
Independent	Ronald Neal	1,238	23.19	
Liberal Democrats	Reginald Lane	735	13.77	
Majority		309	5.78	
Turnout		5,338	57.28	
Labour win (new seat)				

=== South Ribble ===
==== Bamber Bridge and Walton-le-Dale ====
Bamber Bridge and Walton-le-Dale
Party	Candidate	Votes	%	±%
Labour	Graham Davies	2,321	42.19	
Conservative	Carol Chisholm	1,720	31.27	
Idle Toad	John Higgins	741	13.47	
Liberal Democrats	Anthony Hartley	719	13.07	
Majority		601	10.92	
Turnout		5,501	58.37	
Labour win (new seat)				

==== Faringdon ====
Faringdon
Party	Candidate	Votes	%	±%
Labour	Fred Heyworth	2,144	41.03	
Conservative	Kathleen Beattie	1,613	30.86	
Liberal Democrats	Christine Harrison	1,469	28.11	
Majority		531	10.17	
Turnout		5,226	60.10	
Labour win (new seat)				

==== Leyland Central ====
Leyland Central
Party	Candidate	Votes	%	±%
Labour	Matthew Tomlinson	3,441	47.82	
Liberal Democrats	Mark Alcock	2,134	29.66	
Conservative	John Otter	1,620	22.52	
Majority		1,307	18.16	
Turnout		7,195	62.79	
Labour win (new seat)				

==== Leyland South West ====
Leyland South West
Party	Candidate	Votes	%	±%
Labour	Anne Brown	3,402	51.35	
Conservative	Michael Green	1,975	29.81	
Liberal Democrats	Wendy Alcock	1,248	18.84	
Majority		1,427	21.54	
Turnout		6,625	57.42	
Labour win (new seat)				

==== Penwortham North ====
Penwortham North
Party	Candidate	Votes	%	±%
Liberal Democrats	Anthony Pimblett	2,567	39.08	
Conservative	Mary Robinson	2,176	33.13	
Labour	Diane Maier	1,288	19.61	
Independent	David Bennett	537	8.18	
Majority		391	5.95	
Turnout		6,568	70.00	
Liberal Democrats win (new seat)				

==== Penwortham South ====
Penwortham South
Party	Candidate	Votes	%	±%
Labour	Howard Gore	3,239	47.44	
Conservative	Dorothy Gardner	2,316	33.93	
Liberal Democrats	Andrew Jones	1,272	18.63	
Majority		923	13.51	
Turnout		6,827	60.30	
Labour win (new seat)				

==== South Ribble Rural East ====
South Ribble Rural East
Party	Candidate	Votes	%	±%
Idle Toad	Thomas Sharratt	2,619	44.29	
Labour	David Watts	1,660	28.07	
Conservative	Philip Ames	1,634	27.64	
Majority		959	16.22	
Turnout		5,913	60.52	
Idle Toad win (new seat)				

==== South Ribble Rural West ====
South Ribble Rural West
Party	Candidate	Votes	%	±%
Conservative	Keith Young	4,169	53.89	
Labour	Andrew Bennison	2,004	25.91	
Liberal Democrats	Nicholas Sumner	1,563	20.20	
Majority		2,165	27.98	
Turnout		7,736	68.53	
Conservative win (new seat)				

=== West Lancashire ===
==== Ormskirk West ====
Ormskirk West
Party	Candidate	Votes	%	±%
Labour	Francis Williams	2,453	43.62	
Conservative	Valerie Hopley	2,377	42.26	
Green	Maurice George	496	8.82	
Independent	Kenneth Walters	298	5.30	
Majority		76	1.36	
Turnout		5,624	60.58	
Labour win (new seat)				

==== Skelmersdale Central ====
Skelmersdale Central
Party	Candidate	Votes	%	±%
Labour	Terence Aldridge	3,610	73.82	
Liberal Democrats	Alan Spears	738	15.09	
Conservative	Doreen Stephenson	542	11.08	
Majority		2,872	58.73	
Turnout		4,890	42.56	
Labour win (new seat)				

==== Skelmersdale East ====
Skelmersdale East
Party	Candidate	Votes	%	±%
Labour	Robert Pendleton	3,862	60.40	
Conservative	Carolyn Evans	2,532	39.60	
Majority		1,330	20.80	
Turnout		6,394	56.99	
Labour win (new seat)				

==== Skelmersdale West ====
Skelmersdale West
Party	Candidate	Votes	%	±%
Labour	Christopher Cheetham	4,674	80.14	
Conservative	Adrian Owens	1,158	19.86	
Majority		3,516	60.28	
Turnout		5,832	51.18	
Labour win (new seat)				

==== West Lancashire East ====
West Lancashire East
Party	Candidate	Votes	%	±%
Conservative	Richard Shepherd	2,978	47.90	
Labour	Jacqueline Citarella	1,958	31.49	
Liberal Democrats	Henry Reeves	1,281	20.62	
Majority		1,020	16.41	
Turnout		6,217	60.71	
Conservative win (new seat)				

==== West Lancashire North ====
West Lancashire North
Party	Candidate	Votes	%	±%
Conservative	Malcolm Barron	3,596	54.13	
Labour	David Lloyd	1,533	23.08	
Liberal Democrats	Marion Hancock	796	11.98	
Independent	Joan Draper	718	10.81	
Majority		2,063	31.05	
Turnout		6,643	59.79	
Conservative win (new seat)				

==== West Lancashire South ====
West Lancashire South
Party	Candidate	Votes	%	±%
Conservative	David O'Toole	4,041	56.22	
Labour	Paul Cotterill	2,384	33.17	
Green	John Watt	763	10.61	
Majority		1,657	23.05	
Turnout		7,188	63.49	
Conservative win (new seat)				

==== West Lancashire West ====
West Lancashire West
Party	Candidate	Votes	%	±%
Conservative	William Cropper	3,700	51.81	
Labour	Cynthia Dereli	3,441	48.19	
Majority		259	3.62	
Turnout		7,141	60.09	
Conservative win (new seat)				

=== Wyre ===
==== Amounderness ====
Amounderness
Party	Candidate	Votes	%	±%
Conservative	John Shedwick	3,316	57.42	
Labour	Alan Morgan	2,459	42.58	
Majority		857	14.84	
Turnout		5,775	65.01	
Conservative win (new seat)				

==== Fleetwood East ====
Fleetwood East
Party	Candidate	Votes	%	±%
Labour	Clive Grunshaw	3,092	57.65	
Conservative	Mark Hamer	1,537	28.66	
Liberal Democrats	Kenneth Palmerton	734	13.69	
Majority		1,555	28.99	
Turnout		5,363	50.69	
Labour win (new seat)				

==== Fleetwood West ====
Fleetwood West
Party	Candidate	Votes	%	±%
Labour	Vincent Riley	2,621	51.04	
Conservative	William Proctor	1,647	32.08	
Liberal Democrats	Jonathon Bamborough	567	11.04	
UKIP	Gerard Gerrard	300	5.84	
Majority		974	18.96	
Turnout		5,135	54.89	
Labour win (new seat)				

==== Garstang ====
Garstang
Party	Candidate	Votes	%	±%
Conservative	Valerie Wilson	4,355	53.74	
Liberal Democrats	Jack Rogers	1,968	24.28	
Labour	Marilyn Levey	1,781	21.98	
Majority		2,387	29.46	
Turnout		8,104	67.32	
Conservative win (new seat)				

==== Poulton-le-Fylde ====
Poulton-le-Fylde
Party	Candidate	Votes	%	±%
Conservative	Geoffrey Roper	3,753	53.40	
Labour	Alphonse Robert	2,211	31.46	
Liberal Democrats	Kevan Benfold	1,064	15.14	
Majority		1,542	21.94	
Turnout		7,028	63.99	
Conservative win (new seat)				

==== Thornton Cleveleys Central ====
Thornton Cleveleys Central
Party	Candidate	Votes	%	±%
Conservative	Keith Tebbs	2,709	40.64	
Labour	Geoffrey Horrocks	2,368	35.52	
Liberal Democrats	Steven Bate	1,197	17.96	
UKIP	Roy Hopwood	392	5.88	
Majority		341	5.12	
Turnout		6,666	59.83	
Conservative win (new seat)				

==== Thornton Cleveleys North ====
Thornton Cleveleys North
Party	Candidate	Votes	%	±%
Labour	Penelope Martin	643	50.45	
Conservative	Arthur Brooks	2,297	39.41	
UKIP	Henry Wilkinson	591	10.14	
Majority		643	11.04	
Turnout		5,828	58.86	
Labour win (new seat)				

==== Wyreside ====
Wyreside
Party	Candidate	Votes	%	±%
Conservative	Robert Mutch	5,048	64.22	
Labour	Margaret Jackson	2,812	35.78	
Majority		2,236	28.44	
Turnout		7,860	63.67	
Conservative win (new seat)				
