= 1999 South Ribble Borough Council election =

1999 UK local government election

Elections to South Ribble Borough Council were held on 6 May 1999. The whole council was up for election and the council stayed under no overall control.

Composition of the Borough Council after the 1999 election

== Election results ==
South Ribble local election result 1999
Party	Seats	Gains	Losses	Net gain/loss	Seats %	Votes %	Votes	+/−
Labour	21			▼8	38.9	40.1	26,236	
Conservative	18			▲2	33.3	37.8	24,748	
Liberal Democrats	12			▲3	22.2	16.0	10,462	
Independent	3			▲3	5.6	6.1	4,021	

== Ward results ==
All Saints
Party	Candidate	Votes	%	±%
Independent	Barrie Yates	1,313	25.6	
Independent	Tom Sharrat	1,231	24.0	
Independent	W. Bennett	814	15.9	
Labour	B. Greenland	501	9.8	
Conservative	F. Walker	336	6.5	
Conservative	T. Whitehead	313	6.1	
Conservative	J. Walmsley	311	6.1	
Labour	L. Parker	310	6.0	
Labour	A. McCann	302	6.0	

Bamber Bridge Central
Party	Candidate	Votes	%	±%
Labour	B. Pemberton	682	20.7	
Labour	G. Davies	681	20.7	
Labour	D. Banks	628	19.1	
Conservative	G. Woods	469	14.2	
Conservative	C. Chisholm	429	13.0	
Conservative	G. Swallow	404	12.3	

Charnock
Party	Candidate	Votes	%	±%
Conservative	N. Crossley	318	61.0	
Labour	M. Thistlethwaite	203	39.0	

Farington
Party	Candidate	Votes	%	±%
Liberal Democrats	M. Alcock	885	16.1	
Liberal Democrats	J. England	884	16.1	
Liberal Democrats	C. Harrison	878	16.0	
Labour	P. McClelland	545	10.0	
Labour	F. Heyworth	538	9.8	
Labour	D. Wooldridge	468	8.5	
Conservative	M. McNulty	465	8.5	
Conservative	F. Murray	421	7.7	
Conservative	N. Mitchell	417	7.6	

Howick
Party	Candidate	Votes	%	±%
Liberal Democrats	A. Piblett	483	24.0	
Liberal Democrats	N. Sumner	430	21.4	
Independent	R. Ainscough	134	6.7	
Labour	J. Parkinson	118	5.9	
Labour	H. Dubery	115	5.7	
Conservative	M. McNulty	465	8.5	

Hutton & New Longton
Party	Candidate	Votes	%	±%
Conservative	J. Breakwell	1,109	25.5	
Conservative	M. Smith	1,077	24.8	
Conservative	J. Hesketh	1,057	24.3	
Labour	D. Maier	438	10.1	
Labour	R. Taylor	343	7.9	
Labour	M. Walsh	317	7.3	

Kingsfold
Party	Candidate	Votes	%	±%
Labour	Gore H.	689	18.0	
Labour	C. Wooldridge	665	17.4	
Labour	J. Patten	661	17.3	
Conservative	B. Bannister	547	14.3	
Conservative	J. Clement	474	12.4	
Conservative	J. Walmsley	453	11.9	
Liberal Democrats	D. Pimblett	115	3.0	
Liberal Democrats	D. Shaw	109	2.9	
Liberal Democrats	M. Cassel	108	2.8	

Leyland Central
Party	Candidate	Votes	%	±%
Liberal Democrats	G. Armstrong	553	23.9	
Labour	M. Tomlinson	546	23.6	
Liberal Democrats	D. Foster	535	23.2	
Labour	D. Collier	477	20.6	
Conservative	J. Otter	103	4.5	
Conservative	M. Moulding	99	4.3	

Leyland St. Ambrose
Party	Candidate	Votes	%	±%
Liberal Democrats	N. Orrell	734	32.3	
Liberal Democrats	D. Forrest	661	29.1	
Labour	B. Walmsley	371	16.4	
Labour	K. Robinson	344	15.2	
Conservative	D. Walmsley	82	3.6	
Conservative	M. Long	77	3.4	

Leyland St. Johns
Party	Candidate	Votes	%	±%
Labour	W. Evans	886	28.2	
Labour	B. Wilson	813	25.8	
Labour	D. Harrison	799	25.4	
Conservative	D. Eastham	182	5.8	
Conservative	J. Fell	160	5.1	
Conservative	F. Redfern	157	5.0	
Liberal Democrats	A. Edwin	150	4.8	

Leyland St. Marys
Party	Candidate	Votes	%	±%
Liberal Democrats	J. Knowles	626	14.0	
Liberal Democrats	M. Duckworth	605	13.5	
Labour	J. Lewis	577	13.0	
Labour	M. Titherington	575	12.9	
Liberal Democrats	M. Edwin	561	12.5	
Labour	D. Wynn	555	12.4	
Conservative	G. Cross	348	7.8	
Conservative	G. Owen	316	7.1	
Conservative	N. Morris	308	6.9	

Little Hoole & Much Hoole
Party	Candidate	Votes	%	±%
Conservative	D. Suthers	766	35.3	
Conservative	E. Webster	678	31.3	
Labour	D. Webster	326	15.0	
Labour	D. Turner	292	13.5	
Liberal Democrats	G. Garratt	54	2.5	
Liberal Democrats	J. Edwin	52	2.4	

Longton Central & West
Party	Candidate	Votes	%	±%
Conservative	D. Suthers	766	35.3	
Conservative	E. Webster	678	31.3	
Labour	D. Webster	326	15.0	
Labour	D. Turner	292	13.5	
Liberal Democrats	G. Garratt	54	2.5	
Liberal Democrats	J. Edwin	52	2.4	

Lostock Hall
Party	Candidate	Votes	%	±%
Conservative	J. Hughes	946	21.4	
Conservative	K. Beattie	877	19.8	
Conservative	D. Parkinson	849	19.2	
Labour	J. Pownall	603	13.6	
Labour	S. Owen	589	13.3	
Labour	D. Fletcher	559	12.6	

Manor
Party	Candidate	Votes	%	±%
Liberal Democrats	D. Howarth	657	26.8	
Liberal Democrats	J. Marchant	626	25.5	
Conservative	M. Askew	428	17.5	
Conservative	F. Almond	402	16.4	
Labour	G. Bailey	175	7.1	
Labour	G. Holt	163	6.7	

Middleforth Green
Party	Candidate	Votes	%	±%
Labour	D. Bretherton	542	26.4	
Labour	D. Pownall	515	25.1	
Conservative	M. Gardner	385	18.8	
Conservative	K. Fell	382	18.6	
Liberal Democrats	M. Garratt	124	6.0	
Liberal Democrats	V. Howarth	104	5.1	

Moss Side
Party	Candidate	Votes	%	±%
Labour	A. Brown	765	24.0	
Labour	G. Lewis	708	22.2	
Labour	J. Minall	663	20.8	
Conservative	B. Baker	290	9.1	
Conservative	R.Hughes	282	8.8	
Conservative	D. Hayton	275	8.6	
Liberal Democrats	M. Simmonds	204	6.4	

Priory
Party	Candidate	Votes	%	±%
Conservative	R. Haworth	493	27.8	
Conservative	A. Simmons	446	25.2	
Labour	R. Durham	276	15.6	
Labour	B. Taylor	232	13.1	
Liberal Democrats	W. Bryce	170	9.6	
Liberal Democrats	G. Jenkins	154	8.7	

Samlesbury & Cuerdale
Party	Candidate	Votes	%	±%
Conservative	S. Long	200	59.2	
Independent	F. Cassidy	138	40.8	

Seven Stars
Party	Candidate	Votes	%	±%
Labour	A. Dawson	629	39.5	
Labour	J. Kelly	627	39.4	
Conservative	D. Baker	177	11.1	
Conservative	M. Fryer	160	10.0	

Walton Le Dale
Party	Candidate	Votes	%	±%
Conservative	J. Lawson	789	20.4	
Conservative	H. Clarkson	627	20.1	
Conservative	K. Palmer	758	19.6	
Labour	S. Bennett	551	14.3	
Labour	M. Davies	521	13.5	
Labour	J. Fernandez	465	12.0	
