= Idle Toad =

The Idle Toad
- Leader: Tom Sharratt
- Founded: 30 January 2003
- Dissolved: 1 November 2014
- Headquarters: 14 Coupe Green, Hoghton, Preston, PR5 0JR
- Ideology: Localism

Website
- http://lob.org.uk/Idletoad/

The Idle Toad was a local political party in England, which held seats in the South Ribble district of Lancashire and Lancashire County Council between 1997 and 2013.

== History ==
The party originated in 1997, when Labour Party councillor and former Lancashire Evening Telegraph journalist Tom Sharratt was deselected. He started printing a local newsletter, named the Idle Toad, the successor to his Labour News publication from 1981, and stood thereafter under this description, holding both his South Ribble Rural East on Lancashire County Council and Coupe Green and Gregson Lane seat on South Ribble District Council. They stood seven candidates in South Ribble in 1999, as a label but not a formal party. The newsletter, a "mix of local news and digs at the Labour Party", had 9,000 readers. They first used the description "Labour Philosophical and Recreational Teaching Institution" (Labour PARTI), but Idle Toad stuck.

Sharratt formed Idle Toad as a party with fellow councillor Barrie Yates in 2002. It was registered with the Electoral Commission on 30 January 2003. The party was community based and not linked to any specific political ideology. In 2003 it fielded six candidates and also had parish councillors. It held Coupe Green and Gregson Lane by 15 votes over the Conservatives in 2004.

The party had three councillors on South Ribble District Council by 2007. Yates and Jim Marsh, another party councillor, resigned from the party that year, joining the Conservative Party soon after in 2008. Sharratt was brought before the standards committee of South Ribble council, due to a comment in the Idle Toad newsletter describing Marsh as a "defacator". Sharratt countered that this was a misprint, and should have described him as a "defector". He was censured and ordered to apologise to Marsh. He later won an appeal to this order.

=== Decline and dissolution ===
Following the 2013 county council elections for Lancashire, the Idle Toad Party was left with no remaining councillors. It was statutorily deregistered by the UK electoral commission in November 2014. LGC Plus said, "Voters in Lancashire have ended the reign of the UK’s most strangely-named political party". Colin Rallings and Michael Thrasher later wrote, "Readers of a certain age will regret the demise of the Idle Toad party". John Rentoul named it among the top ten party names.

== See also ==
- List of Labour Party breakaway parties (UK)
