= Lancashire County Council elections =

Local government elections in Lancashire, England

Lancashire County Council elections are held every four years. Lancashire County Council is the upper-tier authority for the non-metropolitan county of Lancashire in England. Since the last boundary changes in 2017, 84 councillors have been elected from 82 electoral divisions.

== Election results ==
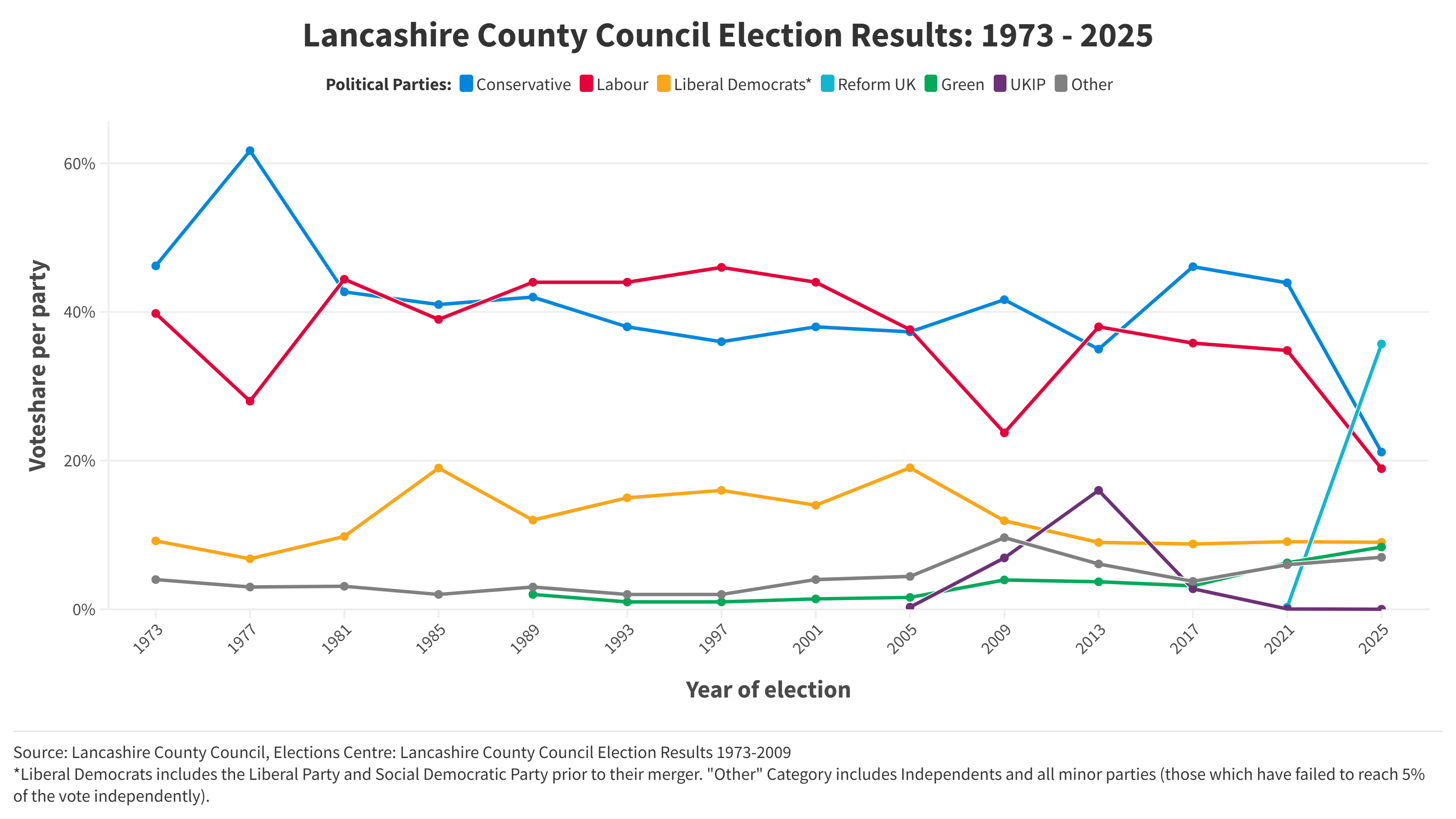
Lancashire County Council election results, vote share per party by year since 1973. Post-merger Liberal Party and Social Democratic Party counted as 'other' parties.

=== Council composition ===
The composition of the council immediately following election, and excluding any subsequent by-election changes, has been:

	Overall control	Cons.	Labour	Reform UK	Lib Dems (Note: Includes Alliance and Liberal Party. Excludes post-merger Liberals.)	Green	UKIP	BNP	Idle Toad	Independents/Other
2025	Reform	8	5	53	5	4	0	0	-	9 (Note: 7 Independent, 2 Our West Lancashire)
2021	Conservative	48	32	-	2	2	0	-	-	0
2017	Conservative	46	30	-	4	1	1	0	-	2 (Note: 2 Independent.)
2013	NOC	35	39	-	6	1	0	0	0	3 (Note: 3 Independent.)
2009	Conservative	51	16	-	10	2	0	1	1	3 (Note: 3 Independent.)
2005	Labour	31	44	-	6	1	0	0	1	1 (Note: Independent.)
2001	Labour	26	44	-	6	1	-	-	-	1 (Note: Independent.)
1997	Labour	23	47	-	7	0	-	-	-	1 (Note: Independent.)
1993	Labour	35	54	-	10	0	-	-	-	0
1989	Labour	42	50	-	4	0	-	-	-	3 (Note: 3 Liberals.)
1985	Labour	42	48	-	9	-	-	-	-	0
1981	Labour	38	53	-	6	-	-	-	-	2 (Note: 2 Residents' Association.)
1977	Conservative	83	12	-	1	-	-	-	-	0
1973	Conservative	52	33	-	7	-	-	-	-	4 (Note: 3 Independent, 1 Residents' Association.)

== Council elections ==
- 1973 Lancashire County Council election
- 1977 Lancashire County Council election
- 1981 Lancashire County Council election (new division boundaries)
- 1985 Lancashire County Council election
- 1989 Lancashire County Council election
- 1993 Lancashire County Council election
- 1997 Lancashire County Council election
- 2001 Lancashire County Council election
- 2005 Lancashire County Council election (new division boundaries)
- 2009 Lancashire County Council election
- 2013 Lancashire County Council election
- 2017 Lancashire County Council election (new division boundaries)
- 2021 Lancashire County Council election
- 2025 Lancashire County Council election

== County result maps ==
2005 results map

2009 results map

2013 results map

2017 results map

2021 results map

2025 results map

== By-election results ==
=== Elections in the 1990s ===
Hesketh By-Election 13 June 1996
Party	Candidate	Votes	%	±%
Labour		2,263	53.1	
Conservative		2,004	46.9	
Majority		259	6.2	
Turnout		4,267	37.9	
Labour hold		Swing		

Marine By-Election 10 June 1999
Party	Candidate	Votes	%	±%
Labour		1,644	60.4	−5.3
Conservative		1,076	39.6	+5.3
Majority		568	20.8	
Turnout		2,720	31.1	
Labour hold		Swing		

South Ribble Central By-Election 16 September 1999
Party	Candidate	Votes	%	±%
Labour		751	38.5	−11.2
Conservative		636	32.6	−2.2
Liberal Democrats		565	28.9	+13.4
Majority		115	5.9	
Turnout		1,952	17.9	
Labour hold		Swing		

Nelson By-Election 2 March 2000
Party	Candidate	Votes	%	±%
Labour		1,358	48.6	−5.8
Liberal Democrats		1,296	46.3	+14.7
Conservative		143	5.1	−8.8
Majority		62	2.3	
Turnout		2,797	29.0	
Labour hold		Swing		

=== Elections in the 2000s ===
South Ribble South By-Election 4 May 2000
Party	Candidate	Votes	%	±%
Liberal Democrats		1,721	48.5	−4.8
Labour		1,198	33.8	+3.2
Conservative		627	17.7	+2.1
Majority		523	14.7	
Turnout		3,546	32.0	
Liberal Democrats hold		Swing		

West Lancashire South By-Election 4 May 2000
Party	Candidate	Votes	%	±%
Conservative		2,242	70.6	+9.2
Labour		933	29.4	−6.8
Majority		1,309	41.2	
Turnout		3,175	30.4	
Conservative hold		Swing		

South Ribble North West By-Election 22 November 2001
Party	Candidate	Votes	%	±%
Liberal Democrats	Anthony Pimblett	1,518	48.8	+13.7
Conservative	P Wakeling	1,232	39.6	+4.7
Labour	D Lyon	358	11.5	−18.4
Majority		286	9.2	
Turnout		3,108		
Liberal Democrats hold		Swing		

Preston Rural West By-Election 1 May 2003
Party	Candidate	Votes	%	±%
Conservative	William Parkinson	1,781	49.8	+20.1
Liberal Democrats	Howard Henshaw	1,205	33.7	−14.8
Labour	Jean Al-Serraj	590	16.5	−5.2
Majority		576	16.1	
Turnout		3,576	28.2	
Conservative gain from Liberal Democrats		Swing		

Thornton Cleveleys Central By-Election 7 February 2008
Party	Candidate	Votes	%	±%
Conservative	Jim Lawrenson	1,536	48.3	+7.7
Labour	Wayne Martin	934	29.4	−6.1
UKIP	Olive Bergin	489	15.4	+9.5
Liberal Democrats	Philip Pitman	220	6.9	−11.1
Majority		602	18.9	
Turnout		3,175=9		
Conservative hold		Swing		

=== Elections in the 2010s ===
Burnley Central East by-election, 6 May 2010
Party	Candidate	Votes	%	±%
Labour	Misfar Hassan	3,157	44.35	+4.75
Liberal Democrats	Martin Smith	2,279	32.01	−5.95
BNP	Paul McDevitt	868	12.19	+2.14
Conservative	Matthew Isherwood	815	11.45	−0.94
Majority		878	12.3	
Turnout				
Labour gain from Liberal Democrats		Swing		

Wyreside by-election, 28 October 2011
Party	Candidate	Votes	%	±%
Conservative	Vivien Taylor	2,178	58.00	−7.86
Labour	Kevin Higginson	877	23.36	+10.30
UKIP	Simon Noble	361	9.61	N/A
Green	Susan White	339	9.03	−12.06
Majority		1,301		
Turnout		3,762		
Conservative hold		Swing		

Lancaster East by-election, 6 May 2016
Party	Candidate	Votes	%	±%
Labour	Lizzi Collinge	1,758	50.85	+5.95
Green	Tim Hamilton-Cox	1,408	40.73	−0.27
Liberal Democrats	Robin Long	231	6.68	N/A
TUSC	Steve Metcalfe	60	1.74	N/A
Majority		350	10.1	
Turnout				
Labour hold		Swing		

Chorley Rural North by-election, 21 July 2016
Party	Candidate	Votes	%	±%
Conservative	Alan Cullens	1,144	43.76	+2.65
Labour	Yvonne Hargreaves	1,042	38.37	+0.57
UKIP	Christopher Stuart	303	11.16	−6.15
Liberal Democrats	Stephen Fenn	125	4.60	+0.83
Majority		102	3.9	
Turnout				
Conservative hold		Swing		

Burnley Central East by-election, 3 November 2016
Party	Candidate	Votes	%	±%
Labour	Sobia Malik	1,348	68.88	+10.74
Liberal Democrats	Emma Payne	276	14.10	−1.42
UKIP	Mark Girven	249	12.72	−6.68
Green	Laura Fisk	84	4.29	N/A
Majority		1,072		
Turnout				
Labour hold		Swing		

Wyre Rural Central by-election, 11 January 2018
Party	Candidate	Votes	%	±%
Conservative	Matthew Salter	1,745	60.03	−6.11
Labour	Nic Fogg	925	31.82	+11.01
Green	Susan White	237	8.15	−4.90
Majority		820	59.86	
Turnout				
Conservative hold		Swing		

Morecambe North by-election, 15 February 2018
Party	Candidate	Votes	%	±%
Conservative	Stuart Morris	1,332	48.95	−14.23
Liberal Democrats	Andrew Severn	809	29.73	+21.58
Labour	Darren Clifford	580	21.32	−0.71
Majority		523		
Conservative hold		Swing		

=== Elections in the 2020s ===
Chorley Rural west by-election, 14 September 2023
Party	Candidate	Votes	%	±%
Labour	Alan Whittaker	1,642	52.1	+11.1
Conservative	Val Caunce	1,279	40.6	−7.9
Liberal Democrats	Rowan Powers	231	7.3	+2.0
Majority		363		
Turnout				
Labour gain from Conservative		Swing		

Burnley Central West by-election, 26 October 2023
Party	Candidate	Votes	%	±%
Green	Scott Cunliffe	630		
Labour	Charles Briggs	583		
Conservative	Donald Whitaker	574		
Liberal Democrats	Jeff Sumner	156		
Majority		47		
Green hold				

The Burnley Central West by-election was triggered by the resignation of Green councillor Andy Fewings.
