= 1977 Lancashire County Council election =

Local election in Lancashire, England

1977 Lancashire County Council Election
← 1973	5 May 1977	1981 →

All 96 seats on Lancashire County Council 48 seats needed for a majority

	First party	Second party	Third party
Party	Conservative	Labour	Liberal
Last election	52 seats, 46.3 %	33 seats, 39.8 %	7 seats, 6.8 %
Seats after	83	12	1
Seat change	▲31	▼21	▼6
Popular vote	261,435	118,706	28,622
Percentage	61.7 %	28.0 %	6.8 %
Swing	▲15.5 ppt	▼11.8 ppt	▼2.4 ppt
Leader before election
Conservative
Elected Leader
Conservative

Elections were held to Lancashire County Council as part of the wider 1977 United Kingdom local elections. An overwhelming Conservative majority was returned, with significant swings from Labour towards the Conservatives across the county. The Conservatives therefore retained control of the council.

== Results ==
1977 Lancashire County Council elections
Party	This election			Full council			This election		
Party	Seats	Net	Seats %	Other	Total	Total %	Votes	Votes %	+/−
Conservative	83	▲31	86.5		83	86.5	261,435	61.7	▲15.5
Labour	12	▼21	12.5		12	12.5	118,706	28.0	▼11.8
Liberal	1	▼6	0.0		1	0.0	28,622	6.8	▼2.4
National Front	0	Steady	0		0	0	7,153	1.7	▲1.3
Independent	0	▼3	0		0	0	4,613	1.1	▼1.7
National Party	0	NEW	0		0	0	1,110	0.3	NEW
Communist	0	NEW	0		0	0	1,093	0.3	NEW
Residents	0	▼1	0		0	0	945	0.2	▼0.5
New Britain	0	NEW	0		0	0	22	0.0	NEW

== Ward results ==
Accrington No. 1
Party	Candidate	Votes	%	±%
Conservative	H. Taylor	1,907	53.2	▲10.3
Labour	B. Whitham	1160	32.4	▼24.7
Liberal	F. Chapman	272	7.6	NEW
National Front	K. Dobson	246	6.9	NEW
Majority		747	20.8	▲6.6
Conservative gain from Labour		Swing	▲17.5	

Accrington No. 2
Party	Candidate	Votes	%	±%
Conservative	J. Hindley	1,400	41.5	▲6.7
Labour	W. Haines*	1346	39.9	▼25.3
National Front	D. Riley	379	11.2	NEW
Liberal	D. O'Hanlon	187	5.5	NEW
Communist	M. Dearden	60	1.8	NEW
Majority		54	1.6	▼28.8
Conservative gain from Labour		Swing	▲16.0	

Accrington No. 3
Party	Candidate	Votes	%	±%
Conservative	M. Martin	1,903	51.2	▼4.0
Labour	D. Keeley	1142	30.7	▼14.1
Liberal	W. Matthews	388	10.4	NEW
National Front	C. Dower	283	7.6	NEW
Majority		761	20.5	▲10.1
Conservative hold		Swing	▲5.1	

Bacup
Party	Candidate	Votes	%	±%
Conservative	D. Wood*	2,549	70.8	▲15.4
Labour	H. Sutcliffe	1053	29.2	▼15.4
Majority		1496	41.5	▲30.7
Conservative hold		Swing	▲15.4	

Barnoldswick
Party	Candidate	Votes	%	±%
Conservative	J. Maisey	2,687	42.9	▲20.7
Labour	R. Hill*	1937	30.9	▼7.2
Liberal	J. Bebbington	1639	26.2	▲1.9
Majority		750	12.0	▼1.8
Conservative gain from Labour		Swing	▲14.0	

Blackburn No. 1
Party	Candidate	Votes	%	±%
Conservative	T. Marsden	3,542	63.5	▲25.9
Labour	D. Cave	1464	26.2	▲11.0
National Party	G. Hudson	572	10.3	NEW
Majority		1988	37.3	▲27.6
Conservative gain from Residents		Swing	▲36.6	

Blackburn No. 2
Party	Candidate	Votes	%	±%
Labour	E. Smith*	1,605	53.3	▼19.0
Conservative	K. Bolton	1052	35.0	▲7.3
National Party	D. Rowbotham	216	7.2	NEW
National Front	J. Whittaker	136	4.5	NEW
Majority		553	18.4	▼26.2
Labour hold		Swing	▼13.2	

Blackburn No. 3
Party	Candidate	Votes	%	±%
Labour	L. Proos*	2,524	57.1	▲7.7
Conservative	A. Hutchinson	1654	37.4	▲15.2
Communist	G. Davies	245	5.5	NEW
Majority		870	19.7	▼1.2
Labour hold		Swing	▼3.8	

Blackburn No. 4
Party	Candidate	Votes	%	±%
Labour	H. White*	1,022	32.1	▼5.5
Liberal	F. Beetham	914	28.8	▼6.9
Conservative	F. Lewis	800	25.2	▲15.3
National Party	J. Read Kingsley	322	10.1	NEW
National Front	E. Adamson	121	3.8	▼13.0
Majority		108	3.4	▲1.5
Labour hold		Swing	▲0.7	

Blackburn No. 5
Party	Candidate	Votes	%	±%
Conservative	D. Murray*	3,847	87.7	▲29.6
Labour	D. Smith	541	12.3	▼9.2
Majority		3306	75.3	▲47.0
Conservative hold		Swing	▲19.4	

Blackburn No. 6
Party	Candidate	Votes	%	±%
Conservative	J. Cutler	1,871	52.8	▲7.3
Labour	J. Mason*	1674	47.2	▼7.3
Majority		197	5.6	▼3.4
Conservative gain from Labour		Swing	▲7.3	

Blackburn No. 7
Party	Candidate	Votes	%	±%
Conservative	R. Wood	2,713	53.2	▲17.9
Labour	J. Bury*	1859	36.4	▼5.3
National Front	G. Hughes	529	10.4	▼12.6
Majority		854	16.7	▲10.2
Conservative gain from Labour		Swing	▲11.6	

Blackburn Rural
Party	Candidate	Votes	%	±%
Conservative	G. Nickson*	4,622	85.2	▲23.0
Labour	A. Barton	804	14.8	▼2.0
Majority		3818	70.4	▲29.2
Conservative hold		Swing	▲12.5	

Blackpool No. 1
Party	Candidate	Votes	%	±%
Conservative	H. Jackson*	3,159	80.9	▲16.6
Labour	G. Ross	604	15.5	▼20.2
National Front	T. Parry	143	3.7	NEW
Majority		2555	65.4	▲36.8
Conservative hold		Swing	▲18.4	

Blackpool No. 2
Party	Candidate	Votes	%	±%
Conservative	T. Percival*	2,617	72.8	▲17.4
Labour	W. Garmston	859	23.9	▼20.7
National Front	A. Haworth	119	3.3	NEW
Majority		1758	48.9	▲38.0
Conservative hold		Swing	▲19.1	

Blackpool No. 3
Party	Candidate	Votes	%	±%
Conservative	L. Broughton*	2,448	79.8	▲27.5
Labour	R. Lewis	508	16.6	▼5.2
National Front	M. Roberts	111	3.6	NEW
Majority		1940	63.3	▲36.9
Conservative hold		Swing	▲16.4	

Blackpool No. 4
Party	Candidate	Votes	%	±%
Conservative	R. Hook	2,731	55.7	▲18.7
Labour	L. Pomfret	2044	41.7	▲10.0
National Front	C. Michaels	130	2.7	NEW
Majority		687	14.0	▲8.7
Conservative hold		Swing	▲4.4	

Blackpool No. 5
Party	Candidate	Votes	%	±%
Conservative	J. Battersby*	2,735	67.2	▲11.8
Labour	E. Kirton	1227	30.2	▼14.4
National Front	M. Agnew	107	2.6	NEW
Majority		1508	37.1	▲26.2
Conservative hold		Swing	▲13.1	

Blackpool No. 6
Party	Candidate	Votes	%	±%
Conservative	R. Jacobs*	2,022	59.1	▲21.2
Labour	S. Wright	1198	35.0	▼1.2
National Front	A. Hanson	203	5.9	NEW
Majority		824	24.1	▲22.4
Conservative hold		Swing	▲11.2	

Blackpool No. 7
Party	Candidate	Votes	%	±%
Conservative	R. Dewhirst*	2,464	65.0	▲23.8
Labour	E. Allcock	1090	28.7	▲2.4
National Front	A. Machin	239	6.3	NEW
Majority		1374	36.2	▲27.5
Conservative hold		Swing	▲10.7	

Blackpool No. 8
Party	Candidate	Votes	%	±%
Conservative	J. Metcalf	2,991	72.3	▲14.3
Labour	D. Elgee	1029	24.9	▼17.1
National Front	J. Kay	117	2.8	NEW
Majority		1962	47.4	▲31.4
Conservative hold		Swing	▲15.7	

Blackpool No. 9
Party	Candidate	Votes	%	±%
Conservative	J. Cox*	2,919	75.7	▲14.8
Labour	J. Trickett	769	20.0	▼19.1
National Front	V. Gledhill	117	2.8	NEW
Majority		2150	55.8	▲33.9
Conservative hold		Swing	▲16.9	

Blackpool No. 10
Party	Candidate	Votes	%	±%
Conservative	G. Baguley	3,802	72.0	▲42.0
Labour	P. Hall	1309	24.8	▲6.2
National Front	A. Timms	166	3.1	NEW
Majority		2493	47.2	▲26.0
Conservative gain from Independent		Swing	▲46.6	

Blackpool No. 11
Party	Candidate	Votes	%	±%
Conservative	D. Hanson	2,218	57.2	▲21.5
Labour	H. Derbyshire	1545	39.8	▼24.5
National Front	A. Hardy	116	3.0	NEW
Majority		673	17.3	▼11.2
Conservative gain from Labour		Swing	▲23.0	

Brierfield
Party	Candidate	Votes	%	±%
Conservative	K. Sumner-Clough*	4,325	66.2	▲24.7
Liberal	A. Dixon	1216	18.6	▼13.3
Labour	K. Firman	996	15.2	▼11.4
Majority		3109	47.6	▲38.0
Conservative hold		Swing	▲19.0	

Burnley No. 1
Party	Candidate	Votes	%	±%
Conservative	F. Brown	2,479	51.4	▲16.7
Labour	I. Wilson	1860	38.6	▼5.0
Liberal	E. Roberts	480	10.0	▼11.7
Majority		619	12.8	▲4.0
Conservative gain from Labour		Swing	▲10.8	

Burnley No. 2
Party	Candidate	Votes	%	±%
Labour	F. Booth*	1,687	47.9	▼2.4
Conservative	S. Nightingale	1461	41.5	▲15.8
Liberal	J. Anforth	373	10.6	▼13.4
Majority		226	6.4	▼18.1
Labour hold		Swing	▼9.1	

Burnley No. 3
Party	Candidate	Votes	%	±%
Conservative	M. Tate	2,291	50.4	▲20.9
Labour	J. Entwistle*	1883	41.5	▼11.5
Liberal	E. Roberts	368	8.1	▼9.5
Majority		408	9.0	▼14.4
Conservative gain from Labour		Swing	▲20.9	

Burnley No. 4
Party	Candidate	Votes	%	±%
Conservative	F. Bailey	2,323	50.8	▲13.8
Labour	C. Platt*	2248	49.2	▼13.8
Majority		75	1.6	▼24.3
Conservative gain from Labour		Swing	▲13.8	

Burnley No. 5
Party	Candidate	Votes	%	±%
Labour	J. Keller*	2,404	50.8	▼0.1
Conservative	L. Bullock	1709	41.6	▲19.9
Majority		695	1.6	▼20.0
Labour hold		Swing	▼10.0	

Burnley Rural
Party	Candidate	Votes	%	±%
Conservative	J. Wyld*	2,827	69.3	▲3.4
Labour	C. Burt	887	21.7	▼12.4
Liberal	R. Puckering	365	8.9	NEW
Majority		1940	47.6	▲15.8
Conservative hold		Swing	▲7.9	

Chorley North East
Party	Candidate	Votes	%	±%
Conservative	M. Beechey	2,631	63.4	▲32.3
Labour	J. Crook	1517	36.6	▼12.8
Majority		1114	26.9	▲8.6
Conservative gain from Labour		Swing	▲22.5	

Chorley Rural No. 1
Party	Candidate	Votes	%	±%
Conservative	M. Case	3,071	61.6	▲23.3
Labour	J. Meadows*	1914	38.4	▼23.3
Majority		1157	23.2	▼0.3
Conservative gain from Labour		Swing	▲23.3	

Chorley Rural No. 2
Party	Candidate	Votes	%	±%
Conservative	A. Ambrose*	4,033	74.3	▲26.1
Labour	P. Howat	948	17.5	▼13.7
Liberal	M. Farnworth	446	8.2	▼12.5
Majority		3085	56.8	▲39.8
Conservative hold		Swing	▲19.9	

Chorley Rural No. 3
Party	Candidate	Votes	%	±%
Conservative	J. Moorcroft	3,712	77.3	▲29.2
Labour	F. Higson	1088	22.7	▼8.5
Majority		2624	54.7	▲37.7
Conservative hold		Swing	▲18.8	

Chorley South West
Party	Candidate	Votes	%	±%
Conservative	M. Blackburn	3,123	60.8	▲21.3
Labour	A. Watmough	1624	31.6	▼12.0
Liberal	F. Wilson	388	7.6	▼9.3
Majority		1499	29.2	▲25.1
Conservative gain from Labour		Swing	▲16.6	

Clayton-Le-Moors
Party	Candidate	Votes	%	±%
Conservative	P. Galbraith*	2,581	62.6	▲22.0
Labour	L. Dickinson	1079	26.2	▼14.1
Liberal	H. Batty	294	7.1	NEW
National Front	J. Dwyer	168	4.1	NEW
Majority		1502	36.4	▲36.1
Conservative hold		Swing	▲18.0	

Clitheroe
Party	Candidate	Votes	%	±%
Conservative	H. Eastwood	2,933	63.0	▲19.9
Labour	B. Braithwaite	1725	37.0	▲8.5
Majority		1208	25.9	▲11.5
Conservative hold		Swing	▲5.7	

Colne No. 1
Party	Candidate	Votes	%	±%
Conservative	A. O'Connell	2,047	52.7	▲19.8
Liberal	J. Smithson	936	24.1	▼18.9
Labour	A. Pickup	899	23.2	▼1.0
Majority		1111	28.6	▲18.6
Conservative gain from Liberal		Swing	▲19.3	

Colne No. 2
Party	Candidate	Votes	%	±%
Liberal	A. Greaves*	1,886	45.7	▼3.5
Conservative	K. Hodgson	1596	38.7	▲17.0
Labour	A. McGrath	643	15.6	▼13.5
Majority		290	7.0	▼13.1
Liberal hold		Swing	▼10.3	

Darwen No. 1
Party	Candidate	Votes	%	±%
Conservative	C. Dodgson	2,123	53.5	▲21.2
Liberal	C. Grills*	1214	30.6	▼11.9
Labour	D. Alder	630	15.9	▼9.3
Majority		909	22.9	▲12.7
Conservative gain from Liberal		Swing	▲16.6	

Darwen No. 2
Party	Candidate	Votes	%	±%
Conservative	R. Wiggans	1,993	53.1	▲16.1
Labour	C. Jones*	952	25.4	▼19.4
Liberal	P. Browne	809	21.6	▲3.3
Majority		1041	27.7	▲19.9
Conservative gain from Labour		Swing	▲17.8	

Darwen No. 3
Party	Candidate	Votes	%	±%
Conservative	A. Bland*	2,409	59.0	▲25.4
Liberal	C. Talbot	1024	25.1	▼17.2
Labour	T. Dewhurst	649	15.9	▼8.1
Majority		1385	33.9	▲25.2
Conservative gain from Liberal		Swing	▲21.3	

Fleetwood North
Party	Candidate	Votes	%	±%
Conservative	W. Brown*	1,931	59.3	▲4.5
Labour	A. Fleming	793	24.4	▼20.8
Liberal	D. Green	416	12.8	NEW
National Front	J. Wilson	114	3.5	NEW
Majority		1138	35.0	▲25.3
Conservative hold		Swing	▲12.7	

Fleetwood South
Party	Candidate	Votes	%	±%
Conservative	E. Funk*	2,434	69.8	▲13.0
Labour	R. Fox	908	26.0	▼17.2
National Front	B. Meeson	146	4.2	NEW
Majority		1526	43.8	▲30.3
Conservative hold		Swing	▲15.1	

Fulwood No. 1
Party	Candidate	Votes	%	±%
Conservative	T. Croft*	3,391	82.6	▲3.7
Labour	A. Richardson	492	12.0	▼9.2
Liberal	C. Merron	224	5.5	NEW
Majority		2899	70.6	▲12.9
Conservative hold		Swing	▲6.4	

Fulwood No. 2
Party	Candidate	Votes	%	±%
Conservative	M. Horam*	3,428	81.1	▲2.9
Labour	R. Sumner	483	11.4	▼10.4
Liberal	A. Carmichael	316	7.5	NEW
Majority		2945	69.7	▲13.3
Conservative hold		Swing	▲6.7	

Fylde No. 1
Party	Candidate	Votes	%	±%
Conservative	R. Spencer*	2,133	47.7	▲7.6
Residents	R. Fisher	945	21.1	NEW
Independent conservative	J. Payne	785	17.6	NEW
Liberal	D. Rose	306	6.8	NEW
Labour	D. Atkins	250	5.6	▼13.7
National Front	H. Hughes	50	1.1	NEW
Majority		1188	26.6	▲26.1
Conservative gain from Independent		Swing	▲24.1	

Fylde No. 2
Party	Candidate	Votes	%	±%
Conservative	A. Kirkham	2,573	69.7	▲19.3
Liberal	M. Gilbert	1025	27.8	▼6.0
National Front	A. Ward	94	2.5	NEW
Majority		1548	41.9	▲25.3
Conservative hold		Swing	▲12.7	

Garstang No. 1
Party	Candidate	Votes	%	±%
Conservative	D. Elletson*	3,210	83.7	N/A'"`UNIQ−−ref−000000D8−QINU`"'
Labour	A. Hawton	494	12.9	NEW
National Front	J. O'Donnell	129	3.4	NEW
Majority		3833	70.9	N/A
Conservative hold		Swing	N/A	

Garstang No. 2
Party	Candidate	Votes	%	±%
Conservative	Fitzherbert-Brockholes	3,655	74.2	N/A'"`UNIQ−−ref−000000DD−QINU`"'
Liberal	B. Flood-Page	968	19.6	NEW
Labour	D. Fleming	249	5.1	NEW
National Front	J. Millington	56	1.1	NEW
Majority		2687	54.5	N/A
Conservative hold		Swing	N/A	

Great Harwood
Party	Candidate	Votes	%	±%
Conservative	F. Worsley*	3,449	59.9	▲3.0
Labour	F. Parkinson	1498	26.0	▼17.1
Liberal	I. Kitchin	357	7.9	NEW
National Front	M. Last	352	6.1	NEW
Majority		1951	33.9	▲20.1
Conservative hold		Swing	▲10.0	

Haslingden
Party	Candidate	Votes	%	±%
Conservative	G. Woodcock*	3,535	61.1	▲5.8
Labour	M. Cowpe	1634	28.2	▼16.5
Liberal	R. Holden	620	10.7	NEW
Majority		1901	32.8	▲22.3
Conservative hold		Swing	▲11.1	

Lancaster No. 1
Party	Candidate	Votes	%	±%
Conservative	J. Taylor	2,140	50.8	▲12.4
Labour	E. Jones*	1985	45.4	▼8.1
Liberal	S. Shuttleworth	245	5.6	NEW
Majority		155	3.5	▼13.4
Conservative gain from Labour		Swing	▲10.1	

Lancaster No. 2
Party	Candidate	Votes	%	±%
Conservative	A. Morris	2,516	50.8	▲15.9
Labour	M. Cantley*	1862	37.6	▼14.5
Liberal	P. Walker	576	5.6	NEW
Majority		654	13.2	▼4.0
Conservative gain from Labour		Swing	▲15.9	

Lancaster No. 3
Party	Candidate	Votes	%	±%
Conservative	T. Hayton*	3,134	61.9	▲3.3
Labour	J. O'Donnell	1406	27.8	▼13.6
Liberal	J. Claxton	520	10.3	NEW
Majority		1728	34.2	▲16.9
Conservative hold		Swing	▲8.5	

Lancaster Rural No. 1
Party	Candidate	Votes	%	±%
Conservative	M. Bates*	Unopposed		
Majority				
Conservative hold		Swing		

Lancaster Rural No. 2
Party	Candidate	Votes	%	±%
Conservative	G. Bowring*	Unopposed		
Majority				
Conservative hold		Swing		

Lancaster Rural No. 3
Party	Candidate	Votes	%	±%
Conservative	C. Pickard*	2,487	72.4	▲2.4
Labour	H. Prideaux	575	16.7	▼13.2
Liberal	M. Brown	372	10.8	NEW
Majority		1912	55.7	▲15.6
Conservative hold		Swing	▲7.8	

Leyland No. 1
Party	Candidate	Votes	%	±%
Conservative	W. Jackson	2,361	50.7	▲24.3
Liberal	N. Orrell*	1451	31.2	▼7.2
Labour	L. Day	844	18.1	▼17.1
Majority		910	19.5	▲16.4
Conservative gain from Liberal		Swing	▲15.8	

Leyland No. 2
Party	Candidate	Votes	%	±%
Labour	J. Haigh	1,888	53.5	▼11.1
Conservative	J. Heys	1435	40.7	NEW
Liberal	D. Mann	205	5.8	▼29.6
Majority		453	12.8	▼16.3
Labour hold		Swing	▼25.9	

Longridge
Party	Candidate	Votes	%	±%
Conservative	C. Coulston*	5,111	87.9	▲39.9
Labour	W. Vass	703	12.1	NEW
Majority		4408	75.8	▲71.7
Conservative gain from Independent conservative		Swing	▲46.0	

Lytham St. Annes No. 1
Party	Candidate	Votes	%	±%
Conservative	J. Gouldbourn*	3,183	74.2	▲3.5
Labour	N. Horridge	883	20.6	▼8.6
National Front	J. Kay	221	5.2	NEW
Majority		2300	53.7	▲12.1
Conservative hold		Swing	▲6.1	

Lytham St. Annes No. 2
Party	Candidate	Votes	%	±%
Conservative	T. Carter*	3,264	85.8	▲11.0
Labour	R. Collins	442	11.1	▼14.1
National Front	K. Warburton	118	3.1	NEW
Majority		2842	74.7	▲25.0
Conservative hold		Swing	▲12.5	

Lytham St. Annes No. 3
Party	Candidate	Votes	%	±%
Conservative	J. Finn*	4,057	85.4	▲18.2
Labour	K. Miller	550	11.6	▼21.2
National Front	C. Callaby	142	3.0	NEW
Majority		3507	73.8	▲39.3
Conservative hold		Swing	▲19.7	

Morecambe & Heysham No. 1
Party	Candidate	Votes	%	±%
Conservative	G. Robinson*	3,248	79.5	N/A'"`UNIQ−−ref−0000011A−QINU`"'
Labour	L. Holmes	840	20.5	NEW
Majority		2408	58.9	N/A
Conservative hold		Swing	N/A	

Morecambe & Heysham No. 2
Party	Candidate	Votes	%	±%
Conservative	J. Elliott*	3,039	72.3	▲19.8
Labour	A. Leach	1163	27.7	▼19.8
Majority		1876	44.6	▲39.6
Conservative hold		Swing	▲19.8	

Morecambe & Heysham No. 3
Party	Candidate	Votes	%	±%
Conservative	R. Quick*	2,995	69.6	N/A'"`UNIQ−−ref−00000123−QINU`"'
Labour	B. Wolfenden	1311	30.4	NEW
Majority		1684	39.1	N/A
Conservative hold		Swing	N/A	

Nelson North
Party	Candidate	Votes	%	±%
Labour	J. Helmn*	1,966	44.9	▼3.2
Conservative	C. Kemp	1437	32.9	▲13.0
Liberal	T. Holt	971	22.2	▼8.6
Majority		529	12.1	▼6.1
Labour hold		Swing	▼8.6	

Nelson South
Party	Candidate	Votes	%	±%
Conservative	J. Fletcher	2,873	49.3	▲11.6
Labour	B. Akrigg	2217	38.0	▼24.2
Liberal	P. Berry	738	12.7	NEW
Majority		656	11.3	▼13.3
Conservative gain from Labour		Swing	▲17.9	

Ormskirk No. 1
Party	Candidate	Votes	%	±%
Conservative	J. Aspinwall*	4,129	71.6	▲18.9
Labour	M. Rees	1641	28.4	▼18.9
Majority		2592	45.7	▲37.8
Conservative hold		Swing	▲18.9	

Ormskirk No. 2
Party	Candidate	Votes	%	±%
Conservative	H. Ballance*	3,282	68.1	▲16.5
Labour	A. Williams	1537	31.9	▼16.5
Majority		1745	36.2	▲33.1
Conservative hold		Swing	▲16.5	

Oswaldtwistle
Party	Candidate	Votes	%	±%
Conservative	T. Renshaw	2,549	66.5	▲11.7
Liberal	H. Wilkinson	600	15.7	NEW
Independent Labour	F. O'Rourke	545	14.2	NEW
Communist	T. Marshall	137	3.6	NEW
Majority		1949	50.9	▲41.2
Conservative hold		Swing	▲28.4	

Padiham
Party	Candidate	Votes	%	±%
Conservative	J. Brown	2,096	58.5	▲18.9
Labour	F. Markham	1485	41.5	▼18.9
Majority		611	17.1	▼3.8
Conservative gain from Labour		Swing	▲18.9	

Poulton-Le-Fylde
Party	Candidate	Votes	%	±%
Conservative	F. Lofthouse	4,417	91.5	▲18.5
National Front	C. Taylor	408	8.5	NEW
Majority		4009	83.1	▲37.0
Conservative hold		Swing	▲22.7	

Preston No. 1
Party	Candidate	Votes	%	±%
Conservative	H. Merriweather	4,549	58.1	▲12.2
Conservative	A. Scarsbrook	4,190		
Labour	G. Walmsley	2545	33.1	▼21.1
Labour	A. Howard	2435		
Liberal	G. Wilkins	1334	8.9	NEW
Majority		3759	25.0	▲16.7
Conservative gain from Labour		Swing	▲16.6	
Conservative gain from Labour		Swing		

Preston No. 2
Party	Candidate	Votes	%	±%
Labour	F. McGrath	1,498	37.0	▼1.2
Conservative	M. Birtle	1269	31.3	NEW
Liberal	G. Payne*	1079	26.6	▼11.6
National Front	M. Gibson	182	4.5	NEW
New Britain	A. Hall	22	0.5	NEW
Majority		229	5.7	▲5.6
Labour gain from Liberal		Swing	▲5.2	

Preston No. 3
Party	Candidate	Votes	%	±%
Conservative	E. Kerr	1,824	43.5	▲4.1
Labour	G. Higney	1749	41.7	▼19.0
Liberal	S. Davies	379	9.0	NEW
National Front	J. Massey	186	4.4	NEW
Communist	M. Waterfield	58	1.4	NEW
Majority		75	1.8	▼19.5
Conservative gain from Labour		Swing	▲11.5	

Preston No. 4
Party	Candidate	Votes	%	±%
Labour	H. Parker*	4,585	51.4	▼11.9
Labour	C. Sharples*	4,274		
Conservative	K. Peet	3708	42.4	▲5.8
Conservative	J. McGrath	3599		
National Front	M. Scott	1061	11.3	NEW
Majority		1552	9.0	▼17.7
Labour hold		Swing	▼8.9	
Labour hold		Swing		

Preston No. 5
Party	Candidate	Votes	%	±%
Labour	J. Farrington	1,962	47.9	▼29.5
Conservative	K. Cartwright	1419	34.6	▲12.0
Independent	J. Billington	462	11.3	NEW
National Front	A. Fletcher	203	5.0	NEW
Communist	B. Struszczak	51	1.2	NEW
Majority		543	13.3	▼41.6
Labour hold		Swing	▼20.8	

Preston Rural No. 1
Party	Candidate	Votes	%	±%
Conservative	M. Ryan*	3,479	90.0	▲16.0
Labour	J. Prance	387	10.0	▼16.0
Majority		3092	80.0	▲32.0
Conservative hold		Swing	▲16.0	

Preston Rural No. 2
Party	Candidate	Votes	%	±%
Conservative	W. Winn*	4,138	72.4	▲6.6
Labour	M. Lyons	1031	18.0	▼16.2
Liberal	L. Fletcher	549	9.6	NEW
Majority		3107	54.3	▲22.9
Conservative hold		Swing	▲11.4	

Preston Rural No. 3
Party	Candidate	Votes	%	±%
Conservative	J. Jenkinson	3,350	58.7	▲26.2
Independent conservative	V. Peacock	1742	30.5	NEW
Labour	S. Hubberstey	612	10.7	▼11.1
Majority		3107	54.3	▲22.9
Conservative hold		Swing	▲18.7	

Rawtenstall No. 1
Party	Candidate	Votes	%	±%
Conservative	M. Ingham	3,112	63.8	▲17.7
Labour	K. Alty	1560	32.0	▼21.9
Communist	R. Waddington	206	4.2	NEW
Majority		1552	31.8	▲24.0
Conservative gain from Labour		Swing	▲19.8	

Rawtenstall No. 2
Party	Candidate	Votes	%	±%
Conservative	A. King	2,413	62.3	▲11.3
Labour	E. Harvey	1039	26.8	▼22.2
Liberal	J. Gledhill	290	7.5	NEW
Communist	H. Malley	133	3.4	NEW
Majority		1374	35.5	▲33.6
Conservative hold		Swing	▲16.8	

Skelmersdale & Holland No. 1
Party	Candidate	Votes	%	±%
Conservative	T. Baxter	2,337	56.4	N/A'"`UNIQ−−ref−0000016C−QINU`"'
Labour	J. Prunty*	1600	38.6	N/A
Communist	T. Aldridge	203	4.9	NEW
Majority		737	17.8	N/A
Conservative gain from Labour		Swing	N/A	

Skelmersdale & Holland No. 2
Party	Candidate	Votes	%	±%
Labour	L. Ellman*	2,824	57.4	N/A'"`UNIQ−−ref−00000171−QINU`"'
Conservative	A. Evans	2099	42.6	N/A
Majority		725	14.7	N/A
Labour hold		Swing	N/A	

Thornton Cleveleys No. 1
Party	Candidate	Votes	%	±%
Conservative	C. Ashworth*	3,224	75.4	▲8.9
Labour	W. Goldsmith	933	21.8	▼11.7
National Front	R. Farr	120	2.8	NEW
Majority		2291	53.6	▲20.7
Conservative hold		Swing	▲10.3	

Thornton Cleveleys No. 2
Party	Candidate	Votes	%	±%
Conservative	F. Townend*	3,423	81.8	▲12.5
Labour	R. Godfrey	672	16.0	▼14.7
National Front	G. Tregower	92	2.2	NEW
Majority		2751	65.7	▲27.2
Conservative hold		Swing	▲13.6	

Walton-Le-Dale No. 1
Party	Candidate	Votes	%	±%
Conservative	R. Welham*	3,242	71.1	▲11.2
Labour	J. Dickinson	1001	21.9	▼18.1
Liberal	R. Murphy	318	7.0	NEW
Majority		2241	49.1	▲29.3
Conservative hold		Swing	▲14.7	

Walton-Le-Dale No. 2
Party	Candidate	Votes	%	±%
Conservative	G. Woods*	2,336	60.5	▲16.1
Labour	K. Sharples	1523	39.5	▼3.7
Majority		813	21.1	▲19.9
Conservative hold		Swing	▲9.9	

West Lancashire No. 1
Party	Candidate	Votes	%	±%
Conservative	J. Ashton*	2,567	65.6	▼11.0
Independent	E. Cropper	1079	27.6	NEW
Labour	B. Brown	267	6.8	▼16.6
Majority		1488	38.0	▼15.1
Conservative hold		Swing	▼19.3	

West Lancashire No. 2
Party	Candidate	Votes	%	±%
Conservative	R. Kirby	3,685	89.1	▲16.2
Labour	P. Swift	453	10.9	▼16.2
Majority		3232	78.1	▲32.3
Conservative hold		Swing	▲16.2	

Whitworth
Party	Candidate	Votes	%	±%
Conservative	J. Clegg*	1,610	57.6	▲14.7
Liberal	G. Foulds	1185	42.4	▼14.7
Majority		425	15.2	▲1.1
Conservative gain from Liberal		Swing	▲14.7	
