= 1993 Lancashire County Council election =

1993 UK local government election

Elections to Lancashire County Council were held in May 1993.

This was the last election at which Blackburn with Darwen and Blackpool participated in Lancashire elections.

== Ward results ==
=== Blackburn ===
Seat	Winning Party	Majority
Bank Top and Brookhouse	Labour	1,322
Billinge and Revidge	Conservative	821
Brownhill and Pleckgate	Conservative	312
Cathedral and Green Bank	Labour	1,180
Darwen South and Turton	Liberal Democrats	178
Earcroft and West Rural	Conservative	848
Ewood and Higher Croft	Labour	1,127
Mill Hill and Moorgate	Labour	482
Queens Park and Shadsworth	Labour	1,224
Sudell and Sunnyhurst	Labour	455

=== Blackpool ===
Seat	Winning Party	Majority
Alexandra and Victoria	Labour	633
Anchorsolme and Norbreck	Conservative	994
Bispham and Ingthorpe	Conservative	61
Brunswick and Claremont	Labour	948
Clifton and Marton	Conservative	183
Foxhall and Talbot	Labour	569
Greenlands and Warbreck	Labour	6
Hawes Side and Tydesley	Labour	565
Highfield and Stanley	Conservative	734
Layton and Park	Labour	631
Squires Gate and Waterloo	Conservative	1,003

=== Burnley ===
Seat	Winning Party	Majority
Burnley Central East	Labour	990
Burnley Central West	Labour	862
Burnley North East	Labour	1,861
Burnley Rural	Labour	828
Burnley South West	Labour	1,302
Burnley West	Labour	1,233

=== Chorley ===
Seat	Winning Party	Majority
Chorley East	Labour	1,315
Chorley North	Labour	209
Chorley Rural East	Conservative	72
Chorley Rural North	Conservative	845
Chorley Rural West	Conservative	583
Chorley West	Labour	1,817

=== Fylde ===
Seat	Winning Party	Majority
Fylde East	Conservative	1,046
Fylde West	Conservative	797
Lytham	Conservative	981
St Annes North	Conservative	1,276
St Annes South	Liberal Democrats	52

=== Hyndburn ===
Accrington Central - electorate 6,474
Party	Candidate	Votes	%	±%
Labour	Doreen Pollit	1,422		
Conservative	T. Siddique	796		
Natural Law	P Brown	91		
Turnout		2,309		
Labour hold		Swing		

Accrington South - electorate 10,333
Party	Candidate	Votes	%	±%
Labour	Wendy Dwyer	1,666		
Conservative	Derek Scholes	1,198		
Liberal Democrats	J Jones	1,167		
Natural Law	PA Madden	28		
Turnout		4,049		
Labour gain from SDP		Swing		

Church & Accrington North - electorate 11,419
Party	Candidate	Votes	%	±%
Labour	Jean Battle	2,650		
Conservative	Stan Horne	1,701		
Natural Law	T Simpson	121		
Turnout		4,472		
Labour hold		Swing		

Great Harwood - electorate 8,075
Party	Candidate	Votes	%	±%
Labour	George Slynn	2,127		
Conservative	M Bullock	1,301		
Natural Law	JS Koehurst	102		
Turnout		3,530		
Labour hold		Swing		

Oswaldtwistle - electorate 11,424
Party	Candidate	Votes	%	±%
Labour	Dorothy Westell	2,580		
Conservative	Doug Heyes	1,822		
Natural Law	E Martin	95		
Turnout		4,497	39%	
Labour gain from Conservative		Swing		

Rishton, Clayton & Altham - electorate 10,854
Party	Candidate	Votes	%	±%
Labour	Kath Thom	2,708		
Conservative	D Haworth	1,583		
Natural Law	M J B Brierley	88		
Turnout		4.379	40%	

=== Lancaster ===
Seat	Winning Party	Majority
Heysham	Conservative	553
Lancaster City	Labour	1,133
Lancaster East	Labour	1,581
Lancaster Rural Central	Conservative	861
Lancaster Rural North	Conservative	804
Lancaster Rural South	Liberal Democrats	499
Morecambe East	Conservative	299
Morecambe West	Labour	933
Skerton	Labour	1,211

=== Pendle ===
Seat	Winning Party	Majority
Colne	Liberal Democrats	431
Nelson	Labour	1,673
Pendle East	Liberal Democrats	213
Pendle North	Liberal Democrats	1,083
Pendle South	Labour	1,900
Pendle West	Conservative	163

=== Preston ===
Seat	Winning Party	Majority
Preston Central East	Labour	1,364
Preston Central West	Labour	621
Preston East	Labour	1,239
Preston North	Liberal Democrats	52
Preston Rural East	Conservative	1,992
Preston Rural West	Liberal Democrats	697
Preston South East	Labour	1,404
Preston South West	Labour	1,095
Preston West	Labour	440

=== Ribble Valley ===
Seat	Winning Party	Majority
Clitheroe	Liberal Democrat	1,038
Longridge	Conservative	1,120
Ribble Valley North East	Conservative	1,369
Ribble Valley South West	Conservative	1,296

=== Rossendale ===
Seat	Winning Party	Majority
Bacup	Conservative	402
Haslingden	Labour	80
Rossendale East	Labour	809
Rossendale West	Labour	545
Whitworth	Labour	344

=== South Ribble ===
Seat	Winning Party	Majority
South Ribble Central	Labour	771
South Ribble East	Labour	787
South Ribble North	Labour	377
South Ribble North West	Conservative	854
South Ribble South	Liberal Democrats	605
South Ribble South West	Labour	2,234
South Ribble West	Conservative	1,094

=== West Lancashire ===
Seat	Winning Party	Majority
Ormskirk	Labour	77
Skelmersdale Central	Labour	2,522
Skelmersdale East	Labour	1,725
Skelmersdale West	Labour	2,868
West Lancashire East	Conservative	138
West Lancashire North	Conservative	1,491
West Lancashire South	Conservative	877

=== Wyre ===
Seat	Winning Party	Majority
Amounderness	Conservative	801
Cleveleys	Labour	47
Garstang	Conservative	875
Hesketh	Labour	668
Hillhouse	Conservative	271
Marine	Labour	281
Poulton-le-Fylde	Conservative	930
Wyre Side	Conservative	1,166
