= Pleckgate High School =

Location
- Pleckgate Road; Blackburn, Lancashire, BB1 8QA; England
- Coordinates: 53°46′04″N 2°29′18″W

Information
- Type: Academy
- Local authority: Blackburn with Darwen
- Department for Education URN: 142088 Tables
- Ofsted: Reports
- Head teacher: Aishling McGinty
- Gender: Mixed
- Age: 11 to 16
- Enrolment: 1,189 as of January 2016
- Website: pleckgate.com

Pleckgate High School is a mixed, Ofsted rated Outstanding secondary school located in Blackburn, Lancashire, England.

Previously a community school and Mathematics and Computing College administered by Blackburn with Darwen Borough Council, in February 2016 Pleckgate High School converted to academy status. The school is now sponsored by The Education Partnership Trust, but continues to coordinate with Blackburn with Darwen Borough Council for admissions.

The current Headteacher of the Academy is Aishling McGinty, who took up post in September 2022.

Upon being inspected by Ofsted, in January 2019, the school received a judgement of 'Outstanding' in all categories.
