= 1997 Lancashire County Council election =

1997 UK local government election

Elections to Lancashire County Council were held in May 1997 on the same day as the 1997 United Kingdom general election.

== Ward results ==
=== Burnley ===
Seat	Result	Majority
Burnley Central East	Labour	371
Burnley Central West	Labour	2,230
Burnley North East	Labour	3,112
Burnley Rural	Labour	1,690
Burnley South West	Labour	2,127
Burnley West	Labour	2,293

=== Chorley ===
Seat	Winning Party	Majority
Chorley East	Labour	2,989
Chorley North	Labour	1,062
Chorley Rural East	Labour	60
Chorley Rural North	Conservative	363
Chorley Rural West	Labour	691
Chorley West	Labour	2,862

=== Fylde ===
Seat	Winning Party	Majority
Fylde East	Conservative	1,509
Fylde West	Conservative	1,633
Lytham	Conservative	2,367
St Annes North	Conservative	1,276
St Annes South	Conservative	52

=== Hyndburn ===
Accrington Central
Party	Candidate	Votes	%	±%
Labour	Doreen Pollit	2,880		
Conservative	SG Crook	1,453		
Turnout		4,333		
Labour hold		Swing		

Accrington South
Party	Candidate	Votes	%	±%
Labour	Wendy Dwyer	3,794		
Conservative	Derek Scholes	2,566		
Liberal Democrats	Tim Whitchelo	998		
Turnout		7,358		
Labour hold		Swing		

Church & Accrington North
Party	Candidate	Votes	%	±%
Labour	Jean Battle	4,601		
Conservative	AC Barter	2,405		
Liberal Democrats	Malcolm Pritchard	1,312		
Turnout		8,318		
Labour hold		Swing		

Great Harwood
Party	Candidate	Votes	%	±%
Labour	George Slynn	2,824		
Conservative	Wyn Frankland	2,112		
Liberal Democrats	M Gradwell	1,076		
Turnout		6.012		
Labour hold		Swing		

Oswaldtwistle
Party	Candidate	Votes	%	±%
Labour	Dorothy Westell	4,871		
Conservative	Brian Walmsley	3,854		
Turnout		8,725		
Labour hold		Swing		

Rishton, Clayton & Altham
Party	Candidate	Votes	%	±%
Labour	Ian Ormerod	4,541		
Conservative	Rennie Pinder	3,367		
Turnout		7,908		
Labour hold		Swing		

=== Lancaster ===
Seat	Winning Party	Majority
Heysham	Labour	1,600
Lancaster City	Labour	1,531
Lancaster East	Labour	3,006
Lancaster Rural Central	Conservative	1,539
Lancaster Rural North	Conservative	1,141
Lancaster Rural South	Liberal Democrats	459
Morecambe East	Labour	242
Morecambe West	Labour	2,168
Skerton	Labour	3,097

=== Pendle ===
Seat	Winning Party	Majority
Colne	Labour	197
Nelson	Labour	1,569
Pendle East	Liberal Democrats	213
Pendle North	Liberal Democrats	1,083
Pendle South	Labour	1,900
Pendle West	Conservative	163

=== Preston ===
Seat	Winning Party	Majority
Preston Central East	Labour	1,364
Preston Central West	Labour	621
Preston East	Labour	1,239
Preston North	Liberal Democrats	52
Preston Rural East	Conservative	1,992
Preston Rural West	Liberal Democrats	697
Preston South East	Labour	1,404
Preston South West	Labour	1,095
Preston West	Labour	440

=== Ribble Valley ===
Seat	Winning Party	Majority
Clitheroe	Liberal Democrat	1,038
Longridge	Conservative	1,120
Ribble Valley North East	Conservative	1,369
Ribble Valley South West	Conservative	1,296

=== Rossendale ===
Seat	Winning Party	Majority
Bacup	Conservative	402
Haslingden	Labour	80
Rossendale East	Labour	809
Rossendale West	Labour	545
Whitworth	Labour	344

=== South Ribble ===
Seat	Winning Party	Majority
South Ribble Central	Labour	771
South Ribble East	Labour	787
South Ribble North	Labour	377
South Ribble North West	Conservative	854
South Ribble South	Labour	560
South Ribble South West	Labour	2,234
South Ribble West	Conservative	1,094

=== West Lancashire ===
Seat	Winning Party	Majority
Ormskirk	Labour	77
Skelmersdale Central	Labour	2,522
Skelmersdale East	Labour	1,725
Skelmersdale West	Labour	2,868
West Lancashire East	Conservative	138
West Lancashire North	Conservative	1,491
West Lancashire South	Conservative	877

=== Wyre ===
Seat	Winning Party	Majority
Amounderness	Conservative	801
Cleveleys	Labour	47
Garstang	Conservative	875
Hesketh	Labour	668
Hillhouse	Conservative	271
Marine	Labour	281
Poulton-le-Fylde	Conservative	930
Wyre Side	Conservative	1,166
