= 2001 Lancashire County Council election =

2001 UK local government election

Elections to Lancashire County Council were held in June 2001 on the same day as the 2001 United Kingdom general election. The Labour Party held overall control of the council.

== Ward results ==
=== Burnley ===
Seat	Winning Party	Majority
Burnley Central East	Labour	1,990
Burnley Central West	Labour	730
Burnley North East	Labour	1,816
Burnley Rural	Labour	651
Burnley South West	Labour	413
Burnley West	Labour	518

=== Chorley ===
Seat	Winning Party	Majority
Chorley East	Labour	2,574
Chorley North	Conservative	978
Chorley Rural East	Conservative	95
Chorley Rural North	Conservative	440
Chorley Rural West	Labour	787
Chorley West	Labour	2,168

=== Fylde ===
Seat	Winning Party	Majority
Fylde East	Conservative	1,148
Fylde West	Conservative	1,761
Lytham	Conservative	1,966
St Annes North	Conservative	873
St Annes South	Conservative	711

=== Hyndburn ===
Accrington Central - electorate 6,680
Party	Candidate	Votes	%	±%
Labour	Doreen Pollit	2,143		
Conservative	Munsif Dad	1,366		
	Spoilt	74		
Turnout		3,583	54%	
Labour hold		Swing		

Accrington South - electorate 9,978
Party	Candidate	Votes	%	±%
Labour	Wendy Dwyer	3,361		
Conservative	Derek Scholes	2,234		
	Spoilt	107		
Turnout		5,702	57%	
Labour hold		Swing		

Church & Accrington North - electorate 11,253
Party	Candidate	Votes	%	±%
Labour	Jean Battle	4,231		
Conservative	Joan Pilkington	2,350		
	Spoilt	114		
Turnout		6,695	59%	
Labour hold		Swing		

Great Harwood - electorate 8,181
Party	Candidate	Votes	%	±%
Labour	George Slynn	2,390		
Conservative	Wyn Frankland	2,296		
	Spolit	68		
Turnout		6.012	58%	
Labour hold		Swing		

Oswaldtwistle - electorate 11,771
Party	Candidate	Votes	%	±%
Labour	Dorothy Westell	3,865		
Conservative	Doug Hayes	3,049		
	Spoilt	100		
Turnout		7,014	60%	
Labour hold		Swing		

Rishton, Clayton & Altham -electorate 11,334
Party	Candidate	Votes	%	±%
Labour	Michael Hindley	3,742		
Conservative	Rennie Pinder	2,776		
	Spolit	97		
Turnout		6,651		
Labour hold		Swing		

=== Lancaster ===
Seat	Winning Party	Majority
Heysham	Labour	1,279
Lancaster City	Green	327
Lancaster East	Labour	1,560
Lancaster Rural Central	Conservative	1,530
Lancaster Rural North	Conservative	1,254
Lancaster Rural South	Conservative	36
Morecambe East	Labour	282
Morecambe West	Labour	1,402
Skerton	Labour	2,079

=== Pendle ===
Seat	Winning Party	Majority
Colne	Labour	1,024
Nelson	Labour	1,069
Pendle East	Liberal Democrats	769
Pendle North	Liberal Democrats	216
Pendle South	Labour	1,795
Pendle West	Conservative	2,098

=== Preston ===
Seat	Winning Party	Majority
Preston Central East	Labour	1,291
Preston Central West	Labour	1,283
Preston East	Labour	1,614
Preston North	Liberal Democrats	244
Preston Rural East	Conservative	2,189
Preston Rural West	Conservative	576
Preston South East	Labour	1,734
Preston South West	Labour	1,532
Preston West	Labour	1,104

=== Ribble Valley ===
Seat	Winning Party	Majority
Clitheroe	Liberal Democrat	567
Longridge	Conservative	935
Ribble Valley North East	Conservative	1,685
Ribble Valley South West	Conservative	2,260

=== Rossendale ===
Seat	Winning Party	Majority
Bacup	Conservative	315
Haslingden	Labour	430
Rossendale East	Labour	364
Rossendale West	Labour	841
Whitworth	Labour	283

=== South Ribble ===
Seat	Winning Party	Majority
South Ribble Central	Labour	841
South Ribble East	Independent	424
South Ribble North	Labour	1,271
South Ribble North West	Liberal Democrats	2,677
South Ribble South	Labour	560
South Ribble South West	Labour	2,459
South Ribble West	Conservative	2,007

=== West Lancashire ===
Seat	Winning Party	Majority
Ormskirk	Labour	633
Skelmersdale Central	Labour	3,395
Skelmersdale East	Labour	1,521
Skelmersdale West	Labour	2,658
West Lancashire East	Conservative	314
West Lancashire North	Conservative	2,734
West Lancashire South	Conservative	1,594

=== Wyre ===
Seat	Winning Party	Majority
Amounderness	Conservative	311
Cleveleys	Conservative	132
Garstang	Conservative	1,976
Hesketh	Labour	1,541
Hillhouse	Conservative	19
Marine	Labour	1,588
Poulton-le-Fylde	Conservative	1,265
Wyre Side	Conservative	2,395
