= 1989 Lancashire County Council election =

1989 UK local government election

Elections to Lancashire County Council were held in May 1989.

== Results ==
=== By ward ===
Accrington Central
Party	Candidate	Votes	%	±%
Labour	Doreen Pollit	1,847	72.7	
Conservative	A Turner	479	18.9	
SLD	B Derbyshire	215	8.5	
Turnout		2,441	35.0	

Accrington South
Party	Candidate	Votes	%	±%
SLD	J Jones	1,515	36.3	
Conservative	J Scholes	1,463	35.0	
Labour	Mirsa Yousef	1,201	28.7	
Turnout		4,179	40.1	

Alexandria & Victoria
Party	Candidate	Votes	%	±%
Labour	G Holland	1,748	49.0	
Conservative	H Hunt	1,267	35.5	
SLD	J Simpson	445	12.5	
Independent	S Jenkinson	109	3.1	
Turnout		3,469	37.6	

Amounderness
Party	Candidate	Votes	%	±%
Conservative	E Mellalieu	2,298	62.6	
Labour	E Pacey	1,375	37.4	
Turnout		3,673	41.2	

Alexandria & Victoria
Party	Candidate	Votes	%	±%
Labour	G Holland	1,748	49.0	
Conservative	H Hunt	1,267	35.5	
SLD	J Simpson	445	12.5	
Independent	S Jenkinson	109	3.1	
Turnout		3,469	37.6	

Anchorsholme & Norbreck
Party	Candidate	Votes	%	±%
Conservative	J Preston	2,341	53.9	
Labour	H Schofield	1,363	31.4	
SLD	F Batten	636	14.7	
Turnout		4,340	38.5	

Bacup
Party	Candidate	Votes	%	±%
Labour	D Baron	1,910	46.9	
Conservative	K Holt	1,778	43.7	
SLD	D Whatmough	383	9.4	
Turnout		4,071	49.3	

Bank Top & Brookhouse
Party	Candidate	Votes	%	±%
Conservative	Abdul Bhikha	2,048	49.8	
Labour	L Proos	1,809	44.0	
SLD	A Knott	252	6.1	
Turnout		4,109	44.8	

Billinge & Revidge
Party	Candidate	Votes	%	±%
Conservative	J Ridd	2,371	60.5	
Labour	P Greenwood	1,169	29.8	
SLD	G Foulds	377	9.6	
Turnout		3,917	39.0	

Bispham & Ingthorpe
Party	Candidate	Votes	%	±%
Conservative	T Percival	1,747	60.5	
Labour	A Drinkwater	1,717	40.8	
SLD	J Horan	743	17.7	
Turnout		4,207	34.9	

Brownhill & Pleckgate
Party	Candidate	Votes	%	±%
Conservative	A Law-Riding	2,675	51.3	
Labour	M Higginson	2,224	42.7	
SLD	A Knott	311	6.0	
Turnout		5,320	47.3	

Brunswick & Claremont
Party	Candidate	Votes	%	±%
Labour	E Kirton	2,684	63.1	
Conservative	J Herdman	1,567	36.9	
Turnout		4,251	40.2	

Brunswick & Claremont
Party	Candidate	Votes	%	±%
Labour	F Booth	2,693	72.4	
Conservative	P Jackson	545	14.6	
Green	W Bennett	375	10.1	
PLO	D McNee	109	2.9	
Turnout		3,722	36.5	

Church & Accrington North
Party	Candidate	Votes	%	±%
Labour	Peter Billington	2,896		
Conservative	R Wallis	1,652		
SDP	M Height	369		
Turnout		4,917		

Peter Billington resigned, and a by election was held on 13 June 1991.

Church & Accrington North
Party	Candidate	Votes	%	±%
Labour	Jack Grime	2,112		
Conservative	W Parkinson	1,351		
Liberal Democrats	T W Witchelo	639		
Turnout		4,102		

Great Harwood
Party	Candidate	Votes	%	±%
Labour	George Slynn	2,508		
Conservative	S A Munt	1,580		
Turnout		4,088		

Oswaldtwistle
Party	Candidate	Votes	%	±%
Conservative	Peter Britcliffe	2,914		
Labour	Eddie Neville	2,698		
Turnout		5,512		

Peter Britcliffe resigned on 1 February 1993, within three months of the 1993 County Elections. Therefore, no by election was held.

Rishton, Clayton & Altham
Party	Candidate	Votes	%	±%
Labour	Chris Stone	2,654		
Conservative	P Bibby	2,332		
Turnout		4,985		
