= 1973 Lancashire County Council election =

1973 English local election

1973 Lancashire County Council Election
- 12 April 1973

All 96 seats on Lancashire County Council 48 seats needed for a majority

	First party	Second party	Third party
Party	Conservative	Labour	Liberal
Seats after	52	33	7
Percentage	46.2%	39.8%	9.2%
Elected Leader
Conservative

Following its reconstitution under the Local Government Act 1972, elections were held for Lancashire County Council on 12 April 1973. All 94 wards were up for election and all wards returned one councillor by FPTP, with the exception of Preston No. 1 and Preston No. 4, which returned two councillors each by plurality block voting. A Conservative majority was returned.

== Results Summary ==
1973 Lancashire County Council election
Party	This election				Full council			This election		
Party	Candidates	Seats	Net	Seats %	Other	Total	Total %	Votes	Votes %	+/−
Conservative	92	52	N/A	54.2		52	54.2	186,414	46.2	N/A
Labour	90	33	N/A	34.4		33	34.4	160,277	39.8	N/A
Liberal	28	7	N/A	7.3		7	7.3	36,917	9.2	N/A
Independent	5	3	N/A	3.1		3	3.1	11,374	2.8	N/A
Residents	2	1	N/A	1.04		1	1.04	3,268	0.8	N/A
People Rep	1	0	N/A	0.0		0	0.0	1,817	0.5	N/A
National Front	2	0	N/A	0.0		0	0.0	1,710	0.4	N/A
Democratic Labour	1	0	N/A	0.0		0	0.0	1,198	0.3	N/A

== Ward results ==
Accrington No. 1
Party	Candidate	Votes	%	±%
Labour	W. Wallwork	2,156	57.1	
Conservative	M. Martin	1620	42.9	
Majority		536	14.2	

Accrington No. 2
Party	Candidate	Votes	%	±%
Labour	W. Haines	2,346	65.2	
Conservative	W. Stanton	1251	34.8	
Majority		1095	30.4	

Accrington No. 3
Party	Candidate	Votes	%	±%
Conservative	R. Webster	2,000	55.2	
Labour	J. Madden	1624	44.8	
Majority		376	10.4	

Bacup
Party	Candidate	Votes	%	±%
Conservative	D. Wood	2,173	55.4	
Labour	F. Haworth	1741	44.6	
Majority		422	10.8	

Barnoldswick
Party	Candidate	Votes	%	±%
Labour	R. Hill	2,413	38.1	
Liberal	D. Robinson	1539	24.3	
Conservative	T. Moss	1407	22.2	
Ind. Conservative	G. Preston	969	15.3	
Majority		874	13.8	

Blackburn No. 1
Party	Candidate	Votes	%	±%
Residents	M. Rigby	2,409	47.2	
Conservative	F. Lewis	1915	37.6	
Labour	A. Brookfield	775	15.2	
Majority		494	9.7	

Blackburn No. 2
Party	Candidate	Votes	%	±%
Labour	E. Smith	2,167	72.3	
Conservative	J. Jones	830	27.7	
Majority		1337	44.6	

Blackburn No. 3
Party	Candidate	Votes	%	±%
Labour	L. Proos	2,078	49.4	
Democratic Labour	M. Mcnamee	1198	28.5	
Conservative	P. Shillitoe	934	22.2	
Majority		880	20.9	

Blackburn No. 4
Party	Candidate	Votes	%	±%
Labour	H. White	1,453	37.6	
Liberal	F. Beetham	1378	35.7	
National Front	V. Hopwood	649	16.8	
Conservative	A. Jobson	382	9.9	
Majority		75	1.9	

Blackburn No. 5
Party	Candidate	Votes	%	±%
Conservative	D. Murray	2,613	58.1	
Liberal	D. Adams	1339	29.8	
Labour	M. Dickinson	543	21.2	
Majority		1274	28.3	

Blackburn No. 6
Party	Candidate	Votes	%	±%
Labour	J. Mason	2,056	54.5	
Conservative	A. Hutchinson	1717	45.5	
Majority		339	9.0	

Blackburn No. 7
Party	Candidate	Votes	%	±%
Labour	J. Bury	1,925	41.7	
Conservative	R. Wood	1626	35.3	
National Front	F. Mitton	1061	23.0	
Majority		299	6.5	

Blackburn Rural
Party	Candidate	Votes	%	±%
Conservative	G. Nickson	3,330	62.2	
Liberal	A. Perry	1124	21.0	
Labour	T. Rowe	897	16.8	
Majority		2206	41.2	

Blackpool No. 1
Party	Candidate	Votes	%	±%
Conservative	H. Jackson	2,845	64.3	
Labour	R. Amor	1580	35.7	
Majority		1265	28.6	

Blackpool No. 2
Party	Candidate	Votes	%	±%
Conservative	T. Percival	2,722	55.4	
Labour	T. McKellar	2188	44.6	
Majority		534	10.9	

Blackpool No. 3
Party	Candidate	Votes	%	±%
Conservative	L. Broughton	2,159	52.3	
Liberal	J. Hessey	1068	25.9	
Labour	R. Mills	898	21.8	
Majority		1091	26.4	

Blackpool No. 4
Party	Candidate	Votes	%	±%
Conservative	H. Mitchell	2,091	37.0	
Labour	Taylor I.	1794	31.7	
Liberal	M. Riddle	1767	31.3	
Majority		297	5.3	

Blackpool No. 5
Party	Candidate	Votes	%	±%
Conservative	J. Battersby	2,312	55.4	
Labour	E. Kirton	1859	44.6	
Majority		453	10.9	

Blackpool No. 6
Party	Candidate	Votes	%	±%
Conservative	R. Jacobs	1,342	37.9	
Labour	D. Courtney	1282	36.2	
Liberal	F. Butcher	918	25.9	
Majority		60	1.7	

Blackpool No. 7
Party	Candidate	Votes	%	±%
Conservative	R. Dewhirst	1,968	41.2	
Liberal	M. Barnes	1551	32.5	
Labour	L. Cousins	1257	26.3	
Majority		417	8.7	

Blackpool No. 8
Party	Candidate	Votes	%	±%
Conservative	J. Richardson	2,425	58.0	
Labour	W. Dugdale	1755	42.0	
Majority		670	16.0	

Blackpool No. 9
Party	Candidate	Votes	%	±%
Conservative	J. Cox	2,808	61.0	
Labour	C. Law	1798	39.8	
Majority		1010	21.9	

Blackpool No. 10
Party	Candidate	Votes	%	±%
Independent	E. Wynne	3,643	51.3	
Conservative	J. Walsh	2136	30.1	
Labour	P. Hall	1324	18.6	
Majority		1507	21.2	

Blackpool No. 11
Party	Candidate	Votes	%	±%
Labour	M. Riley	2,368	64.3	
Conservative	F. Lovatt	1315	35.7	
Majority		1053	28.6	

Brierfield
Party	Candidate	Votes	%	±%
Conservative	K. Sumner-Clough	2,890	41.5	
Liberal	K. Highton	2221	31.9	
Labour	R. Rawlinson	1860	26.7	
Majority		669	9.6	

Burnley No. 1
Party	Candidate	Votes	%	±%
Labour	T. Gallagher	2,113	43.6	
Conservative	F. Brown	1684	34.8	
Liberal	J. Hipwell	1049	21.6	
Majority		429	9.6	

Burnley No. 2
Party	Candidate	Votes	%	±%
Labour	W. Roberts	2,059	50.3	
Conservative	S. Blackston	1053	25.7	
Liberal	G. Brownbill	983	24.0	
Majority		1006	24.6	

Burnley No. 3
Party	Candidate	Votes	%	±%
Labour	J. Entwislte	2,450	52.9	
Conservative	M. Durkin	1365	29.5	
Liberal	E. Roberts	818	17.7	
Majority		1085	23.4	

Burnley No. 4
Party	Candidate	Votes	%	±%
Labour	C. Platt	2,877	63.0	
Conservative	M. Tate	1693	37.0	
Majority		1184	25.9	

Burnley No. 5
Party	Candidate	Votes	%	±%
Labour	J. Keller	2,547	58.6	
Conservative	E. Lyle	941	21.6	
Residents	L. Salisbury	859	19.8	
Majority		1606	36.9	

Burnley Rural
Party	Candidate	Votes	%	±%
Conservative	J. Wyld	2,114	65.9	
Labour	J. Bradshaw	1096	34.1	
Majority		1018	31.7	

Chorley North East
Party	Candidate	Votes	%	±%
Labour	D. Dunn	2,188	49.4	
Conservative	M. Beechey	1380	31.2	
Liberal	F. Wilson	861	19.4	
Majority		808	18.2	

Chorley Rural No. 1
Party	Candidate	Votes	%	±%
Labour	J. Meadows	2,866	61.7	
Conservative	J. Marginson	1776	38.3	
Majority		1090	23.5	

Chorley Rural No. 2
Party	Candidate	Votes	%	±%
Conservative	A. Ambrose	2,948	71.8	
Labour	J. Holme	1156	28.2	
Majority		1792	43.7	

Chorley Rural No. 3
Party	Candidate	Votes	%	±%
Conservative	H. Carrington	2,691	48.2	
Labour	C. Sheppard	1741	31.2	
Liberal	C. Felton	1155	20.7	
Majority		950	17.0	

Chorley South West
Party	Candidate	Votes	%	±%
Labour	P. Keane	2,420	43.6	
Conservative	T. Jackson	2194	39.5	
Liberal	E. Power	937	16.9	
Majority		226	4.1	

Clayton-Le-Moors
Party	Candidate	Votes	%	±%
Conservative	P. Galbraith	2,000	50.2	
Labour	F. Parkinson	1983	49.8	
Majority		17	0.4	

Clitheroe
Party	Candidate	Votes	%	±%
Conservative	H. Eastwood	2,075	43.0	
Labour	E. Penny	1378	28.6	
Liberal	J. Aspden	1369	28.4	
Majority		697	14.5	

Colne No. 1
Party	Candidate	Votes	%	±%
Liberal	S. Smithson	1,712	43.0	
Conservative	D. Crabtree	1311	32.9	
Labour	R. Smith	961	24.1	
Majority		401	10.1	

Colne No. 2
Party	Candidate	Votes	%	±%
Liberal	A. Greaves	1,892	49.2	
Labour	E. Turbitt	1119	29.1	
Conservative	A. Seed	833	21.7	
Majority		773	20.1	

Darwen No. 1
Party	Candidate	Votes	%	±%
Liberal	C. Grills	1,767	42.5	
Conservative	C. Halliday	1343	32.3	
Labour	N. Davis	1046	25.2	
Majority		424	10.2	

Darwen No. 2
Party	Candidate	Votes	%	±%
Labour	C. Jones	1,526	44.8	
Conservative	R. Wiggans	1259	37.0	
Liberal	D. Davidson	621	18.2	
Majority		167	7.8	

Darwen No. 3
Party	Candidate	Votes	%	±%
Liberal	A. Bland	1,711	42.3	
Conservative	P. Worth	1359	33.6	
Labour	D. Alder	972	24.0	
Majority		352	8.7	

Fleetwood North
Party	Candidate	Votes	%	±%
Conservative	W. Brown	1,747	54.8	
Labour	W. Potts	1439	45.2	
Majority		308	9.7	

Fleetwood South
Party	Candidate	Votes	%	±%
Conservative	E. Funk	1,655	56.7	
Labour	W. Denny	1262	43.3	
Majority		393	13.5	

Fulwood No. 1
Party	Candidate	Votes	%	±%
Conservative	T. Croft	2,570	78.9	
Labour	R. Tait	689	21.1	
Majority		1881	57.7	

Fulwood No. 2
Party	Candidate	Votes	%	±%
Conservative	M. Horam	2,428	78.2	
Labour	H. Bodfish	678	21.8	
Majority		1750	56.3	

Fylde No. 1
Party	Candidate	Votes	%	±%
Independent	R. Spender	1,907	40.6	
Conservative	P. Hall	1882	40.2	
Labour	H. Garth	903	19.2	
Majority		22	0.5	

Fylde No. 2
Party	Candidate	Votes	%	±%
Conservative	P. Boothman	2,004	50.4	
Liberal	M. Gilbert	1344	33.8	
Labour	P. Greenfield	627	15.8	
Majority		660	16.6	

Garstang No. 1
Party	Candidate	Votes	%	±%
Conservative	D. Elletson	Unopposed		
Majority		N/A	N/A	

Garstang No. 2
Party	Candidate	Votes	%	±%
Conservative	M. Fitzherbert-Brockholes	Unopposed		
Majority		N/A	N/A	

Great Harwood
Party	Candidate	Votes	%	±%
Conservative	F. Worsley	3,410	56.9	
Labour	J. Hocking	2583	34.1	
Majority		827	13.8	

Haslingden
Party	Candidate	Votes	%	±%
Conservative	G. Woodcock	3,120	55.3	
Labour	G. Hatton	2523	44.7	
Majority		597	10.6	

Lancaster No. 1
Party	Candidate	Votes	%	±%
Labour	E. Jones	2,540	53.5	
Conservative	W. Sweeney	1737	36.6	
Independent	E. Gardner	469	9.9	
Majority		803	16.9	

Lancaster No. 2
Party	Candidate	Votes	%	±%
Labour	M. Cantley	2,757	52.0	
Conservative	M. Lovett-Horn	1847	34.9	
Independent	T. Shingler	694	13.1	
Majority		910	17.2	

Lancaster No. 3
Party	Candidate	Votes	%	±%
Conservative	T. Hayton	2,727	58.6	
Labour	J. Wall	1926	41.4	
Majority		801	17.2	

Lancaster Rural No. 1
Party	Candidate	Votes	%	±%
Conservative	M. Bates	2,441	65.1	
Labour	J. Stackhouse	1308	34.9	
Majority		1133	30.2	

Lancaster Rural No. 2
Party	Candidate	Votes	%	±%
Conservative	G. Bowring	3,295	78.1	
Labour	L. Callan	922	21.9	
Majority		2373	56.3	

Lancaster Rural No. 3
Party	Candidate	Votes	%	±%
Conservative	C. Pickard	2,237	70.0	
Labour	J. Yates	957	30.0	
Majority		1280	40.1	

Leyland No. 1
Party	Candidate	Votes	%	±%
Liberal	N. Orrell	1,768	38.1	
Labour	I. Roberts	1662	35.8	
Conservative	G. Eland	1216	26.2	
Majority		106	2.3	

Leyland No. 2
Party	Candidate	Votes	%	±%
Labour	J. Haigh	1,996	64.6	
Liberal	R. Caunce-Peacock	1095	35.4	
Majority		901	29.1	

Longridge
Party	Candidate	Votes	%	±%
Ind. Conservative	D. Coulston	2,680	52.0	
Conservative	B. Greenwood	2470	48.0	
Majority		210	4.1	

Lytham St. Annes No. 1
Party	Candidate	Votes	%	±%
Conservative	J. Gouldbourne	2,710	70.8	
Labour	F. Rooney	1120	29.2	
Majority		1590	41.5	

Lytham St. Annes No. 2
Party	Candidate	Votes	%	±%
Conservative	T. Carter	3,466	74.8	
Labour	N. Horridge	1165	25.2	
Majority		2301	49.7	

Lytham St. Annes No. 3
Party	Candidate	Votes	%	±%
Conservative	J. Finn	4,056	67.3	
Labour	W. Callon	1974	32.7	
Majority		2082	34.5	

Morecambe & Heysham No. 1
Party	Candidate	Votes	%	±%
Conservative	J. Finn	Unopposed		
Majority		N/A	N/A	

Morecambe & Heysham No. 2
Party	Candidate	Votes	%	±%
Conservative	J. Elliott	2,684	52.5	
Labour	D. Stanley	2426	47.5	
Majority		258	5.0	

Morecambe & Heysham No. 3
Party	Candidate	Votes	%	±%
Conservative	R. Quick	Unopposed	N/A	N/A
Majority				

Nelson North
Party	Candidate	Votes	%	±%
Labour	J. Helmn	2,107	49.2	
Liberal	P. Sagar	1326	31.0	
Conservative	M. Sutcliff	851	19.9	
Majority		781	18.2	

Nelson South
Party	Candidate	Votes	%	±%
Labour	N. Taylor	3,168	62.3	
Conservative	J. Fletcher	1918	37.7	
Majority		1250	24.6	

Ormskirk No. 1
Party	Candidate	Votes	%	±%
Conservative	J. Aspinwall	2,860	54.0	
Labour	M. Rees	2438	46.0	
Majority		422	8.0	

Ormskirk No. 2
Party	Candidate	Votes	%	±%
Conservative	H. Ballance	2,371	51.6	
Labour	A. Hibbert	2227	48.4	
Majority		144	3.1	

Oswaldtwistle
Party	Candidate	Votes	%	±%
Conservative	W. Finch	2,233	54.8	
Labour	T. Bramley	1840	45.2	
Majority		393	9.6	

Padiham
Party	Candidate	Votes	%	±%
Labour	K. Broadley	1,987	60.4	
Conservative	D. Hanson	1302	39.6	
Majority		685	20.8	

Poulton-Le-Fylde
Party	Candidate	Votes	%	±%
Conservative	F. Lofthouse	3,914	73.0	
Labour	E. Johnson	1445	27.0	
Majority		2469	46.1	

Preston No. 1
Party	Candidate	Votes	%	±%
Labour	E. Bunker	4,132	54.9	
Labour	H. Riley	3,848		
Conservative	J. Ainscough	3392	45.1	
Conservative	J. Humphreys	3369		
Majority		1219	9.8	

Preston No. 2
Party	Candidate	Votes	%	±%
Liberal	G. Payne	1,646	38.3	
Labour	K. Bodfish	1643	38.2	
Independent	T. Dewhurst	1012	23.5	
Majority		3	0.1	

Preston No. 3
Party	Candidate	Votes	%	±%
Labour	J. Lund	2,532	65.2	
Conservative	K. Peet	1643	34.8	
Majority		889	30.3	

Preston No. 4
Party	Candidate	Votes	%	±%
Labour	H. Parker	4,573	63.5	
Labour	C. Sharples	4,380		
Conservative	R. Ainscough	2631	36.5	
Conservative	R. Ainscough	2546		
Majority		3776	27.0	

Preston No. 5
Party	Candidate	Votes	%	±%
Labour	R. Butcher	2,539	77.4	
Conservative	P. Mileham	742	22.6	
Majority		1797	54.8	

Preston Rural No. 1
Party	Candidate	Votes	%	±%
Conservative	M. Ryan	3,027	74.0	
Labour	T. Yates	1064	26.0	
Majority		1963	48.0	

Preston Rural No. 2
Party	Candidate	Votes	%	±%
Conservative	W. Winn	3,595	65.7	
Labour	M. Lyons	1875	34.3	
Majority		1720	31.4	

Preston Rural No. 3
Party	Candidate	Votes	%	±%
Conservative	A. Ashburner	2,535	46.2	
People Rep	V. Peacock	1817	33.1	
Labour	R. Turton	1138	20.7	
Majority		718	13.1	

Rawtenstall No. 1
Party	Candidate	Votes	%	±%
Labour	I. Bishop	2,455	53.9	
Conservative	H. Ashworth	2099	46.1	
Majority		356	7.8	

Rawtenstall No. 2
Party	Candidate	Votes	%	±%
Conservative	W. Nuttall	1,899	51.0	
Labour	E. Harvey	1828	49.0	
Majority		71	1.9	

Skelmersdale & Holland No. 1
Party	Candidate	Votes	%	±%
Labour	J. Prunty	Unopposed		
Majority				

Skelmersdale & Holland No. 2
Party	Candidate	Votes	%	±%
Labour	L. Ellman	Unopposed		
Majority				

Thornton Cleveleys No. 1
Party	Candidate	Votes	%	±%
Conservative	C. Ashworth	2,504	66.5	
Labour	G. Wright	1264	33.5	
Majority		1240	32.9	

Thornton Cleveleys No. 2
Party	Candidate	Votes	%	±%
Conservative	F. Townend	2,956	69.3	
Labour	A. Davies	1311	30.7	
Majority		1645	38.6	

Walton-Le-Dale No. 1
Party	Candidate	Votes	%	±%
Conservative	R. Welham	2,377	59.9	
Labour	A. White	1591	40.1	
Majority		786	19.8	

Walton-Le-Dale No. 2
Party	Candidate	Votes	%	±%
Conservative	G. Woods	1,566	44.4	
Labour	G. Davies	1524	43.2	
Liberal	J. Bundy	437	12.4	
Majority		42	1.2	

West Lancashire No. 1
Party	Candidate	Votes	%	±%
Conservative	J. Ashton	1,989	76.6	
Labour	I. Coman	608	23.4	
Majority		1381	53.2	

West Lancashire No. 2
Party	Candidate	Votes	%	±%
Conservative	R. Phillips	2,709	72.9	
Labour	M. Cheetham	1008	27.1	
Majority		1701	45.8	

Whitworth
Party	Candidate	Votes	%	±%
Liberal	J. Clegg	1,521	57.1	
Conservative	H. Tenny	1144	42.9	
Majority		377	14.1	
