= 1981 Lancashire County Council election =

1981 English local election

1981 Lancashire County Council Election
- 7 May 1981

All 99 seats on Lancashire County Council 50 seats needed for a majority

	First party	Second party	Third party
Party	Labour	Conservative	Liberal
Last election	12 seats, 28.0 %	83 seats, 61.7 %	1 seat, 6.8 %
Seats after	53	38	6
Seat change	▲41	▼45	▲5
Popular vote	191,885	184,410	42,304
Percentage	44.4 %	42.7 %	9.8 %
Swing	▲16.4 ppt	▼19.0 ppt	▲3.0 ppt
Leader before election
Conservative
Elected Leader
Labour

Elections were held to Lancashire County Council as part of the wider 1981 United Kingdom local elections and under new division boundaries. Any multi-member wards were abolished and each of 99 wards returned one councillor in this election. The election saw a significant Labour recovery from the previous, along with a Conservative fall, leading Labour to gain control of the council for the first time in its history.

== Results ==
1981 Lancashire County Council elections
Party	This election			Full council			This election		
Party	Seats	Net	Seats %	Other	Total	Total %	Votes	Votes %	+/−
Labour	53	▲41	53.5		53	53.5	191,885	44.4	▲16.4
Conservative	38	▼45	38.4		38	38.4	184,410	42.7	▼19.0
Liberal	6	▲5	6.1		6	6.1	42,304	9.8	▲3.0
Residents	2	▲2	2.0		2	2.0	8,347	1.9	▲1.7
Independent	0	Steady	0		0	0	3,824 (Note: Includes alternate independent labels: Independent ratepayers', Independent Social Democrat, Independent conservative.)	0.9	▼0.2
Workers Revolutionary	0	NEW	0		0	0	473	0.1	NEW
Ecology	0	NEW	0		0	0	369	0.1	NEW
SDP	0	NEW	0		0	0	357	0.1	NEW
National Front	0	Steady	0		0	0	109	0.0	▼1.7
Communist	0	Steady	0		0	0	85	0.0	▼2.4

Party	Seats
Labour	53
Conservatives	38
Liberals	6
Residents	2

== Ward results ==
Accrington Central
Party	Candidate	Votes	%
Labour	C. Westall	1,950	66.6
Conservative	W. Parkinson	621	21.2
SDP	J. Pickup	357	12.2
Majority		1,329	45.4
Turnout			
Registered electors			
Labour win (new seat)			

Accrington South
Party	Candidate	Votes	%
Labour	D. Keeley	2,522	61.0
Conservative	M. Martin	1,613	39.0
Majority		909	22.0
Turnout			
Registered electors			
Labour win (new seat)			

Alexandra & Victoria
Party	Candidate	Votes	%
Labour	P. Hall	1,973	57.2
Conservative	K. Hancock	1,476	42.8
Majority		497	14.4
Turnout			
Registered electors			
Labour win (new seat)			

Amounderness
Party	Candidate	Votes	%	±%
Conservative	E. Mallalieu	1,982	53.7	
Labour	W. Jones	1227	33.2	
Liberal	D. Penswick	484	13.1	
Majority		755	20.4	

Anchorsholme & Norbreck
Party	Candidate	Votes	%	±%
Conservative	L. Broughton	2,382	52.1	
Labour	R. Lewis	914	20.0	
Liberal	O. Driver	848	18.6	
Residents	J. Berry	424	9.3	
Majority		1468	32.1	

Bacup
Party	Candidate	Votes	%
Labour	P. Navin	2,471	56.4
Conservative	D. Wood	1,911	43.6
Majority		560	12.8
Turnout			
Registered electors			
Labour win (new boundaries)			

Bank Top & Brookhouse
Party	Candidate	Votes	%
Labour	L. Proos	3,161	84.0
Conservative	D. Harwood	604	16.0
Majority		2557	67.9
Turnout			
Registered electors			
Labour win (new seat)			

Billinge & Revidge
Party	Candidate	Votes	%	±%
Conservative	D. Murray	2,498	67.0	
Labour	S. Harrington	1229	33.0	
Majority		1269	34.0	
Turnout				
Registered electors				
Labour win (new seat)				

Bispham & Ingthorpe
Party	Candidate	Votes	%	±%
Conservative	T. Percival	2,071	46.9	
Labour	D. Wheeldon	1664	37.7	
Liberal	M. Cotton	679	15.4	
Majority		407	9.2	

Brownhill & Pleckgate
Party	Candidate	Votes	%	±%
Labour	M. Higginson	2,071	43.1	
Conservative	T. Marsden	1880	39.2	
Liberal	F. Beetham	850	17.7	
Majority		191	4.0	
Turnout				
Registered electors				
Labour win (new seat)				

Brunswick & Claremont
Party	Candidate	Votes	%	±%
Labour	E. Kirton	2,561	61.6	
Conservative	M. Smith	1596	38.4	
Majority		965	23.2	

Burnley Central East
Party	Candidate	Votes	%	±%
Labour	F. Booth	3,420	76.5	
Conservative	L. Bullock	1051	23.5	
Majority		2369	53.0	

Burnley Central West
Party	Candidate	Votes	%	±%
Labour	J. Maekin	2,938	57.2	
Conservative	M. Tate	2194	42.8	
Majority		744	14.5	

Burnley North East
Party	Candidate	Votes	%	±%
Labour	I. Cooney	2,809	52.5	
Conservative	F. Brown	1514	28.3	
Liberal	J. Davey	1030	19.2	
Majority		1295	24.2	

Burnley Rural
Party	Candidate	Votes	%	±%
Labour	C. Platt	2,469	53.3	
Conservative	J. Wyld	2165	46.7	
Majority		304	6.6	

Burnley South West
Party	Candidate	Votes	%	±%
Labour	J. Keller	2,850	63.9	
Conservative	J. Howarth	781	17.5	
Liberal	S. Parksinson	765	17.1	
Workers Revolutionary	R. Waring	65	1.5	
Majority		2069	46.4	

Burnley West
Party	Candidate	Votes	%	±%
Labour	J. Entwistle	2,883	53.1	
Conservative	J. Brown	2546	46.9	
Majority		337	6.2	

Cathedral & Green Bank
Party	Candidate	Votes	%	±%
Labour	H. White	3,119	83.4	
Conservative	M. Tappenden-Cousins	619	16.6	
Majority		2500	66.9	

Chorley East
Party	Candidate	Votes	%	±%
Labour	D. Yates	2,918	61.2	
Conservative	A. Crompton	1348	28.3	
Liberal	C. Jones	503	10.5	
Majority		1570	32.9	

Chorley North
Party	Candidate	Votes	%	±%
Conservative	J. Glynn	1,777	44.7	
Labour	R. Hubbold	1486	37.4	
Liberal	F. Wilson	708	17.8	
Majority		291	7.3	

Chorley Rural East
Party	Candidate	Votes	%	±%
Conservative	M. Case	2,362	49.3	
Labour	J. Nuttall	1688	35.3	
Liberal	R. Yates	583	12.2	
Ecology	E. Coulston	155	3.2	
Majority		674	14.1	

Chorley Rural North
Party	Candidate	Votes	%	±%
Conservative	A. Ambrose	2,647	54.5	
Labour	F. Higson	1859	38.3	
Independent Ratepayer	G. Butler	348	7.2	
Majority		788	7.2	

Chorley Rural West
Party	Candidate	Votes	%	±%
Conservative	J. Moorcroft	2,734	61.0	
Labour	L. Fishman	1750	39.0	
Majority		984	21.9	

Chorley West
Party	Candidate	Votes	%	±%
Labour	P. Deady	3,704	72.6	
Conservative	S. Freeland	1395	27.4	
Majority		2309	45.3	

Church & Accrington North
Party	Candidate	Votes	%	±%
Labour	L. Dickinson	3,105	62.3	
Conservative	H. Taylor	1879	37.7	
Majority		1226	24.6	

Cleveleys
Party	Candidate	Votes	%	±%
Conservative	F. Townend	2,346	64.9	
Labour	S. Delaney	809	22.4	
Liberal	J. Simpson	460	12.7	
Majority		1537	42.5	

Clifton & Marton
Party	Candidate	Votes	%	±%
Labour	J. Turton	2,401	54.2	
Conservative	J. Metcalf	2029	45.8	
Majority		372	8.4	

Clitheroe
Party	Candidate	Votes	%	±%
Conservative	C. Chatburn	1,780	41.9	
Labour	W. Maunders	1297	30.5	
Liberal	C. Hopwood	1170	27.5	
Majority		483	11.4	

Colne
Party	Candidate	Votes	%	±%
Liberal	A. Greaves	2,739	48.1	
Conservative	A. Fraser	1545	27.2	
Labour	H. Simpson	1406	24.7	
Majority		1194	21.0	

Darwen South & Turton
Party	Candidate	Votes	%	±%
Liberal	C. Grills	2,229	57.4	
Conservative	W. Birch	1654	42.6	
Majority		575	14.8	

Earcroft & West Rural
Party	Candidate	Votes	%	±%
Conservative	A. Bland	1,786	53.8	
Labour	A. Emery	1536	46.2	
Majority		250	7.5	

Ewood & Higher Croft
Party	Candidate	Votes	%	±%
Labour	J. Bury	2,714	78.1	
Conservative	P. Hough	762	21.9	
Majority		1952	56.2	

Foxhall & Talbot
Party	Candidate	Votes	%	±%
Labour	E. Allcock	1,493	46.3	
Conservative	J. Battersby	1301	40.3	
Liberal	C. Penswick	431	13.4	
Majority		192	6.0	

Fylde East
Party	Candidate	Votes	%	±%
Conservative	R. Spencer	2,117	52.4	
Residents	J. Payne	1103	27.3	
Labour	P. Simpson	821	20.3	
Majority		1014	25.1	

Fylde West
Party	Candidate	Votes	%	±%
Conservative	G. Bradley	1,997	57.1	
Independent	G. Bamber	1034	29.6	
Labour	L. Dixon	464	13.3	
Majority		963	27.6	

Garstang
Party	Candidate	Votes	%	±%
Conservative	M. Fitzherbert-Brockholes	2,728	68.9	
Liberal	J. Busby	825	20.8	
Labour	B. Moreland	406	10.3	
Majority		1903	48.1	

Great Harwood
Party	Candidate	Votes	%	±%
Labour	G. Slynn	2,433	56.1	
Conservative	J. Hall	1904	43.9	
Majority		529	12.2	

Greenlands & Warbreck
Party	Candidate	Votes	%	±%
Conservative	R. Jacobs	1,842	45.9	
Liberal	A. Heyworth	1117	27.8	
Labour	J. Readman	951	23.7	
Ecology	M. Palmer	105	2.6	
Majority		725	18.1	

Haslingden
Party	Candidate	Votes	%	±%
Labour	G. Hatton	3,346	54.4	
Conservative	G. Woodcock	2805	45.6	
Majority		541	8.8	

Hawes Side & Tyldesley
Party	Candidate	Votes	%	±%
Labour	J. McCrae	2,090	52.8	
Conservative	H. Hunt	1868	47.2	
Majority		222	5.6	

Hesketh
Party	Candidate	Votes	%	±%
Labour	J. Aspden	2,482	54.1	
Conservative	E. Funk	1412	30.8	
Liberal	J. Rogers	696	15.2	
Majority		1070	23.3	

Heysham
Party	Candidate	Votes	%	±%
Conservative	R. Quick	2,296	43.4	
Labour	A. Garbett	2022	38.3	
Liberal	H. Steel	967	18.3	
Majority		274	5.2	

Highfield & Stanley
Party	Candidate	Votes	%	±%
Labour	F. Jackson	1,907	51.4	
Conservative	G. Heap	1800	48.6	
Majority		107	2.9	

Hillhouse
Party	Candidate	Votes	%	±%
Conservative	C. Ashworth	2,018	48.6	
Labour	W. Goldsmith	1752	42.2	
Liberal	N. Scullion	378	9.1	
Majority		266	6.4	

Lancaster City
Party	Candidate	Votes	%	±%
Labour	R. Clark	2,312	57.6	
Conservative	D. Skyes	1699	42.4	
Majority		613	15.3	

Lancaster East
Party	Candidate	Votes	%	±%
Labour	R. Henig	3,221	69.7	
Conservative	A. Morris	1401	30.3	
Majority		1820	39.4	

Lancaster Rural Central
Party	Candidate	Votes	%	±%
Conservative	W. Brown	2,223	56.4	
Liberal	R. Fenton	1200	30.5	
Labour	S. Robertson	516	13.1	
Majority		1023	26.0	

Lancaster Rural North
Party	Candidate	Votes	%	±%
Conservative	M. Bates	2,266	53.5	
Liberal	P. Wooff	1130	26.7	
Labour	R. Rye	837	19.8	
Majority		1136	26.8	

Lancaster Rural South
Party	Candidate	Votes	%	±%
Conservative	P. Entwistle	2,123	40.5	
Liberal	D. Hardy	1603	30.6	
Labour	J. Yates	1517	28.9	
Majority		1136	26.8	

Layton & Park
Party	Candidate	Votes	%	±%
Labour	S. Wright	2,172	49.0	
Conservative	M. Laye	1451	32.8	
Liberal	B. Morris	697	15.7	
National Front	A. Hanson	109	2.5	
Majority		721	16.3	

Longridge
Party	Candidate	Votes	%	±%
Conservative	D. Coulston	3,080	72.7	
Labour	D. Roebuck	1154	27.3	
Majority		1926	45.5	

Lytham
Party	Candidate	Votes	%	±%
Residents	J. Wilding	1,941	43.8	
Conservative	G. Caldwell	1771	40.0	
Labour	N. Horridge	721	16.3	
Majority		170	3.8	

Marine
Party	Candidate	Votes	%	±%
Labour	N. Walsh	1,974	48.9	
Conservative	K. Storey	1338	33.2	
Ind. Social Democrat	S. Bate	722	17.9	
Majority		636	15.8	

Morecambe East
Party	Candidate	Votes	%	±%
Conservative	G. Robinson	2,833	65.5	
Labour	J. O'Donnell	1492	34.5	
Majority		1341	31.0	

Morecambe West
Party	Candidate	Votes	%	±%
Labour	D. Stanley	2,139	51.9	
Conservative	K. Brook	1985	48.1	
Majority		154	3.7	

Nelson
Party	Candidate	Votes	%	±%
Labour	J. French	3,499	63.4	
Conservative	D. Rigby	1197	21.7	
Liberal	P. Berry	823	14.9	
Majority		2302	41.7	

Ormskirk
Party	Candidate	Votes	%	±%
Conservative	H. Ballance	2,578	53.6	
Labour	A. Williams	2234	46.4	
Majority		344	7.1	

Oswaldtwistle
Party	Candidate	Votes	%	±%
Labour	E. Neville	2,112	47.4	
Conservative	T. Renshaw	1940	43.6	
Independent	I. Marsden	401	9.0	
Majority		172	3.9	

Pendle East
Party	Candidate	Votes	%	±%
Liberal	W. Sargeant	2,004	47.0	
Conservative	W. Blackham	1452	34.0	
Labour	R. Dobney	809	19.0	
Majority		552	12.9	

Pendle South
Party	Candidate	Votes	%	±%
Labour	N. Taylor	3,034	51.3	
Liberal	J. White	1568	26.5	
Conservative	C. Kemp	1314	22.2	
Majority		1466	24.8	

Pendle West
Party	Candidate	Votes	%	±%
Conservative	K. Sumner-Clough	2,407	49.7	
Labour	K. Shore	1675	34.6	
Liberal	D. Hewitt	759	15.7	
Majority		732	15.1	

Poulton-Le-Fylde
Party	Candidate	Votes	%	±%
Conservative	V. Scrine	2,763	58.6	
Labour	M. Wheatley	1242	26.4	
Ind. Conservative	F. Lofthouse	707	15.0	
Majority		1521	32.3	

Preston Central East
Party	Candidate	Votes	%	±%
Labour	D. Nelson	3,374	72.0	
Conservative	G. Wilkins	1311	28.0	
Majority		2063	44.0	

Preston Central West
Party	Candidate	Votes	%	±%
Labour	I. Short	2,081	44.0	
Conservative	J. McGrath	2063	43.6	
Liberal	J. Hanney	585	12.4	
Majority		18	0.4	

Preston East
Party	Candidate	Votes	%	±%
Labour	J. Farrington	3,558	76.7	
Conservative	P. Worrall	1079	23.3	
Majority		2479	53.5	

Preston North
Party	Candidate	Votes	%	±%
Conservative	M. Horam	2,473	62.0	
Liberal	B. Moore	872	21.9	
Labour	A. Richardson	643	16.1	
Majority		1601	40.1	

Preston Rural East
Party	Candidate	Votes	%	±%
Conservative	T. Croft	3,441	75.6	
Labour	Oldcorn H.	1108	24.4	
Majority		2333	51.3	

Preston Rural West
Party	Candidate	Votes	%	±%
Conservative	P. Clegg	2,066	48.1	
Labour	H. Parker	1149	26.8	
Liberal	J. Wright	1078	25.1	
Majority		917	21.4	

Preston South
Party	Candidate	Votes	%	±%
Labour	J. Wegg	3,216	75.3	
Conservative	J. Bosson	910	21.3	
Workers Revolutionary	V. Stephens	146	3.4	
Majority		2306	54.0	

Preston South West
Party	Candidate	Votes	%	±%
Labour	F. McGrath	2,948	62.0	
Conservative	E. Kerr	1016	21.4	
Liberal	P. Hulse	794	16.7	
Majority		1932	40.6	

Preston West
Party	Candidate	Votes	%	±%
Labour	G. Higney	2,329	48.1	
Conservative	A. Scarsbrook	1729	35.7	
Liberal	A. Carmichael	786	16.2	
Majority		600	12.4	

Queens Park & Shadsworth
Party	Candidate	Votes	%	±%
Labour	E. Smith	2,439	70.6	
Liberal	H. Dickinson	531	15.4	
Conservative	A. Salmon	485	14.0	
Majority		1908	55.2	

Ribble Valley North East
Party	Candidate	Votes	%	±%
Conservative	J. Watson	3,163	74.4	
Labour	A. Barton	1090	25.6	
Majority		2073	48.7	

Ribble Valley South West
Party	Candidate	Votes	%	±%
Conservative	G. Nickson	2,413	68.0	
Labour	D. Alber	589	16.6	
Independent	F. Ellis	546	15.4	
Majority		1824	51.4	

Rishton Clayton Altham
Party	Candidate	Votes	%	±%
Labour	S. Mercer	2,351	50.1	
Conservative	P. Galbraith	2341	49.9	
Majority		10	0.2	

Rossendale East
Party	Candidate	Votes	%	±%
Labour	P. Coward	2,340	54.9	
Conservative	A. King	1919	45.1	
Majority		421	9.9	

Rossendale West
Party	Candidate	Votes	%	±%
Labour	G. Bland	2,938	56.9	
Conservative	M. Ingham	2227	43.1	
Majority		711	13.8	

Skelmersdale Central
Party	Candidate	Votes	%	±%
Labour	L. Ellman	2,556	90.7	
Workers Revolutionary	J. Simons	262	9.3	
Majority		2294	81.4	

Skelmersdale East
Party	Candidate	Votes	%	±%
Labour	J. Prunty	2,709	59.5	
Conservative	T. Baxter	1761	38.7	
Communist	T. Aldridge	85	1.9	
Majority		948	20.8	

Skelmersdale West
Party	Candidate	Votes	%	±%
Labour	C. Cheetham	2,690	81.8	
Conservative	S. Huyton	598	18.2	
Majority		2092	63.6	

Skerton
Party	Candidate	Votes	%	±%
Labour	E. Jones	3,271	68.1	
Conservative	J. Taylor	1531	31.9	
Majority		1740	36.2	

South Ribble Central
Party	Candidate	Votes	%	±%
Labour	M. Lyons	1,854	54.2	
Conservative	R. Charnley	1568	45.8	
Majority		286	8.4	

South Ribble East
Party	Candidate	Votes	%	±%
Labour	T. Sharratt	2,029	53.3	
Conservative	R. Welham	1781	46.7	
Majority		248	6.5	

South Ribble North
Party	Candidate	Votes	%	±%
Labour	G. Davies	2,501	52.8	
Conservative	G. Woods	2232	47.2	
Majority		269	5.7	

South Ribble North West
Party	Candidate	Votes	%	±%
Conservative	W. Winn	2,987	68.7	
Labour	D. King	1359	31.3	
Majority		1628	37.5	

South Ribble South
Party	Candidate	Votes	%	±%
Liberal	N. Orrell	2,438	46.6	
Labour	L. Day	1467	28.0	
Conservative	W. Jackson	1263	24.1	
Independent	W. Lamb	66	1.3	
Majority		971	18.6	

South Ribble South
Party	Candidate	Votes	%	±%
Liberal	N. Orrell	2,438	46.6	
Labour	L. Day	1467	28.0	
Conservative	W. Jackson	1263	24.1	
Independent	W. Lamb	66	1.3	
Majority		971	18.6	

South Ribble South West
Party	Candidate	Votes	%	±%
Labour	J. Haigh	3,448	67.2	
Conservative	R. Smith	891	17.4	
Liberal	D. Golden	795	15.5	
Majority		2557	58.9	

South Ribble West
Party	Candidate	Votes	%	±%
Conservative	J. Jenksinson	2,080	59.3	
Liberal	M. Roper	982	28.0	
Labour	G. Nicholson	446	12.7	
Majority		1098	31.3	

Squires Gate & Waterloo
Party	Candidate	Votes	%	±%
Conservative	D. Hanson	2,191	65.6	
Labour	G. Cotton	1147	34.4	
Majority		1044	31.3	

St Annes North
Party	Candidate	Votes	%	±%
Residents	J. Lane	2,897	58.1	
Conservative	J. Gouldbourn	1565	31.4	
Labour	A. Calder	333	6.7	
Ecology	G. Dawson	109	2.2	
National Front	W. Smith	80	1.6	
Majority		1332	26.7	

St Annes South
Party	Candidate	Votes	%	±%
Conservative	T. Carter	2,003	44.6	
Residents	J. Parkinson	1982	44.1	
Labour	B. Cowap	506	11.3	
Majority		31	0.5	

Sudell & Sunnyhurst
Party	Candidate	Votes	%	±%
Liberal	P. Browne	1,719	44.3	
Labour	G. Toole	1267	33.4	
Conservative	R. Wood	808	21.3	
Majority		452	11.9	

West Craven
Party	Candidate	Votes	%	±%
Liberal	D. Whipp	2,904	42.4	
Conservative	J. Maisey	2137	31.2	
Labour	R. Macsween	1813	26.5	
Majority		767	11.2	

West Lancashire East
Party	Candidate	Votes	%	±%
Conservative	J. Aspinwall	3,165	62.7	
Labour	R. Lennon	1881	37.3	
Majority		1284	25.4	

West Lancashire North
Party	Candidate	Votes	%	±%
Conservative	S. Taylor	2,899	73.1	
Labour	P. Wynn	1066	26.9	
Majority		1833	46.2	

West Lancashire South
Party	Candidate	Votes	%	±%
Conservative	R. Kirby	2,889	77.6	
Labour	B. Brown	833	22.4	
Majority		2056	55.2	

Whitworth
Party	Candidate	Votes	%	±%
Labour	E. Kershaw	2,120	51.5	
Conservative	M. Crabtree	1998	48.5	
Majority		122	3.0	

Wyre Side
Party	Candidate	Votes	%	±%
Conservative	D. Elletson	2,523	56.1	
Liberal	L. Moat	1574	35.0	
Labour	H. Brooke	401	8.9	
Majority		949	21.1	
