= South Ribble Borough Council elections =

Class of election in the United Kingdom

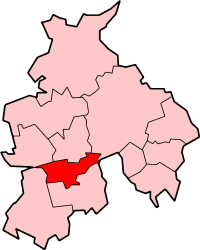
South Ribble shown within the non-metropolitan county of Lancashire (Unitary authorities excluded)

South Ribble Borough Council elections are held every four years. South Ribble Borough Council is the local authority for the non-metropolitan district of South Ribble in Lancashire, England. Since the last boundary changes in 2015, 50 councillors have been elected from 23 wards. The next borough council elections are due to take place in 2027 as part of the wider 2027 United Kingdom local elections.

== Council elections ==
- 1973 South Ribble Borough Council election
- 1976 South Ribble Borough Council election (New ward boundaries)
- 1979 South Ribble Borough Council election
- 1983 South Ribble Borough Council election
- 1987 South Ribble Borough Council election (New ward boundaries & borough boundary changes also took place)
- 1991 South Ribble Borough Council election
- 1995 South Ribble Borough Council election
- 1999 South Ribble Borough Council election
- 2003 South Ribble Borough Council election (New ward boundaries increased the number of seats by 1)
- 2007 South Ribble Borough Council election
- 2011 South Ribble Borough Council election
- 2015 South Ribble Borough Council election (New ward boundaries)
- 2019 South Ribble Borough Council election
- 2023 South Ribble Borough Council election

== Election results ==
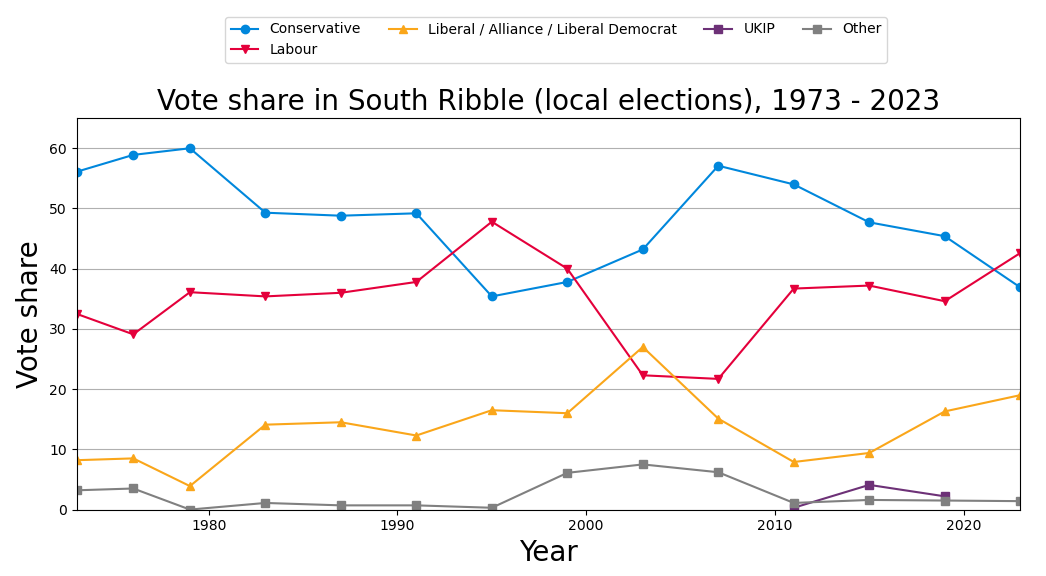
South Ribble Borough Council election results

=== Council composition ===
	Overall control	Conservative	Labour	Lib Dems (Note: Includes Alliance and Liberal Party.)	Idle Toad	Independents
2023	Labour	16	29	5	-	-
2019	NOC	23	22	5	-	0
2015	Conservative	29	19	2	-	-
2011	Conservative	33	21	1	-	-
2007	Conservative	44	8	1	2	0
2003	NOC	19	17	15	4	0
1999	NOC	18	21	12	-	3
1995	Labour	16	29	9	-	-
1991	Conservative	33	15	6	-	0
1987	Conservative	37	11	6	-	0
1983	Conservative	39	11	4	-	0
1979	Conservative	42	10	1	-	1
1976	Conservative	45	8	0	-	1
1973	Conservative	30	16	2	-	1

== Borough result maps ==
2003 results map

2007 results map

2011 results map

2015 results map

2019 results map

2023 results map

== By-election results ==
=== 1995-1999 ===
Farington By-Election 1 May 1997
Party	Candidate	Votes	%	±%
Labour		1,600	45.2	−0.1
Conservative		1,334	37.7	+2.6
Liberal Democrats		608	17.2	−2.4
Majority		266	7.5	
Turnout		3,542		
Labour hold		Swing		

Longton Central and West By-Election 4 December 1997
Party	Candidate	Votes	%	±%
Conservative		507	57.5	+15.8
Labour		260	29.5	−5.0
Liberal Democrats		115	13.0	−10.5
Majority		247	28.0	
Turnout		882	22.5	
Conservative hold		Swing		

Bamber Bridge South By-Election 19 March 1998
Party	Candidate	Votes	%	±%
Labour		398	47.6	−17.3'
Conservative		267	31.9	+7.0
Idle Toad		98	11.7	+11.7
Liberal Democrats		74	8.8	−1.4
Majority		131	15.7	
Turnout		837	20.0	
Labour hold		Swing		

=== 1999-2003 ===
Priory By-Election 22 November 2001
Party	Candidate	Votes	%	±%
Conservative		356	42.2	−10.3
Liberal Democrats		323	38.3	+20.2
Labour		165	19.5	−9.9
Majority		33	3.9	
Turnout		844		
Conservative hold		Swing		

Farington By-Election 22 November 2001
Party	Candidate	Votes	%	±%
Labour		347	65.7	−12.3
Liberal Democrats		121	22.9	+22.9
Conservative		60	11.4	−10.6
Majority		226	42.8	
Turnout		528		
Labour hold		Swing		

Leyland St Mary's By-Election 17 October 2002
Party	Candidate	Votes	%	±%
Liberal Democrats		823	70.6	+30.2
Labour		342	29.4	−7.8
Majority		481	41.2	
Turnout		1,165	24.8	
Liberal Democrats gain from Labour		Swing		

=== 2003-2007 ===
Walton Le Dale By-Election 30 October 2003
Party	Candidate	Votes	%	±%
Liberal Democrats	Christine Leeming	316	41.1	+41.1
Conservative	John Cannon	283	36.8	−26.1
Labour	Graham Davies	92	12.0	−25.1
Idle Toad	Michael Nathan	78	10.1	+10.1
Majority		33	4.3	
Turnout		769	25.0	
Liberal Democrats gain from Conservative		Swing		

Leyland St Ambrose By-Election 29 April 2004
Party	Candidate	Votes	%	±%
Liberal Democrats	James Leeming	406	49.4	−18.7
Conservative	Frances Thompson	264	32.1	+22.8
Labour	Donald Smith	152	18.5	−4.1
Majority		142	17.3	
Turnout		822	32.2	
Liberal Democrats hold		Swing		

Leyland St Mary's By-Election 29 April 2004
Party	Candidate	Votes	%	±%
Conservative	Michael McNulty	594	51.5	+11.5
Liberal Democrats	Richard Bridge	431	37.4	−6.4
Labour	Michaek Titherington	128	11.1	−5.1
Majority		163	14.1	
Turnout		1,153	40.0	
Conservative gain from Liberal Democrats		Swing		

Coupe Green & Gregson Lane By-Election 14 October 2004
Party	Candidate	Votes	%	±%
Idle Toad	James Marsh	364	44.0	−16.4
Conservative	Frances Walker	349	42.1	+10.1
Labour	Houston Lowe	91	11.0	+3.4
Liberal Democrats	Karen Cairns	24	2.9	+2.9
Majority		15	1.9	
Turnout		828	28.6	
Idle Toad hold		Swing		

Golden Hill By-Election 5 May 2005
Party	Candidate	Votes	%	±%
Labour	Michael Titherington	1,051	61.2	+7.6
Liberal Democrats	Richard Bridge	342	20.0	−7.7
Conservative	John Otter	323	18.8	+0.1
Majority		709	41.2	
Turnout		1,716		
Labour hold		Swing		

=== 2007-2011 ===
Leyland Central By-Election 4 June 2009
Party	Candidate	Votes	%	±%
Labour	Caleb Tomlinson	371	34.5	+1.1
Conservative	Phillip Hamman	355	33.0	−7.6
Liberal Democrats	Derek Forrest	350	32.5	+6.5
Majority		16	1.5	
Turnout		1,076		
Labour gain from Conservative		Swing		

Walton-le-dale By-election 4 June 2009
Party	Candidate	Votes	%	±%
Conservative	Michael Nelson	531	54.3	−21.7
Labour	Daniel McDermott	241	24.6	+24.6
Liberal Democrats	Martin Cassell	206	21.1	−3.0
Majority		290	29.7	
Turnout		978		
Conservative hold		Swing		

Leyland St Mary's By-election 15 October 2009
Party	Candidate	Votes	%	±%
Conservative	Philip Hamman	709	'74.9	+6.3
Labour	Peter Holker	237	25.1	+6.1
Majority		472	49.8	
Turnout		946		
Conservative hold		Swing		

=== 2011-2015 ===
Bamber Bridge East By-election 13 October 2011
Party	Candidate	Votes	%	±%
Labour	Mick Higgins	481	55.0	−2.4
Conservative	Barbara Nathan	393	45.0	+2.4
Majority		88	10.1	
Turnout		874	23.4	
Labour hold		Swing		

Howick and Priory By-election 2 May 2013
Party	Candidate	Votes	%	±%
Liberal Democrats	David Howarth	469	39.0	+7.2
Conservative	Angela Turner	390	32.4	−12.8
Labour	Robert Taylor	185	15.4	−7.6
UKIP	David Duxbury	159	13.2	+13.2
Majority		79	6.6	
Turnout		1,203		
Liberal Democrats gain from Conservative		Swing		

Leyland St Ambrose By-election 2 May 2013
Party	Candidate	Votes	%	±%
Labour	Ken Jones	534	48.4	+0.2
Conservative	Paul Wharton	440	39.9	−3.2
Liberal Democrats	Gareth Armstrong	129	11.7	+3.0
Majority		94	8.5	
Turnout		1,103		
Labour hold		Swing		

Leyland St Mary's By-election 2 May 2013
Party	Candidate	Votes	%	±%
Conservative	Alan Ogilvie	744	60.0	−6.8
Labour	Carole Titherington	401	32.3	−0.9
Liberal Democrats	Charlotte Ashworth	95	7.7	+7.7
Majority		343	27.7	
Turnout		1,240		
Conservative hold		Swing		

=== 2015-2019 ===
Seven Stars By-election 5 May 2016
Party	Candidate	Votes	%	±%
Labour	Malcolm Donoghue	625	55.2	−3.0
Conservative	Anthony Green	405	35.8	+6.0
Liberal Democrats	James Pattison	102	9.0	+9.0
Majority		220	19.4	
Turnout		1,132		
Labour hold		Swing		

Walton-le-Dale East By-election 16 March 2017
Party	Candidate	Votes	%	±%
Conservative	Carol Chisholm	359	49.4	−5.1
Labour	Alex Watson	262	36.0	−9.5
Liberal Democrats	Alison Hesketh-Holt	106	14.6	+14.6
Majority		97	13.3	
Turnout		727		
Conservative hold		Swing		

=== 2019-2023 ===
Coupe Green and Gregson Lane By-election 24 October 2019
Party	Candidate	Votes	%	±%
Conservative	Gareth Watson	437	49.1	−0.8
Independent	Graham Dixon	343	38.5	+38.5
Liberal Democrats	Stephanie Portersmith	110	12.4	+12.4
Majority		94	10.6	
Turnout		890		
Conservative hold		Swing		

Longton and Hutton West By-election 6 May 2021
Party	Candidate	Votes	%	±%
Conservative	Julie Buttery	1,301	67.2	+15.4
Labour	Amy Dwyer	353	18.2	+0.6
Liberal Democrats	Simon Carter	151	7.8	−10.2
Reform	Jonathan Kay	70	3.6	+3.6
Green	Heike McMurray	61	3.2	+3.2
Majority		948	49.0	
Turnout		1,936		
Conservative hold		Swing		

St Ambrose By-election 6 May 2021
Party	Candidate	Votes	%	±%
Labour	Kath Unsworth	517	44.4	−16.8
Conservative	Andrew Ashton	398	34.2	+12.3
Liberal Democrats	Paul Valentine	249	21.4	+4.4
Majority		119	10.2	
Turnout		1,164		
Labour hold		Swing		

Bamber Bridge East By-election 18 November 2021
Party	Candidate	Votes	%	±%
Labour	Patricia Hunter	376	53.7	+7.1
Conservative	Matthew Forshaw	275	39.3	+9.5
Green	Rachel Knowles	49	7.0	+7.0
Majority		101	14.4	
Turnout		700		
Labour hold		Swing		

Earnshaw Bridge By-election 5 May 2022
Party	Candidate	Votes	%	±%
Labour	Lou Jackson	626	53.4	+8.9
Conservative	Craige Southern	460	39.2	−2.0
Liberal Democrats	Simon Thomson	86	7.3	−7.0
Majority		166	14.2	
Turnout		1,172		
Labour hold		Swing		

=== 2023-2027 ===
Bamber Bridge West By-election 10 October 2024
Party	Candidate	Votes	%	±%
Labour	David Bollenberg	253	44.8	
Conservative	Stephen Bridge	186	32.9	
Liberal Democrats	Paul Valentine	126	22.3	
Majority		67	11.9	
Turnout		565		
Labour hold		Swing		

Middleforth By-election 24 October 2024
Party	Candidate	Votes	%	±%
Conservative	Joan Burrows	517	46.3	
Labour	Laura Crawford-Lane	362	32.4	
Liberal Democrats	Clare Burton-Johnson	173	15.5	
Green	Ann Moorby	64	5.7	
Majority		155	13.9	
Turnout		1,116		
Conservative gain from Labour		Swing		

Broad Oak By-election 18 December 2025
Party	Candidate	Votes	%	±%
Liberal Democrats	Clare Burton-Johnson	810	65.9	
Reform	Lee Forshaw	263	21.4	
Conservative	Gareth Watson	95	7.7	
Labour	Andy Rae	62	5.0	
Majority		547	44.5	
Turnout		1,230		
Liberal Democrats hold		Swing		
