= 2011 South Ribble Borough Council election =

2011 UK local government election

Map of the results of the 2011 South Ribble Borough Council election. Conservatives in blue, Labour in red and Liberal Democrats in yellow.

Local elections were held for South Ribble Borough Council on 5 May 2011. Local elections are held every four years with all councillors up for election in multi-member electoral wards.

The Local Government Boundary Commission for England reviewed the electoral wards of South Ribble Borough Council in 2014 with the new electoral map to be elected for the first time at the 2015 South Ribble Borough Council election.

== Ward results ==
South Ribble Council Elections: Bamber Bridge East (2 members)
Party	Candidate	Votes	%	±%
Labour	James Owen	695		
Labour	David J Watts	643		
Conservative	Peter Barlow	516		
Conservative	Barbara Nathan	491		

South Ribble Council Elections: Bamber Bridge North (2 members)
Party	Candidate	Votes	%	±%
Conservative	Andrea Ball	668		
Labour	Stephen Bennett	600		
Conservative	Michael Nathan	549		
Labour	John Higgins	521		

South Ribble Council Elections: Bamber Bridge West (2 members)
Party	Candidate	Votes	%	±%
Labour	Paul Foster	604		
Labour	Thomas Hanson	603		
Conservative	James Davies	476		
Conservative	Ann Pearman	436		

South Ribble Council Elections: Broad Oak (2 members)
Party	Candidate	Votes	%	±%
Conservative	Linda Woollard	703		
Conservative	Frances Walker	656		
Liberal Democrats	Harold Hancock	626		
Liberal Democrats	David Howarth	601		
Labour	Elizabeth Mawson	372		

South Ribble Council Elections: Charnock (2 members)
Party	Candidate	Votes	%	±%
Conservative	Dorothy A Gardner	575		
Conservative	Melvyn Gardner	527		
Labour	David Bretherton	498		
Labour	Gaynor Bretherton	485		

South Ribble Council Elections: Coupe Green and Gregson Lane (2 members)
Party	Candidate	Votes	%	±%
Conservative	Jim Marsh	826		
Conservative	Warren Bennett	757		
Idle Toad	Tom Sharratt	619		

South Ribble Council Elections: Earnshaw Bridge (2 members)
Party	Candidate	Votes	%	±%
Labour	Jane Bell	563		
Labour	William Evans	518		
Conservative	Peter Aspinall	487		
Conservative	Graham Gooch	390		

South Ribble Council Elections: Farington East (2 members)
Party	Candidate	Votes	%	±%
Conservative	John Otter	443		
Labour	Mark Bradley	388		
Labour	John Mackey	354		
Conservative	Alan Pearman	354		
Liberal Democrats	Martin Cassell	72		
Liberal Democrats	David Shaw	45		

South Ribble Council Elections: Farington West (2 members)
Party	Candidate	Votes	%	±%
Conservative	Joseph Walton	697		
Conservative	John Rainsbury	597		
Labour	Cheryl Ledward-Lee	465		
Labour	Lucie-May Christoforou	433		
Green	David Williams	107		
Liberal Democrats	Geoffery Garratt	102		
Liberal Democrats	Lynne Watson	84		

South Ribble Council Elections: Golden Hill (2 members)
Party	Candidate	Votes	%	±%
Labour	Matthew Tomlinson	800		
Labour	Michael Titherington	795		
Conservative	Mary Shuttleworth	361		
Conservative	Mike Shuttleworth	339		

South Ribble Council Elections: Howick and Priory (2 members)
Party	Candidate	Votes	%	±%
Conservative	Mary Robinson	727		
Conservative	Stephen Robinson	675		
Liberal Democrats	Leonard Read	512		
Liberal Democrats	Geoffrey Crewe	408		
Labour	Robert Taylor	371		

South Ribble Council Elections: Kingsfold (2 members)
Party	Candidate	Votes	%	±%
Labour	Keith Martin	545		
Labour	James Patten	531		
Conservative	Renee Blow	459		
Conservative	Jim Gray	408		
Liberal Democrats	Marion Hancock	116		
Liberal Democrats	Matthew Howarth	101		

South Ribble Council Elections: Leyland Central (2 members)
Party	Candidate	Votes	%	±%
Labour	Caleb Tomlinson	604		
Labour	Derek Forrest	602		
Conservative	Rod Clarke	358		
Conservative	Stuart Hopwood	337		
Liberal Democrats	Marie Garratt	76		
Liberal Democrats	Anthony Hartley	63		

South Ribble Council Elections: Leyland St Ambrose (2 members)
Party	Candidate	Votes	%	±%
Labour	Susan Jones	580		
Labour	Sarah Tomlinson	571		
Conservative	David Caunce	518		
Conservative	Pam Guy	493		
Liberal Democrats	Doris Pimblett	105		
Liberal Democrats	Mary Young	100		

South Ribble Council Elections: Leyland St Marys (2 members)
Party	Candidate	Votes	%	±%
Conservative	Michael McNulty	907		
Conservative	Phil Hamman	888		
Labour	David Wynn	450		
Labour	Peter Holker	427		

South Ribble Council Elections: Little Hoole and Much Hoole (2 members)
Party	Candidate	Votes	%	±%
Conservative	David Suthers	898		
Conservative	Peter Stettner	716		
Labour	Neil Scanlan	393		

South Ribble Council Elections: Longton and Hutton West (3 members)
Party	Candidate	Votes	%	±%
Conservative	Colin Clark	1,322		
Conservative	Colin Coulton	1,298		
Conservative	Jon Hesketh	1,252		
Labour	Carol Wooldridge	484		
Labour	David Wooldridge	453		
Liberal Democrats	David Moore	237		
Liberal Democrats	Mary Moore	232		
Liberal Democrats	Julie Hartley	187		

South Ribble Council Elections: Lostock Hall (2 members)
Party	Candidate	Votes	%	±%
Labour	Cameron Crook	488		
Conservative	Kath Beattie	471		
Labour	Mark Johnstone	426		
Conservative	Don Parkinson	406		
Liberal Democrats	Helen Crewe	67		
Liberal Democrats	Jeremy Barker	64		

South Ribble Council Elections: Lowerhouse (2 members)
Party	Candidate	Votes	%	±%
Labour	Fred Heyworth	654		
Labour	Tony Kelly	620		
Conservative	Jan Hamman	411		
Conservative	Pete Wearden	348		

South Ribble Council Elections: Middleforth (2 members)
Party	Candidate	Votes	%	±%
Conservative	Jenny Hothersall	547		
Labour	Susan Prynn	553		
Labour	Ian Watkinson	526		
Conservative	Jim Hothersall	524		

South Ribble Council Elections: Moss Side (2 members)
Party	Candidate	Votes	%	±%
Conservative	Michael Green	706		
Conservative	Mary Green	694		
Labour	Anne Brown	455		
Labour	James Minall	381		

South Ribble Council Elections: New Longton and Hutton East (2 members)
Party	Candidate	Votes	%	±%
Conservative	Margaret Smith	1,172		
Conservative	Phil Smith	1,005		
Labour	Josh Gibson	599		

South Ribble Council Elections: Samlesbury and Walton (2 members)
Party	Candidate	Votes	%	±%
Conservative	Barrie Yates	858		
Conservative	Peter Mullineaux	823		
Labour	Christine Watts	409		
Labour	Bradley Crook	391		

South Ribble Council Elections: Seven Stars (2 members)
Party	Candidate	Votes	%	±%
Conservative	Caroline Moon	485		
Labour	Donald Harrison	425		
Conservative	Alan Ogilvie	413		
Labour	Peter Louis McClelland	362		
UKIP	David Duxbury	179		

South Ribble Council Elections: Tardy Gate (2 members)
Party	Candidate	Votes	%	±%
Conservative	Cliff Hughes	673		
Conservative	Jacqui Mort	604		
Labour	David Flanagan	358		
Labour	Michael Denoual	334		
Liberal Democrats	Judith Davidson	88		
Liberal Democrats	Alexander Howarth	68		

South Ribble Council Elections: Walton-le-Dale (2 members)
Party	Candidate	Votes	%	±%
Conservative	Graham O'Hare	601		
Conservative	Mike Nelson	540		
Labour	Graham Davies	491		
Labour	Kenneth Jones	363		

South Ribble Council Elections: Whitefield (2 members)
Party	Candidate	Votes	%	±%
Conservative	Rebecca Noblet	677		
Liberal Democrats	Anthony Pimblett	644		
Conservative	Julie Buttery	614		
Liberal Democrats	Timothy Young	450		
Labour	Geoffrey Key	345		

== See also ==
- South Ribble
