= 1983 South Ribble Borough Council election =

Elections to South Ribble Borough Council were held on 5 May 1983. The whole council was up for election and the Conservative Party retained its majority. The elections were the last to be held under the old boundaries, with new boundaries for the borough council and its wards coming into effect for the 1987 Borough Council elections.

Composition of the Borough Council after the 1983 election

== Election result ==
South Ribble local election result 1983
Party	Seats	Gains	Losses	Net gain/loss	Seats %	Votes %	Votes	+/−
Conservative	39			▼3	72.2	49.3	41,274	
Labour	11			▲1	20.4	35.4	29,698	
Alliance	4			▲3	7.4	14.1	11,850	
Independent	0			▼1	0.0	1.1	958	

== Ward results ==
All Saints
Party	Candidate	Votes	%	±%
Conservative	M. Rhodes	1,190	19.7	
Conservative	P. Young	1,081	17.9	
Conservative	T. Huntriss	1,104	17.0	
Labour	G. Dixon	803	13.3	
Labour	L. Parker	669	11.1	
Labour	D. Lamb	572	9.5	
Alliance	L. Parkins	412	6.8	
Alliance	P. Gaskill	296	4.9	

Bamber Bridge Central
Party	Candidate	Votes	%	±%
Conservative	F. Cooper	1,206	19.3	
Conservative	G. Woods	1,175	18.8	
Conservative	T. Dixon	1,154	18.5	
Labour	G. Davies	969	15.5	
Labour	C. Rooke	893	14.3	
Labour	P. McDonnell	854	13.7	

Charnock
Party	Candidate	Votes	%	±%
Labour	J. Bennett	331	53.0	
Conservative	R. Ainscough	293	47.0	

Farington
Party	Candidate	Votes	%	±%
Conservative	G. Thorpe	1,018	20.7	
Conservative	L. Craven	1,009	20.5	
Conservative	C. Elliott	989	20.1	
Labour	N. Ward	554	11.3	
Labour	B. Gilfoyle	541	11.0	
Labour	C. Rigby	491	10.0	
Alliance	B. Lawrenson	317	6.4	

Howick
Party	Candidate	Votes	%	±%
Conservative	D. Stewart	813	33.4	
Conservative	R. Smith	770	31.6	
Labour	N. Ward	554	11.3	
Alliance	A. Grant	267	11.0	
Alliance	C. Evans	266	10.9	
Labour	S. Crookes	165	6.8	
Labour	D. Wooldridge	156	6.4	

Hutton & New Longton
Party	Candidate	Votes	%	±%
Conservative	J. Hesketh	1,237	25.3	
Conservative	R. Hawkins	1,221	25.0	
Conservative	A. Underwood	1,102	22.5	
Independent	P. Wearden	589	12.0	
Labour	F. Marshall	260	5.3	
Labour	K. Shaw	251	5.1	
Labour	N. House	230	4.7	

Kingsfold
Party	Candidate	Votes	%	±%
Conservative	A. Bannister	890	17.4	
Conservative	E. Carson	880	17.2	
Conservative	J. Jenkinson	870	17.0	
Labour	M. Lyons	793	15.5	
Labour	D. King	681	13.3	
Labour	H. Jones	673	13.1	
Alliance	R. Owen	335	6.5	

Little Hoole & Much Hoole
Party	Candidate	Votes	%	±%
Conservative	J. Knowles	450	31.8	
Conservative	E. Webster	442	31.2	
Labour	M. Lyons	793	15.5	
Independent	G. Lewis	369	26.0	
Labour	C. Hamer	82	5.8	
Labour	A. Brown	72	5.1	

Longton Central & West
Party	Candidate	Votes	%	±%
Conservative	A. Burdon	1,195	21.3	
Conservative	M. Nicholls	1,112	19.8	
Conservative	J. Breakell	1,109	19.8	
Alliance	T. Yates	406	7.2	
Alliance	S. Austen	362	6.4	
Labour	G. Nicholson	226	4.0	
Labour	C. Bennett	214	3.8	
Labour	A. Nicholson	190	3.4	

Manor
Party	Candidate	Votes	%	±%
Conservative	M. Barker	878	30.0	
Conservative	J. Thompson	849	29.0	
Alliance	C. Hayes	377	12.9	
Alliance	A. Hollerman	344	11.7	
Labour	A. Needham	246	8.4	
Labour	F. Stansfield	234	8.0	

Middleford Green
Party	Candidate	Votes	%	±%
Conservative	K. Dickenson	829	29.8	
Conservative	R. Harwood	646	23.2	
Labour	M. Clegg	451	16.2	
Labour	R. Miller	413	14.8	
Alliance	J. Webb	252	9.0	
Alliance	R. Whiteley	194	5.9	

Moss Side
Party	Candidate	Votes	%	±%
Labour	R. Quinn	802	56.7	
Conservative	R. Smith	612	43.3	

Priory
Party	Candidate	Votes	%	±%
Conservative	R. Haworth	806	35.6	
Conservative	S. Allinson	710	31.4	
Alliance	L. Farrer	390	17.2	
Labour	J. Nettleship	191	8.4	
Labour	T. McEvoy	164	7.3	

Samlesbury & Cuerdale
Party	Candidate	Votes	%	±%
Conservative	F. Barton	322	76.3	
Alliance	S. Hallett	390	16.6	
Labour	J. Stott	30	7.1	

Seven Stars
Party	Candidate	Votes	%	±%
Labour	C. Dawber	1,011	31.1	
Labour	A. Kelly	899	27.6	
Labour	C. Croft	861	26.5	
Conservative	B. Gadd	482	14.8	

St. Ambrose Wesley
Party	Candidate	Votes	%	±%
Alliance	N. Orrell	1,278	24.0	
Alliance	M. Kirkham	1,018	19.1	
Alliance	S. Fenn	949	17.8	
Labour	A. Dawson	721	13.5	
Labour	D. Golden	683	12.8	
Labour	F. Stringfellow	678	12.7	

St. Andrews
Party	Candidate	Votes	%	±%
Alliance	K. Orrell	530	23.6	
Conservative	N. Greenwood	433	19.3	
Alliance	D. Golden	364	16.2	
Conservative	S. Kelley	345	15.4	
Labour	C. Lamb	322	14.4	
Labour	D. Wynn	249	11.1	

St. Johns
Party	Candidate	Votes	%	±%
Labour	L. Hocking	1,431	29.6	
Labour	M. Beardsworth	1,110	23.0	
Labour	S. Ryan	1,050	21.7	
Conservative	A. Bilsborough	620	12.8	
Alliance	J. Loughlin	617	12.8	

St. Leonards
Party	Candidate	Votes	%	±%
Conservative	J. Lawson	969	24.9	
Conservative	K. Palmer	949	24.4	
Conservative	H. Clarkson	880	22.6	
Alliance	R. Barraclough	606	15.6	
Labour	K. Sharples	491	12.6	

St. Marys
Party	Candidate	Votes	%	±%
Conservative	J. Marsden	926	15.9	
Conservative	H. Parr	873	14.9	
Conservative	W. Jackson	850	24.5	
Alliance	E. Day	619	10.6	
Alliance	M. Edwin	612	10.5	
Alliance	M. Humphrayson	561	9.6	
Labour	M. Hancock	473	8.1	
Labour	L. Croft	473	8.1	
Labour	J. McDonald	455	7.8	

Walton-Le-Dale South
Party	Candidate	Votes	%	±%
Labour	T. Hanson	1,093	16.8	
Conservative	E. Gregston	1,064	16.3	
Labour	T. King	1,034	15.9	
Labour	J. Owen	982	15.1	
Conservative	W. Park	968	14.9	
Conservative	E. Smith	962	14.8	
Alliance	J. Betts	408	6.3	

Walton-Le-Dale West
Party	Candidate	Votes	%	±%
Conservative	E. Beckett	1,100	19.8	
Conservative	C. Hughes	1,060	19.1	
Labour	A. White	1,043	18.8	
Conservative	E. Price	906	16.3	
Labour	G. Lewis	724	13.1	
Labour	P. Yorke	714	12.9	
