= 1995 South Ribble Borough Council election =

1995 UK local government election

Elections to South Ribble Borough Council were held on 4 May 1995. The whole council was up for election and a Labour majority was returned, the Conservatives having lost control of the council. The election saw Tim Farron, future leader of the Liberal Democrats, returned as a councillor for Leyland Central.

Composition of the Borough Council after the 1995 election

== Election result ==
South Ribble local election result 1995
Party	Seats	Gains	Losses	Net gain/loss	Seats %	Votes %	Votes	+/−
Labour	29			▲14	53.7	47.8	37,883	
Conservative	16			▼17	29.6	35.4	28,046	
Liberal Democrats	9			▲3	16.7	16.5	13,094	
Liberal	0			Steady	0.0	0.3	238	

== Ward results ==
All Saints
Party	Candidate	Votes	%	±%
Labour	Tom Sharrat	1,399	23.2	
Labour	Barrie Yates	1,219	20.2	
Labour	B. Greenland	1,206	20.0	
Conservative	P. Ames	709	11.7	
Conservative	F. Walker	668	11.1	
Conservative	N. Dean	622	10.3	
Liberal Democrats	S. Conforth	215	3.6	

Bamber Bridge Central
Party	Candidate	Votes	%	±%
Labour	G. Davies	1,014	19.3	
Labour	B. Pemberton	968	18.5	
Labour	D. Banks	958	18.3	
Conservative	F. Cooper	763	14.6	
Conservative	G. Woods	741	14.1	
Conservative	E. McMahon	637	12.2	
Liberal Democrats	L. Wright	161	3.1	

Bamber Bridge South
Party	Candidate	Votes	%	±%
Labour	T. Hanson	968	23.7	
Labour	J. Owen	961	23.6	
Labour	J. Swain	959	23.5	
Conservative	K. Fell	371	9.1	
Conservative	J. Lambert	342	8.4	
Conservative	F. Redfern	326	8.0	
Liberal Democrats	J. Edwin	152	3.7	

Charnock
Party	Candidate	Votes	%	±%
Conservative	N. Crossley	356	48.7	
Labour	D. Wooldridge	345	47.2	
Liberal Democrats	J. Thomason	30	4.1	

Farington
Party	Candidate	Votes	%	±%
Labour	G. Baehren	869	16.2	
Labour	S. Davies	851	15.9	
Labour	F. Heyworth	695	13.0	
Conservative	G. Cross	673	12.6	
Conservative	G. Thorpe	655	12.2	
Conservative	M. McNulty	630	11.8	
Liberal Democrats	J. Bullock	376	7.0	
Liberal Democrats	S. Smith	376	5.8	
Liberal Democrats	G. Schofield	298	5.6	

Howick
Party	Candidate	Votes	%	±%
Conservative	D. Stewart	593	28.7	
Conservative	H. Smith	590	28.5	
Labour	J. Dickinson	339	16.4	
Labour	H. Dubery	310	15.0	
Liberal Democrats	V. Howarth	125	6.0	
Liberal Democrats	M. Garratt	112	5.4	

Hutton & New Longton
Party	Candidate	Votes	%	±%
Conservative	J. Breakell	859	19.9	
Conservative	J. Hesketh	827	19.1	
Conservative	M. Barker	704	16.3	
Labour	A. Monks	600	13.9	
Liberal Democrats	N. Sumner	504	11.7	
Liberal Democrats	A. Miller	496	11.5	
Liberal Democrats	W. Bryce	329	7.6	

Kingsfold
Party	Candidate	Votes	%	±%
Labour	C. Wooldridge	1,092	19.4	
Labour	H. Gore	1,090	19.4	
Labour	J. Patten	1,062	18.9	
Conservative	B. Bannister	784	14.0	
Conservative	F. Almond	719	12.8	
Conservative	G. Owen	687	12.2	
Liberal Democrats	W. Bryce	187	3.3	

Leyland Central
Party	Candidate	Votes	%	±%
Liberal Democrats	Tim Farron	880	28.6	
Liberal Democrats	D. Foster	800	26.0	
Labour	G. Eckersley	629	20.4	
Labour	T. Abbott	562	18.3	
Conservative	S. Smith	107	3.5	
Conservative	L. Wollard	99	3.2	

Leyland St. Ambrose
Party	Candidate	Votes	%	±%
Liberal Democrats	N. Orrell	815	30.9	
Liberal Democrats	M. Kirkham	773	29.2	
Labour	G. Golden	473	18.0	
Labour	B. Walmsley	423	16.0	
Conservative	M. Long	80	3.0	
Conservative	D. Walmsley	76	2.9	

Leyland St. Johns
Party	Candidate	Votes	%	±%
Labour	W. Evans	1,238	31.5	
Labour	D. Harrison	1,204	30.1	
Labour	B. Wilson	1,138	29.0	
Liberal	R. Prescott	238	6.1	
Conservative	D. Baker	209	5.3	

Leyland St. Marys
Party	Candidate	Votes	%	±%
Liberal Democrats	J. Knowles	988	17.6	
Liberal Democrats	A. Roscoe	977	17.4	
Liberal Democrats	M. Duckworth	965	17.2	
Labour	A. Nicholson	583	10.4	
Labour	P. Rickard	555	10.0	
Labour	D. Womack	552	9.9	
Conservative	J. Treacher	513	9.2	
Conservative	H. Parr	508	9.1	
Conservative	A. Probert	462	8.2	

Little Hoole & Much Hoole
Party	Candidate	Votes	%	±%
Conservative	E. Webster	518	26.0	
Labour	D. Webster	494	24.7	
Labour	R. Wright	452	22.6	
Conservative	J. Knowles	407	20.3	
Liberal Democrats	M. Bull	127	6.4	

Longton Central & West
Party	Candidate	Votes	%	±%
Conservative	R. Colton	738	21.3	
Conservative	P. Stettner	651	18.8	
Conservative	E. Nichollas	645	18.6	
Labour	N. Briggs	611	17.6	
Liberal Democrats	I. Clements	423	12.2	
Liberal Democrats	H. Farron	127	11.4	

Lostock Hall
Party	Candidate	Votes	%	±%
Labour	J. Pownall	1,015	16.4	
Labour	M. Carolan	992	16.0	
Labour	M. Thistlethwaite	975	15.7	
Conservative	J. Hughes	906	14.6	
Conservative	K. Beattie	812	13.1	
Conservative	D. Parkinson	774	12.5	
Liberal Democrats	B. Lawrenson	192	3.1	

Manor
Party	Candidate	Votes	%	±%
Liberal Democrats	D. Howarth	732	28.7	
Liberal Democrats	J. Webb	681	26.7	
Conservative	M. Askew	580	22.7	
Conservative	V. Baker	560	21.9	

Middleforth Green
Party	Candidate	Votes	%	±%
Labour	D. Pownall	841	28.0	
Labour	D. Bretherton	838	27.8	
Conservative	J. Richardson	680	22.6	
Conservative	M. Elliott	560	21.7	

Moss Side
Party	Candidate	Votes	%	±%
Labour	A. Brown	1,099	24.7	
Labour	D. Snape	1,038	23.4	
Labour	G. Lewis	994	22.4	
Conservative	W. Wright	343	7.7	
Conservative	D. Hayton	314	7.1	
Conservative	G. Molloy	298	6.7	
Liberal Democrats	(Ms.) M. Simmonds	184	4.1	
Liberal Democrats	M. Simmonds	172	3.9	

Priory
Party	Candidate	Votes	%	±%
Conservative	R. Haworth	577	29.5	
Conservative	A. Simmons	511	26.1	
Labour	R. Durham	491	25.1	
Liberal Democrats	M. Cassell	210	10.7	
Liberal Democrats	A. Pimblett	168	8.6	

Samlesbury & Cuerdale
Party	Candidate	Votes	%	±%
Conservative	S. Long	276	60.8	
Labour	J. Horner	178	39.2	

Seven Stars
Party	Candidate	Votes	%	±%
Labour	J. Kelly	803	41.7	
Labour	A. Dawson	793	41.2	
Conservative	J. Robinson	183	9.5	
Conservative	D. Forrest	145	7.5	

Walton Le Dale
Party	Candidate	Votes	%	±%
Conservative	J. Lawson	773	17.2	
Conservative	H. Clarkson	769	17.1	
Conservative	K. Palmer	768	17.1	
Labour	S. Bennett	718	16.0	
Labour	M. McClumpha	646	14.4	
Labour	B. Mounsey	643	14.3	
Liberal Democrats	M. Beckerleg	173	3.9	
