= 1979 South Ribble Borough Council election =

Elections to South Ribble Borough Council were held on 3 May 1979. The whole council was up for election and the Conservative Party retained its majority.

Composition of the Borough Council after the 1979 election

== Election result ==
South Ribble local election result 1979
| Party | Seats | Gains | Losses | Net gain/loss | Seats % | Votes % | Votes | +/− |
|---|---|---|---|---|---|---|---|---|
| Conservative | 42 | | | ▼3 | 77.8 | 60.0 | 64964 | |
| Labour | 10 | | | ▲2 | 18.5 | 36.1 | 39142 | |
| Liberal | 1 | | | ▲1 | 1.9 | 3.9 | 4221 | |
| Ind. Conservative | 1 | | | ▲1 | 1.9 | | N/A (Note: Elected unopposed.) | |

== Ward results ==
All Saints
| Party | Candidate | Votes | % | ±% |
|---|---|---|---|---|
| Conservative | M. Rhodes | 2,088 | 27.3 | |
| Conservative | A. Clark | 1,832 | 24.0 | |
| Conservative | R. Welhmam | 1,803 | 23.6 | |
| Labour | D. Davies | 1007 | 13.2 | |
| Labour | P. Nugent | 910 | 11.9 | |

Bamber Bridge Central
| Party | Candidate | Votes | % | ±% |
|---|---|---|---|---|
| Conservative | F. Cooper | 1,872 | 22.8 | |
| Conservative | G. Woods | 1,845 | 22.5 | |
| Conservative | L. Swarbrick | 1,676 | 20.4 | |
| Labour | G. Davies | 1470 | 17.9 | |
| Labour | D. Watson | 1335 | 16.3 | |

Charnock
| Party | Candidate | Votes | % | ±% |
|---|---|---|---|---|
| Conservative | R. Ainscough | 559 | 58.5 | |
| Labour | J. Stoker | 396 | 41.5 | |

Farington
| Party | Candidate | Votes | % | ±% |
|---|---|---|---|---|
| Conservative | L. Craven | 1,799 | 24.5 | |
| Conservative | C. Leather | 1,707 | 23.2 | |
| Conservative | G. Thorpe | 1,686 | 22.9 | |
| Labour | N. Ward | 1096 | 14.9 | |
| Labour | B. Guilfoyle | 1068 | 14.5 | |

Howick
| Party | Candidate | Votes | % | ±% |
|---|---|---|---|---|
| Conservative | H. Smith | 1,476 | 43.1 | |
| Conservative | D. Stewart | 1,456 | 42.5 | |
| Labour | E. Breakell | 493 | 14.4 | |

Hutton & New Longton
| Party | Candidate | Votes | % | ±% |
|---|---|---|---|---|
| Conservative | M. Robinson | Unopposed | | |
| Ind. Conservative | R. Hawkins | Unopposed | | |
| Conservative | J. Simpson | Unopposed | | |

Kingsfold
| Party | Candidate | Votes | % | ±% |
|---|---|---|---|---|
| Conservative | A. Bannister | 1,366 | 18.8 | |
| Conservative | E. Carson | 1,366 | 18.8 | |
| Conservative | J. Jenkinson | 1,313 | 18.1 | |
| Labour | M. Lyons | 1212 | 16.7 | |
| Labour | J. Harvey | 1006 | 13.9 | |
| Labour | E. McEvoy | 986 | 13.6 | |

Little Hoole & Much Hoole
| Party | Candidate | Votes | % | ±% |
|---|---|---|---|---|
| Conservative | J. Knowles | Unopposed | | |
| Conservative | E. Webster | Unopposed | | |

Longton Central & West
| Party | Candidate | Votes | % | ±% |
|---|---|---|---|---|
| Conservative | A. Burdon | 2,285 | 31.9 | |
| Conservative | J. Breakell | 2,093 | 29.3 | |
| Labour | E. Nicholls | 710 | 10.0 | |

Manor
| Party | Candidate | Votes | % | ±% |
|---|---|---|---|---|
| Conservative | J. Thompson | 1,601 | 42.0 | |
| Conservative | W. Eccles | 1,545 | 40.5 | |
| Labour | N. Hall | 710 | 17.4 | |

Middleforth Green
| Party | Candidate | Votes | % | ±% |
|---|---|---|---|---|
| Conservative | K. Dickinson | 1,146 | 40.0 | |
| Conservative | R. Harwood | 961 | 33.1 | |
| Labour | J. Prance | 794 | 27.4 | |

Moss Side
| Party | Candidate | Votes | % | ±% |
|---|---|---|---|---|
| Conservative | D. Just | 758 | 54.3 | |
| Labour | D. King | 639 | 45.7 | |

Priory
| Party | Candidate | Votes | % | ±% |
|---|---|---|---|---|
| Conservative | S. Allison | 1,234 | 44.7 | |
| Conservative | W. Valentine | 1,086 | 39.4 | |
| Labour | A. Calder | 439 | 15.9 | |

Samlesbury
| Party | Candidate | Votes | % | ±% |
|---|---|---|---|---|
| Conservative | O. Barton | 634 | 89.7 | |
| Labour | J. Minall | 73 | 10.3 | |

Seven Stars
| Party | Candidate | Votes | % | ±% |
|---|---|---|---|---|
| Labour | C. Dawber | 1,534 | 23.4 | |
| Labour | J. Bradley | 1,438 | 21.9 | |
| Labour | J. Kelly | 1,391 | 21.2 | |
| Conservative | B. Gadd | 755 | 11.5 | |
| Conservative | R. Smith | 730 | 11.1 | |
| Conservative | B. Gadd | 717 | 10.9 | |

St. Ambrose Wesley
| Party | Candidate | Votes | % | ±% |
|---|---|---|---|---|
| Labour | A. Dawson | 1,194 | 15.1 | |
| Liberal | N. Orrel | 1,095 | 13.9 | |
| Labour | D. Golden | 1,052 | 13.3 | |
| Labour | J. Ryan | 1036 | 13.1 | |
| Conservative | J. Demack | 827 | 10.5 | |
| Conservative | G. Eland | 732 | 9.3 | |
| Conservative | P. Mansell | 721 | 9.1 | |
| Liberal | M. Kirkham | 636 | 8.1 | |
| Liberal | D. Lake | 597 | 7.6 | |

St. Andrews
| Party | Candidate | Votes | % | ±% |
|---|---|---|---|---|
| Conservative | N. Greenwood | 874 | 31.8 | |
| Conservative | S. Kelley | 758 | 27.6 | |
| Labour | C. Lamb | 608 | 22.1 | |
| Liberal | H. Stevens | 508 | 18.5 | |

St. Johns
| Party | Candidate | Votes | % | ±% |
|---|---|---|---|---|
| Labour | J. Hocking | 2,017 | 29.1 | |
| Labour | F. Stringfellow | 1,915 | 27.6 | |
| Labour | M. Walsh | 1,841 | 22.6 | |
| Conservative | V. Just | 1159 | 16.7 | |

St. Leonards
| Party | Candidate | Votes | % | ±% |
|---|---|---|---|---|
| Conservative | J. Coupe | 1,687 | 25.8 | |
| Conservative | J. Lawson | 1,591 | 24.4 | |
| Conservative | K. Palmer | 1,526 | 23.4 | |
| Labour | K. Sharples | 952 | 14.6 | |
| Labour | M. Kosickis | 771 | 11.8 | |

St. Marys
| Party | Candidate | Votes | % | ±% |
|---|---|---|---|---|
| Conservative | J. Hall | 1,701 | 26.3 | |
| Conservative | J. Marsden | 1,623 | 25.1 | |
| Conservative | B. Pickup | 1,158 | 17.9 | |
| Labour | J. Crossley | 1091 | 16.9 | |
| Liberal | T. Jones | 889 | 13.8 | |

Walton-Le-Dale South
| Party | Candidate | Votes | % | ±% |
|---|---|---|---|---|
| Conservative | T. Dixon | 1,698 | 17.8 | |
| Conservative | E. Gregson | 1,681 | 17.6 | |
| Labour | G. Woodcock | 1,625 | 17.0 | |
| Conservative | D. Hughes | 1616 | 16.9 | |
| Labour | T. Hanson | 1493 | 15.7 | |
| Labour | D. Grayham | 1424 | 14.9 | |

Walton-Le-Dale West
| Party | Candidate | Votes | % | ±% |
|---|---|---|---|---|
| Conservative | E. Beckett | 1,499 | 18.4 | |
| Conservative | C. Elliott | 1,335 | 16.4 | |
| Labour | A. White | 1,333 | 16.4 | |
| Conservative | D. Baxter | 1616 | 16.2 | |
| Labour | J. Morrison | 1140 | 14.0 | |
| Labour | E. Hejda-Morrison | 981 | 12.1 | |
| Liberal | R. Watson | 526 | 6.5 | |
