= 1973 South Ribble Borough Council election =

The first elections to South Ribble Borough Council were held in June 1973. The elected Borough Council, newly created by the Local Government Act 1972, would act as a shadow authority before coming into its powers later in 1973. The whole council was up for election and the Conservative Party won a majority.

Composition of the Borough Council after the 1973 election

== Election result ==
South Ribble local election result 1973
Party	Seats	Gains	Losses	Net gain/loss	Seats %	Votes %	Votes	+/−
Conservative	30	N/A	N/A	N/A	61.2	56.1	37,249	N/A
Labour	16	N/A	N/A	N/A	32.5	32.5	21,585	N/A
Liberal	2	N/A	N/A	N/A	4.1	8.2	5,424	N/A
Independent	1	N/A	N/A	N/A	2.0	3.2	2,157	N/A

== Ward results ==
All Saints
Party	Candidate	Votes	%	±%
Conservative	M. Rhodes	885	27.9	
Conservative	R. Knowles	869	27.4	
Conservative	R. Welhmam	840	26.5	
Labour	K. Lloyd	573	18.1	

Bamber Bridge Central
Party	Candidate	Votes	%	±%
Conservative	F. Cooper	965	14.8	
Labour	G. Davies	940	14.5	
Labour	F. Walsh	939	14.4	
Conservative	G. Woods	916	14.1	
Conservative	R. Dixon	865	13.3	
Labour	G. Nicholson	841	12.9	
Liberal	J. Bundy	391	6.0	
Liberal	W. Parker	333	5.1	
Liberal	A. Hodges	311	4.8	

Farington
Party	Candidate	Votes	%	±%
Labour	P. Ward	736	18.5	
Conservative	J. Littler	731	18.4	
Conservative	L. Craven	722	18.1	
Conservative	R. Robinson	621	15.6	
Labour	E. Martin	605	15.2	
Labour	S. Turton	567	14.2	

Hutton & New Longton
Party	Candidate	Votes	%	±%
Independent	V. Peacock	1,081	35.6	
Conservative	M. Robinson	877	28.9	
Conservative	W. Eccles	826	27.2	
Labour	K. Eastham	255	8.4	

Little Hoole & Much Hoole
Party	Candidate	Votes	%	±%
Conservative	J. Knowles	250	76.9	
Labour	J. Nicholson	75	23.1	

Longton Central & West
Party	Candidate	Votes	%	±%
Conservative	A. Burden	893	32.9	
Conservative	A. Ashburner	838	30.9	
Conservative	D.Protheroe	740	27.3	
Labour	B. White	241	8.9	

No.1 (Leyland St.Ambrose)
Party	Candidate	Votes	%	±%
Labour	A. Dawson	479	20.9	
Labour	J. Crossley	427	18.6	
Conservative	W. Jackson	390	17.0	
Liberal	M. Kirkham	353	15.4	
Conservative	R. Kelley	348	15.2	
Liberal	B. Newby	299	13.0	

No. 16 (Penwortham Middleforth)
Party	Candidate	Votes	%	±%
Labour	M. Lyons	961	12.0	
Conservative	A. Roskell	912	11.4	
Conservative	V. Rhodes	912	11.4	
Conservative	R. Richardson	808	10.1	
Labour	H. Whitson	797	10.0	
Labour	J. Stoker	784	9.8	
Conservative	R. Caunce	769	9.6	
Conservative	J. Thompson	764	9.6	
Liberal	H. Goodier	650	8.1	
Independent	A. Johnson	640	8.0	

No. 17 (Penwortham St. Marys)
Party	Candidate	Votes	%	±%
Conservative	D. Stewart	1,802	19.7	
Conservative	H. Smith	1,735	19.0	
Conservative	S. Allison	1,675	18.3	
Conservative	W. Valentine	1,647	18.0	
Conservative	J. Rickards	1,643	18.0	
Labour	P. Harknett	643	7.0	

No. 3 (Leyland St. James)
Party	Candidate	Votes	%	±%
Labour	A. Bamber	894	18.5	
Labour	C. Dawber	877	18.1	
Labour	A. Kelly	802	16.6	
Conservative	J. Hall	747	15.4	
Conservative	D. Kidd	574	11.9	
Conservative	L. Jackson	543	11.2	
Liberal	D. Marston	405	8.4	

No. 4 (Leyland St. Johns)
Party	Candidate	Votes	%	±%
Labour	L. Hocking	1,071	28.0	
Labour	F. Stingfellow	1,045	27.4	
Labour	M. Walsh	925	24.2	
Liberal	R. Caunce-Peacock	435	11.4	
Conservative	G. Eland	344	9.0	

No. 5 (Leyland St. Marys)
Party	Candidate	Votes	%	±%
Conservative	J. Marsden	597	23.4	
Liberal	A. Nelson	568	22.2	
Conservative	B. Pickup	556	21.8	
Liberal	L. Lloyd	423	16.5	
Labour	A. Brown	412	16.1	

No. 6 (Leyland Wesley)
Party	Candidate	Votes	%	±%
Labour	R. Wilkinson	455	64.4	
Liberal	V. Barnes	251	35.6	

Samlesbury & Cuerdale
Party	Candidate	Votes	%	±%
Conservative	F. Barton	239	74.2	
Labour	D. Eastham	83	25.8	

St. Andrews
Party	Candidate	Votes	%	±%
Liberal	N. Orrel	666	28.7	
Conservative	N. Greenwood	507	21.8	
Conservative	S. Kelley	448	19.3	
Labour	E. Walsh	362	15.6	
Liberal	J. Knowles	339	14.6	

St. Leonards
Party	Candidate	Votes	%	±%
Conservative	J. Coupe	911	31.1	
Conservative	J. Lawson	888	30.3	
Conservative	K. Palmer	861	29.4	
Labour	N. Kosickis	270	9.2	

Walton-Le-Dale South
Party	Candidate	Votes	%	±%
Conservative	H. Kerfoot	855	16.5	
Labour	T. Bayes	829	16.0	
Conservative	P. Smith	789	15.2	
Conservative	W. Towers	770	14.9	
Labour	G. Woodcock	770	14.5	
Labour	W. Corney	747	14.4	
Independent	F. Hudson	436	8.4	

Walton-Le-Dale West
Party	Candidate	Votes	%	±%
Conservative	R. Smith	819	17.9	
Conservative	J. Ratcliffe	786	17.2	
Labour	A. White	782	17.1	
Conservative	J. Bell	772	16.9	
Labour	T. Baldwin	736	16.1	
Labour	T. Machell	680	14.9	
