= 1987 South Ribble Borough Council election =

Elections to South Ribble Borough Council were held on 7 May 1987. The whole council was up for election and the Conservative Party retained its majority. The elections were the first to be held under the new boundaries laid out in March 1987.

Composition of the Borough Council after the 1987 election

== Election result ==
South Ribble local election result 1987
Party	Seats	Gains	Losses	Net gain/loss	Seats %	Votes %	Votes	+/−
Conservative	37			▼2	68.5	48.8	41,789	
Labour	11			Steady	20.4	36.0	30,891	
Alliance	6			▲2	11.1	14.5	12,405	
Independent	0			Steady	0.0	0.7	612	

== Ward results ==
All Saints
Party	Candidate	Votes	%	±%
Labour	B. Greenland	1,198	18.3	
Conservative	M. Rhodes	1,145	17.5	
Conservative	P. Young	1,104	16.9	
Labour	B. Yates	1070	16.4	
Conservative	B. Gadd	1054	16.1	
Labour	J. Swain	969	14.8	

Bamber Bridge Central
Party	Candidate	Votes	%	±%
Conservative	F. Cooper	1,177	20.6	
Conservative	G. Woods	1,145	20.0	
Conservative	T. Dixon	1,079	18.9	
Labour	D. Watson	793	13.9	
Labour	E. Calvert	754	13.2	
Labour	A. Nicholson	754	13.2	

Bamber Bridge South
Party	Candidate	Votes	%	±%
Conservative	E. Barrersby	871	18.0	
Labour	T. Hanson	833	17.3	
Conservative	E. Smith	808	16.7	
Labour	W. Harrison	781	16.2	
Conservative	D. Titterington	770	15.9	
Labour	J. Owen	765	15.8	

Charnock
Party	Candidate	Votes	%	±%
Labour	P. Dowdall	314	42.3	
Conservative	J. Byme	292	39.3	
Alliance	B. Ward	137	18.4	

Farington
Party	Candidate	Votes	%	±%
Conservative	G. Cross	1,100	18.7	
Conservative	G. Thorpe	1,074	18.2	
Conservative	E. Chadwick	1,040	17.6	
Labour	N. Berry	821	13.9	
Labour	G. Baehren	796	13.5	
Labour	G. Durham	717	12.2	
Alliance	J.Healy	346	5.9	

Howick
Party	Candidate	Votes	%	±%
Conservative	D. Stewart	807	33.0	
Conservative	H. Smith	780	31.9	
Alliance	J. Thomason	220	9.0	
Labour	J. Crookes	216	8.8	
Alliance	C. Miller	212	8.7	
Labour	K. Shaw	208	8.5	

Hutton & New Longton
Party	Candidate	Votes	%	±%
Conservative	J. Hesketh	1,122	25.2	
Conservative	M. Jenkinson	1,015	22.8	
Conservative	A. Underwood	948	21.3	
Independent	P. Wearden	612	13.7	
Labour	R. Parkinson	398	8.9	
Labour	I. Chewter	366	8.2	

Kingsfold
Party	Candidate	Votes	%	±%
Conservative	A. Bannister	1,027	19.5	
Conservative	E. Carson	946	18.0	
Conservative	J. Jenkinson	879	16.7	
Labour	S. Crozier	702	13.3	
Labour	D. Wooldridge	695	13.2	
Labour	R. Millar	682	13.0	
Alliance	G. Owen	335	6.4	

Leyland Central
Party	Candidate	Votes	%	±%
Alliance	J. Jenkinson	879	28.8	
Alliance	M. Gardner	676	22.2	
Labour	A. Dawson	485	15.9	
Labour	J. Kelly	695	15.6	
Conservative	S. Kelley	303	9.9	
Conservative	R.Harwood	233	7.6	

Leyland St. Ambrose
Party	Candidate	Votes	%	±%
Alliance	N. Orrell	1,130	35.2	
Alliance	M. Kirkham	1,046	32.6	
Labour	D. Golden	386	12.0	
Labour	F. Stringfellow	372	11.6	
Conservative	N. Dean	278	8.7	

Leyland St. Johns
Party	Candidate	Votes	%	±%
Labour	J. Hocking	1,272	26.2	
Labour	M. Beardsworth	1,142	23.5	
Labour	J. Ryan	998	20.5	
Conservative	S. Postance	417	8.6	
Alliance	K. Walmsley	364	7.5	
Alliance	E. Marshall	343	7.1	
Alliance	J. Ritchie	324	6.7	

Leyland St. Marys
Party	Candidate	Votes	%	±%
Alliance	J. Edwin	925	13.6	
Conservative	J. Treacher	905	13.3	
Alliance	J. Knowles	900	13.2	
Conservative	H. Parr	876	12.8	
Alliance	M. Simmonds	811	11.9	
Conservative	M. Creer	797	11.7	
Labour	C. Lamb	569	8.3	
Labour	G. Lewis	522	7.7	
Labour	C. Bass	513	7.5	

Little Hoole & Much Hoole
Party	Candidate	Votes	%	±%
Conservative	E. Webster	740	36.0	
Conservative	J. Knowles	736	35.8	
Labour	J. Haddock	304	14.8	
Labour	M. Graham	277	13.5	

Longton Central & West
Party	Candidate	Votes	%	±%
Conservative	R. Colton	993	26.9	
Conservative	J. Breakell	908	24.6	
Conservative	E. Nicholls	903	24.4	
Alliance	T. Yates	325	8.8	
Labour	S. Breakell	309	8.4	
Labour	N. Hall	257	7.0	

Lostock Hall
Party	Candidate	Votes	%	±%
Conservative	N. Crossley	1,253	20.6	
Conservative	K. Beattie	1,250	20.5	
Conservative	J. Hughes	1,243	20.4	
Labour	B. Cox	824	13.5	
Labour	D. Smith	769	12.6	
Labour	P. Farrell	756	12.4	

Manor
Party	Candidate	Votes	%	±%
Conservative	M. Barker	721	22.9	
Alliance	J. Holleran	698	22.1	
Conservative	B. Thompson	680	21.6	
Alliance	M. Thomason	598	19.0	
Labour	W. Crozier	229	7.3	
Labour	A. Needham	228	7.2	

Middleforth Green
Party	Candidate	Votes	%	±%
Conservative	K. Dickinson	989	32.5	
Conservative	J. Richardson	775	25.5	
Labour	J. Stoker	452	14.8	
Labour	D. Pownall	443	14.5	
Alliance	J. Holleran	386	12.7	

Moss Side
Party	Candidate	Votes	%	±%
Labour	R. Quinn	805	18.6	
Labour	A. Brown	742	17.2	
Labour	M. Evenson	685	15.9	
Conservative	N. Greenwood	624	14.4	
Conservative	R. Smith	579	13.4	
Conservative	M. Postance	577	13.3	
Alliance	R. Prescott	577	7.1	

Priory
Party	Candidate	Votes	%	±%
Conservative	B. Moulding	820	29.9	
Conservative	R. Haworth	813	29.7	
Alliance	P. Farrer	410	15.0	
Alliance	J. Farmer	368	13.4	
Labour	J. Clarkson	171	6.2	
Labour	R. Prescott	157	5.7	

Samlesbury & Cuerdale
Party	Candidate	Votes	%	±%
Conservative	F. Barton	306	73.4	
Labour	R. Ashburner	111	26.6	

Seven Stars
Party	Candidate	Votes	%	±%
Labour	E. Croft	809	39.9	
Labour	J. McDonald	797	39.3	
Alliance	H. Prescott	420	20.7	

Walton Le Dale
Party	Candidate	Votes	%	±%
Conservative	J. Lawson	997	23.0	
Conservative	H. Clarkson	950	21.9	
Conservative	K. Palmer	941	21.7	
Labour	G. Davies	442	10.2	
Labour	A. Calder	382	8.8	
Labour	K. Jones	376	8.7	
Alliance	B. Moore	245	5.7	
