= 2015 South Ribble Borough Council election =

2015 UK local government election

Map of the results of the 2015 South Ribble Borough Council election. Conservatives in blue, Labour in red and Liberal Democrats in yellow.

Local elections were held for South Ribble Borough Council on 7 May 2015, the same day as the 2015 United Kingdom general election and other 2015 United Kingdom local elections. Local elections are held every four years with all councillors up for election in multi-member electoral wards.

== Boundary review ==
The Local Government Boundary Commission for England reviewed the local boundaries of South Ribble Borough Council in 2014.

The number of councillors elected to South Ribble council was reduced to 50, from the wards outlined below. The changes were made official by The South Ribble (Electoral Changes) Order 2014.

Electoral wards in South Ribble, 2015
Ward	Number of councillors
Bamber Bridge East	2
Bamber Bridge West	2
Broad Oak	2
Broadfield	2
Buckshaw and Worden	2
Charnock	2
Coupe Green and Gregson Lane	2
Earnshaw Bridge	2
Farington East	2
Farington West	2
Hoole	2
Howick and Priory	3
Leyland Central	2
Longton and Hutton	3
Lostock Hall	3
Middleforth	3
Moss Side	2
New Longton and Hutton East	2
Samlesbury and Walton	2
Seven Stars	2
St. Ambrose	2
Walton-le-Dale East	2
Walton-le-Dale East	2

== Ward results ==
Bamber Bridge East
Party	Candidate	Votes	%	±%
Labour	Paul Foster	1,051	30.7	
Labour	Caleb Tomlinson	947	27.7	
Conservative	Taylor James	710	20.7	
Conservative	Rita Hughes	714	20.9	

Bamber Bridge East
Party	Candidate	Votes	%	±%
Labour	Mick Higgins	1,127	31.0	
Labour	Dave Watts	1,021	28.1	
Conservative	Josephine Nelson	752	20.7	
Conservative	Kathleen Yates	736	20.2	

Broadfield
Party	Candidate	Votes	%	±%
Labour	Mick Titherington	1,373	35.6	
Labour	Matthew Tomlinson	1,292	33.4	
Conservative	Paul Moon	614	16.0	
Conservative	Edward Hardy	582	15.1	

Coupe Green & Gregson Lane
Party	Candidate	Votes	%	±%
Conservative	Warren Lee Bennett	1,382	33.4	
Conservative	Jim Marsh	1,371	33.1	
Labour	Mark Bradley	794	19.2	
Green	Graham Dixon	592	14.3	

Lostock Hall
Party	Candidate	Votes	%	±%
Conservative	Clifford Hughes	1,663	19.8	
Conservative	Jacqui Mort	1,473	17.5	
Conservative	Noreen Blow	1,403	16.7	
Labour	Lee Graham	1359	16.2	
Labour	Stuart Cook	1330	15.8	
Labour	Sue Prynn	1330	14.1	

Moss Side
Party	Candidate	Votes	%	±%
Conservative	Anthony Green	1,068	26.0	
Conservative	Mary Green	1,041	25.3	
Labour	James Harrison	689	16.8	
Labour	Peter Holker	645	15.7	
UKIP	Bernard Rodgers	353	8.6	
UKIP	Linda Rodgers	314	7.6	

New Longton & Hutton East
Party	Candidate	Votes	%	±%
Conservative	Rose Smith	1,739	32.7	
Conservative	Phil Smith	1,604	30.1	
Labour	Anne Brown	637	12.0	
Labour	Geoff Key	607	11.4	
Green	Charles Henshaw	324	6.1	
Liberal Democrats	Julie Hartley	224	4.2	
Liberal Democrats	Anthony Hartley	182	3.4	

Samlesbury & Walton
Party	Candidate	Votes	%	±%
Conservative	Barrie Yates	1,295	34.4	
Conservative	Peter Mullineux	1,187	31.5	
Labour	Graham Davies	701	18.6	
Labour	Andy Bennison	583	15.5	

Charnock
Party	Candidate	Votes	%	±%
Labour	Ian Watkinson	824	25.5	
Labour	Elizabeth Mawson	788	24.4	
Conservative	Dorothy Garner	752	23.3	
Conservative	Melvyn Gardner	689	21.3	
Liberal Democrats	Mary Young	181	5.6	

Earnshaw Bridge
Party	Candidate	Votes	%	±%
Labour	Bill Evans	959	24.7	
Conservative	Susan Snape	816	21.0	
Conservative	Cathy Roper	701	18.1	
Labour	Dave Wynn	680	17.5	
UKIP	Patricia Taylor	409	10.5	
UKIP	Walter Taylor	314	8.1	

Leyland Central
Party	Candidate	Votes	%	±%
Labour	Claire Hamilton	1,049	24.7	
Labour	Derek Forrest	1,011	23.8	
Conservative	Pete Aspinall	815	19.2	
Conservative	Ann Pearmain	738	17.4	
Green	Tom Bidwell	322	7.6	
Liberal Democrats	Gwendoline Schofield	187	4.4	
Liberal Democrats	Paul Valentine	119	2.8	

Farington West
Party	Candidate	Votes	%	±%
Conservative	Graham Walton	1,045	29.0	
Conservative	Karen Walton	919	25.5	
Labour	Emma Buchanan	709	19.7	
Labour	Barbara Davis	540	15.0	
Liberal Democrats	Judith Davidson	255	7.0	
Liberal Democrats	Matthew Howarth	134	3.7	

Seven Stars
Party	Candidate	Votes	%	±%
Labour	Jane Bell	1,321	35.6	
Labour	Fred Heyworth	919	22.7	
Conservative	Louise Gough	677	18.3	
Conservative	Tony Green	597	16.1	
UKIP	David Duxbury	273	7.4	

Longton & Hutton West
Party	Candidate	Votes	%	±%
Conservative	John Clark	1,940	20.8	
Conservative	Colin Coulton	1,937	20.8	
Conservative	Jon Hesketh	1,743	18.7	
UKIP	Julie Buttery	817	8.8	
Labour	Neil Scanlan	673	7.2	
Labour	Carol Wooldridge	532	5.7	
Labour	Michael Kelly	520	5.6	
Liberal Democrats	Jeremy Barker	458	5.0	
Liberal Democrats	David Moore	415	4.4	
Liberal Democrats	Geoffrey Crewe	296	3.2	

St. Ambrose
Party	Candidate	Votes	%	±%
Labour	Ken Jones	1,017	27.6	
Labour	Sue Jones	993	26.9	
Conservative	Christopher Hardman	664	18.0	
Conservative	Lee Gregson	560	15.2	
Liberal Democrats	Gareth Armstrong	299	8.1	
Liberal Democrats	Martin Cassell	155	4.2	

Hoole
Party	Candidate	Votes	%	±%
Conservative	David Suthers	887	27.3	
Conservative	John Rainsbury	765	23.5	
UKIP	Ann Holmes	394	12.1	
UKIP	Shirley Parkinson	349	10.7	
Labour	James Minall	346	10.6	
Labour	Terri Yates	334	10.3	
Liberal Democrats	Helen Crewe	105	3.2	
Liberal Democrats	Peter Hubberstey	73	2.2	

Buckshaw & Worden
Party	Candidate	Votes	%	±%
Conservative	Caroline Moon	1,444	29.2	
Conservative	Alan Ogilvie	1,312	26.6	
Labour	John Gillooly	963	19.5	
Labour	Ruth Wynn	853	17.3	
Liberal Democrats	Alexander Howarth	202	4.1	
Liberal Democrats	Doris Pimblett	334	3.3	

Howick & Priory
Party	Candidate	Votes	%	±%
Liberal Democrats	David Howarth	1,650	14.8	
Conservative	David Bird	1,585	14.2	
Conservative	Rebecca Noblet	1,547	13.8	
Liberal Democrats	Tony Pimblett	1479	13.2	
Conservative	Alistair Woollard	1372	12.3	
Labour	David Bennett	1173	10.5	
Liberal Democrats	Angela Turner	1130	10.1	
UKIP	John Carruthers	678	6.1	
Green	Henshaw Sandy	560	5.0	

Broad Oak
Party	Candidate	Votes	%	±%
Liberal Democrats	Harry Hancock	1,650	26.5	
Conservative	Linda Woollard	973	20.3	
Liberal Democrats	Tim Young	957	19.9	
Conservative	Frances Walker	901	18.8	
Labour	Robert Taylor	698	14.5	

Walton-le-Dale West
Party	Candidate	Votes	%	±%
Conservative	Michael Nathan	1,148	29.5	
Conservative	Michael Nelson	1,085	27.8	
Labour	Linda Parry	879	22.6	
Labour	Alex Watson	785	20.1	

Farington East
Party	Candidate	Votes	%	±%
Labour	Jonathon Woodcock	751	23.9	
Conservative	Paul Wharton	747	23.7	
Labour	Malcolm Donoghue	711	22.6	
Conservative	Alan Pearmain	609	19.4	
Liberal Democrats	Katherine Hesketh-Holt	206	6.5	
Liberal Democrats	Marion Hancock	122	3.9	

Middleforth
Party	Candidate	Votes	%	±%
Labour	Keith Martin	1,754	18.0	
Labour	Jim Patten	1,635	16.8	
Labour	David Wooldridge	1,573	16.1	
Conservative	Jenny Hothersall	1280	13.1	
Conservative	Joan Burrows	1239	12.7	
Conservative	Clarke Steele	1110	11.4	
UKIP	Neil Anyon	787	8.1	
Liberal Democrats	Maria McCann	364	3.7	

Walton-le-Dale East
Party	Candidate	Votes	%	±%
Conservative	Andrea Ball	1,123	28.7	
Conservative	Barbara Nathan	950	24.3	
Labour	Steve Bennett	937	23.9	
Labour	Phil Entwistle	906	23.1	

== See also ==
- South Ribble
